= Any Human Heart =

2002 novel by William Boyd, a British writer

- First edition cover
- Author: William Boyd
- Language: English
- Genre: Realism
- Publisher: Hamish Hamilton
- Publication date: 2002
- Publication place: United Kingdom
- Media type: Print novel
- Pages: 503 pp
- ISBN: 0-241-14177-X
- OCLC: 48753788
- Dewey Decimal: 823/.914 21
- LC Class: PR6052.O9192 A64 2002
- Preceded by: Nat Tate: An American Artist 1928–1960 (1998)
- Followed by: Restless (2006)

Any Human Heart: The Intimate Journals of Logan Mountstuart is a 2002 novel by William Boyd, a British writer. It is written as a lifelong series of journals kept by the fictional character Mountstuart, a writer whose life (1906–1991) spanned the defining episodes of the 20th century, crossed several continents and included a convoluted sequence of relationships and literary endeavours. Boyd uses the diary form to explore how public events impinge on individual consciousness, so that Mountstuart's journal alludes almost casually to the war, the death of a prime minister, or the abdication of the king. Boyd plays ironically on the theme of literary celebrity, introducing his protagonist to several real writers who are included as characters.

The journal style of the novel, with its gaps, false starts and contradictions, reinforces the theme of the changing self in the novel. Many plot points simply fade away. The novel received mixed reviews from critics on publication, but has sold well and has become one of the best known of Boyd's works. It is the second of Boyd's 'whole-life' novels which follow a protagonist through all, or at least most, of his or her life interspersing real and imagined events and people. Other such novels include The New Confessions (1987), Sweet Caress (2015) and The Romantic (2022).

A television adaptation was made with the screenplay written by Boyd, first broadcast in 2010.

== Composition ==
Mountstuart appeared in Boyd's short story "Hôtel des Voyageurs" written in the early 1990s and published in London Magazine and his 1995 collection The Destiny of Nathalie 'X'. The story was inspired by the journals written by writer and critic Cyril Connolly in the 1920s. It was written in journal form and was, like Connolly's journals self obsessed, lyrical and hedonistic. As a schoolboy, Boyd was obsessed with Connolly, avidly reading his reviews in The Sunday Times, and later read his entire published œuvre and found his flawed personality 'deeply beguiling'.

In 1998 Boyd had written the hoax biography of an invented artist, Nat Tate: An American Artist 1928-1960, in which Mountstuart reappeared. Boyd claimed that he, as a biographer, had first heard of the painter through the work of a little-known British writer, a black-and-white photograph of whom Boyd had found in a French second-hand shop. The caption identified the chubby man as "Logan Mountstuart in 1952". Boyd described him as,

a curious and forgotten figure in the annals of 20th-century literary life. 'A man of letters' is probably the only description which does justice to his strange career – by turns acclaimed or wholly indigent. Biographer, belletrist, editor, failed novelist, he was perhaps most successful at happening to be in the right place at the right time during most of the century, and his journal – a huge, copious document – will probably prove his lasting memorial.

Boyd distinguished journal, biography and memoir as literary forms, different treatments of the same essential subject, the human condition, the change in medium justified his writing again of a whole-life view: "I don't think there's anything wrong with going back over territory you've previously covered."

Though avowedly not an (auto-)biographical novelist, Boyd acknowledged that personal experiences often subconsciously affect a writer's fiction. As in several of Boyd's novels there are parallels with the author's life: both Boyd and Mountstuart lived in Africa and France, studied at Oxford, worked in literary London and had a taste of New York. Boyd usually splits the creation of a novel into two phases: research and writing. The first phase of Any Human Heart took 30 months as he carefully plotted Mountstuart's life to be significant but seem random, a period during which he bought several hundred books. He spent another year and a half writing the book.

== Synopsis ==
The book begins with a quotation from Henry James, "Never say you know the last word about any human heart." A short preface (an anonymous editor suggests it was written in 1987) explains that the earliest pages have been lost, and recounts briefly Mountstuart's childhood in Montevideo, Uruguay, before he moves to England aged seven with his English father and Uruguayan mother. In his final term at school he and two friends set challenges. Logan is to get on to the school's first XV rugby team; Peter Scabius has to seduce Tess, a local farmer's daughter; and Ben Leeping, a lapsed Jew, has to convert to Roman Catholicism. Mountstuart enters Oxford on an exhibition and leaves with a third in History. Settling in London, he enjoys early success as a writer with The Mind's Imaginings, a critically successful biography of Shelley; The Girl Factory, a salacious novel about prostitutes (which is poorly reviewed but sells well); and Les Cosmopolites, a respectable book on some obscure French poets. Mountstuart's mother loses the family wealth in the Wall Street crash. He embarks on a series of amorous encounters: he loses his virginity to Tess, is rejected by Land Fothergill whom he met at Oxford, and marries Lottie, an Earl's daughter. They live together at Thorpe Hall in Norfolk, where Mountstuart, unstimulated by slow country life and his warm but dull wife, becomes idle.

He meets Freya whilst on holiday, and begins an affair with her. Just before he departs for Barcelona to report on the Spanish Civil War, Lottie unexpectedly visits his London flat and quickly realises another woman lives with him. On his return to England, following an acrimonious divorce, he marries Freya in Chelsea Town Hall. The newlyweds move to a house in Battersea where Freya gives birth to their daughter, Stella. During the Second World War, Mountstuart is recruited into the Naval Intelligence Division by Ian Fleming. He is sent to Portugal to monitor the Duke and Duchess of Windsor; when they move to the Bahamas, Mountstuart follows, playing golf with the Duke and socialising regularly until the murder of Sir Harry Oakes. Mountstuart suspects the Duke is a conspirator after two hired detectives ask him to incriminate Oakes' son-in-law with false fingerprint evidence. Mountstuart refuses and is called a "Judas" by the Duchess. Later in the war, Mountstuart is interned in Switzerland for two years. After the war's end, he is grieved to discover that Freya, thinking him dead, had remarried and then died, along with Stella, in a V-2 attack.

Mountstuart's life collapses as he seeks refuge in an alcoholic daze to escape his depression. He buys 10b Turpentine Lane, a small basement flat in Pimlico. He returns to Paris to finish his existentialist novella, The Villa by the Lake, staying with his old friend Ben Leeping (now a successful gallery owner). After a failed sexual encounter with Odile, a young French girl working at Ben's gallery, he attempts suicide but is surprised by the girl when she returns an hour later for her Zippo lighter. Ben offers Mountstuart a job as manager of his new gallery in New York, "Leeping fils". Mountstuart mildly prospers in the art scene of the 1960s, meeting artists like Willem de Kooning (whom he admires) and Jackson Pollock (whom he does not); he moves in with an American lawyer, Alannah, and her two young daughters. On his return to London, he has an affair with Gloria, Peter Scabius' third wife (Peter has become a successful author of popular novels), and in New York with Janet, a gallery owner. He eventually discovers Alannah having her own affair, and the couple split. He reconciles with his son from his first marriage, Lionel, who has moved to New York to manage a pop group, until Lionel's sudden death. Monday, Lionel's girlfriend, moves into Mountstuart's flat; at first friends, they become intimates until her father turns up and Mountstuart discovers – to his horror – that she is 16 (having told him she was 19). His lawyer advises him to leave America to avoid prosecution for statutory rape.

In the African journal, Mountstuart has become an English lecturer at the University College of Ikiri in Nigeria, from where he reports on the Biafran War. He retires to London on a paltry pension and, now an old man, he is knocked over by a speeding post office van. In hospital he brusquely refuses to turn to religion, swearing his atheism and humanism to a priest. He recovers but is now completely destitute. To boost his income and publicise the state of hospitals, he joins the Socialist Patients' Kollective (SPK), which turns out to be a cell of the Baader-Meinhof Gang. He becomes the SPK's prize newspaper seller and is sent on a special mission to the continent. The trip ends with a brief interrogation by Special Branch, after which Mountstuart returns to his life of penury in London. With a new appreciation of life, he sells his flat and moves to a small village in the south of France, living in a house bequeathed to him by an old friend. He fits into the village well, introducing himself as an écrivain who is working on a novel called Octet. As he contemplates his past life after the deaths of Peter and Ben, his old school friends, he muses:

That's all your life amounts to in the end: the aggregate of all the good luck and the bad luck you experience. Everything is explained by that simple formula. Tot it up – look at the respective piles. There's nothing you can do about it: nobody shares it out, allocates it to this one or that, it just happens. We must quietly suffer the laws of man's condition, as Montaigne says.

== Themes ==
=== Multiple selves ===
Multiplicity of self is introduced early on as a theme, to capture a "more riotous and disorganised reality", and the use of the journal as the novel's literary form is explicitly pointed to as developing this theme: "We keep a journal to entrap the collection of selves that forms us, the individual human being" the narrator explains. In an article in The Guardian, Boyd confirmed "this thesis that we are an anthology, a composite of many selves" is a theme of the book. While man's fundamental nature remains the same, he moves in and out of happiness, love and good health. Wisdom, as with age, is slowly acquired.

=== 20th century ===
Boyd has previously written about the 20th century through two characters: The New Confessions was a fictional memoir, and Nat Tate a spoof biography. In Any Human Heart, Boyd uses the journal form as a fresh angle from which to pursue the subject: "I wanted to invent my own exemplary figure who could seem almost as real as the real ones and whose life followed a similar pattern: boarding school, university, Paris in the 20s, the rise of Fascism, war, post-war neglect, disillusion, increasing decrepitude, and so on—a long, varied and rackety life that covered most of the century." Boyd sets Mountstuart's life within its context, tracing the grand arc of events during the 20th century by depicting Mountstuart as swept along in the flow of history – he serves in World War II, sees the cultural revolution in the 1950s and 60s, and takes advantage of modern transport in his extensive travels around the world. Rather than being re-told in hindsight, their importance in context, historical events are seen through the petty lens of every-day living. For example, in an entry from the 1920s, Mountstuart notes "Coffee with Land Fothergill at the Cadena. She was wearing a velvet coat that matched her eyes. We talked a little stiffly about Mussolini and Italy and I was embarrassed to note how much better informed she was than I."

Boyd said he was partially inspired by the generation of English writers who matured between the wars: "I am fascinated by the life and work of that generation of English writers who were born at the beginning of the century and reached maturity by the time of World War II. People like Evelyn Waugh and Graham Greene and Anthony Powell, obviously, but also less well known writers—Henry Green, Lawrence Durrell, Cyril Connolly and William Gerhardie. The last two in particular lurk closely behind Logan." Both real and imagined characters are blended into this context, where historical personages are typically used to concentrate the historical significance of a novel's plot, Mountstuart's encounters with them are superficial, leaving only an impression of both parties' small-mindedness. John Mullan found the conceit most effective during the New York journal, where Boyd satirises figures in the Abstract Expressionist movement during the 1950s "whose characters seem almost beyond invention."

== Genre and style ==
The novel is narrated in the first person through a series of nine journaux intimes, kept by Mountstuart from age 17 until shortly before his death at 85. French literary journals, always published posthumously, are often extremely candid accounts, particularly of the author's sexual life. Boyd, himself a francophile, includes masturbation, prostitution and Mountstuart's three marriages. While Boyd had earlier written work in the form of memoir or biography, a journal is different: "For a start, it's written without the benefit of hindsight, so there isn't the same feeling you get when you look back and add shape to a life. There are huge chunks missing." The novel's grounding in everyday life and focus on characterisation place it firmly within realism.

Each journal covers a different period of Mountstuart's life, and they are usually geographically named: The School Journal, London I, etc. Boyd varied the narrator's tone in each to demonstrate changes in Mountstuart's character. In the first London Journal he is, according to Boyd, a "modernist aesthete", becoming a "world-weary cynic" in New York and finding "serene and elegiac serenity" in the final French journal. To support the book's historical themes and documentary premise, there is a feigned editorial apparatus: an index listing real people and their relation to Mountstuart alongside fictional characters, an editor's introduction (by Boyd), an authorial preface (by Mountstuart) and a list of works attributed to Mountstuart. An additional stylistic feature is the anonymous editor (Boyd), who introduces the book and offers explanatory footnotes, cross-references and attempts at dating. Since a journal is written from the perspective of each day, Mountstuart's moods change as events affect him. The form lends itself to "plotlessness", since the author/narrator inevitably cannot see the overall structure of the story. Plot lines which "fizzle and fade" emphasise the theme of multiple selves throughout life. Boyd adds other aspects to the work, such as parenthetical musings that are never answered, to re-enforce the style. His tone of voice gradually changes as he ages: Boyd wanted the style to reflect the major theme that we change and grow throughout life: "I wanted the literary tone of each journal to reflect this and so the voice subtly changes as you read on: from pretentious school boy to modern young decadent, to bitter realist to drink soaked cynic, to sage and serene octogenarian, and so forth."

== Critical reception ==
Richard Eder praised Any Human Heart in the New York Times: "William Boyd, is multifaceted and inventive, and he plays a deep game under his agile card tricks." Christopher Tayler, in the London Review of Books, called the characterisation of Mountstuart weak and wondered if he was merely a device through which Boyd could write pastiche about 20th-century writers, "Boyd hustles you through to the end despite all this, but it's hard not to wonder if it was really worth making the journey." In The Atlantic Monthly, Brooke Allen liked the Mountstuart character: "he is far more generous, forgiving, and free than most of us. He is also more amusing, and more amused by life", thus making an "attractive central character" and Boyd's writing showed "a great natural vitality and an increasingly sophisticated humanism." The Atlantic Monthly selected it as one of the "books of the year".

In The Observer, Tim Adams complimented the opening sections as "nicely layered with the pretensions of a particular precocious kind of student" but criticised the "predictability" of Mountstuart's "walk-on part in literary history" and ultimately the suspension of disbelief, particularly the Baader-Meinhoff passages, concluding "For all the incident, for all the change he witnesses, Mountstuart never really feels like a credible witness either to history or emotion." Tom Cox in The Daily Telegraph disagreed: he praised the characterisation, calling Mountstuart "a man whose fragile egotism and loose-fitting story has you frequently forgetting you're reading fiction, and even more frequently forgetting you're reading at all." Giles Foden, in The Guardian, found the New York art-scene sections weakest, saying they "puncture the realism Boyd has so carefully built up in the rest of the novel." Michiko Kakutani agreed that Mountstuart's youth was well evoked, but that the description of his retirement and poverty was "as carefully observed and emotionally resonant". While in the early part of the book "the characters' marionette strings [are] carefully hidden", later Boyd tried to play God, resulting in "an increasingly contrived narrative that begins to strain our credulity."

Boyd spends his summers in the south of France and has a large readership in France. Several French newspapers favourably reviewed Any Human Heart, published in France in 2002 as "A livre ouvert: Les carnets intimes de Logan Mountstuart.L'express called Boyd a "magician", while Le Nouvel Observateur called it "very good Boyd. Perhaps even his magnum opus." In France the book won the 2003 Prix Jean Monnet de Littérature Européenne which rewards European authors for work written or translated into French.

The novel was on the longlist for the Booker Prize in 2002, and on the shortlist for the International Dublin Literary Award in 2004. In 2009, Boyd commented, "[it] didn't get particularly good reviews, yet I've never had so many letters about a novel. It's selling fantastically well seven years on, and we're about to turn it into six hours of telly for Channel 4, so something about that novel gets to readers."

== Television adaptation ==
On 15 April 2010, Channel 4 announced the making of a four-part television serial based on the novel. Boyd wrote the screenplay, with (successively) Sam Claflin, Matthew Macfadyen and Jim Broadbent playing Mountstuart as he ages. It was broadcast from 21 November to 12 December 2010. The drama was broadcast in re-edited form as three one-and-a-half-hour episodes on 13, 20 and 27 February 2011 in the United States on PBS as part of the Masterpiece Classic program. For international distribution to other streaming channels the originally conceived six part version was produced.
