= The New Confessions =

Book by William Boyd

- First edition
- Author: William Boyd
- Language: English
- Publisher: Hamish Hamilton
- Publication date: 28 Sep 1987
- Publication place: United Kingdom
- Pages: 384
- ISBN: 0-241-12383-6
- Preceded by: Stars and Bars (1985)
- Followed by: Brazzaville Beach (1990)

The New Confessions is the fourth novel by the Scottish writer William Boyd published in 1987. The theme and narrative structure of the novel is modelled on Jean-Jacques Rousseau's Les Confessions, the reading of which has a huge impact on the protagonist's life. The book is the first of Boyd's 'whole-life' novels which follow a protagonist through all, or at least most, of his or her life interspersing real and imagined events and people. Later such novels include Any Human Heart (2002), Sweet Caress (2015) and The Romantic (2022).

== Plot ==
The book follows the life of John James Todd from his birth in Edinburgh up to his final exile on a Mediterranean island. Todd fights in the First World War and also films it as a cameraman, he then works for a film studio and ends up in Berlin where he starts his filming of The Confessions. After the financial collapse of his backer, he moves to Hollywood along with many German exiles. He becomes a war correspondent during the Second World War and then returns to America where he becomes caught up in the anti-communist witch hunts.

== Reception ==
- Kirkus Reviews praises the novel: "A superbly entertaining, riveting work of major rank...Full of wild swings and ironic inversions, Boyd's latest nonetheless holds together by the intensity and sheer drive of his modern-day Rousseau. Rich, thoroughly absorbing work."
- Ronald Gottesman writing in the Los Angeles Times concludes that "Boyd has created an important and complex character in a vividly evoked series of settings. He has told a tale that we cannot not believe in (in spite of its many astonishing turns). He has written a subtle and provocative history of our time. Boyd is no longer a young writer of promise; with this book, he takes his place as a major novelist."
- Michiko Kakutani from The New York Times is also positive: "While using Rousseau's life and work as a framework for his story, Mr. Boyd never makes the mistake of trying to turn Todd into a heavyweight philosopher, never belabors his role as a representative man. As a result, he has produced an entertaining and darkly comic novel, a novel given weight and ballast by the pressure of recent history."
- Joseph O'Neill of the Literary Review writes that "To reveal any of the story would be a shame, because the great pleasure of this book is provided by its thrilling momentum and unexpected twists. Suffice to say that J J Todd experiences everything - Berlin in the Twenties, World War Two and, perhaps best of all the McCarthy witch-hunts. As Todd puts it, I have hunkered down in the mulch of the phenomenal world.' This is just about the only conclusion he comes up with. As Rousseau put it describing himself, he is a man who feels everything but sees nothing.
- Martha Duffy from Time has some reservations: "some of the gusto is missing. As his hero ages, the author's energy flags. Promising situations are brought up only to be dropped, and the tour of the century ends rather limply. Still, Boyd, a skilled and productive novelist (A Good Man in Africa, Stars and Bars), has succeeded in no small feat: writing a portrait of an artist that is both entertaining and intellectually engaging."
