= Sweet Caress =

2015 novel by William Boyd

- First edition
- Author: William Boyd
- Publisher: Bloomsbury Publishing
- Publication date: 2015 (hardback); 2016 (paperback)
- Pages: 464
- ISBN: 9781408867990
- OCLC: 53163201
- Preceded by: Solo (2013)
- Followed by: Love Is Blind (2018)

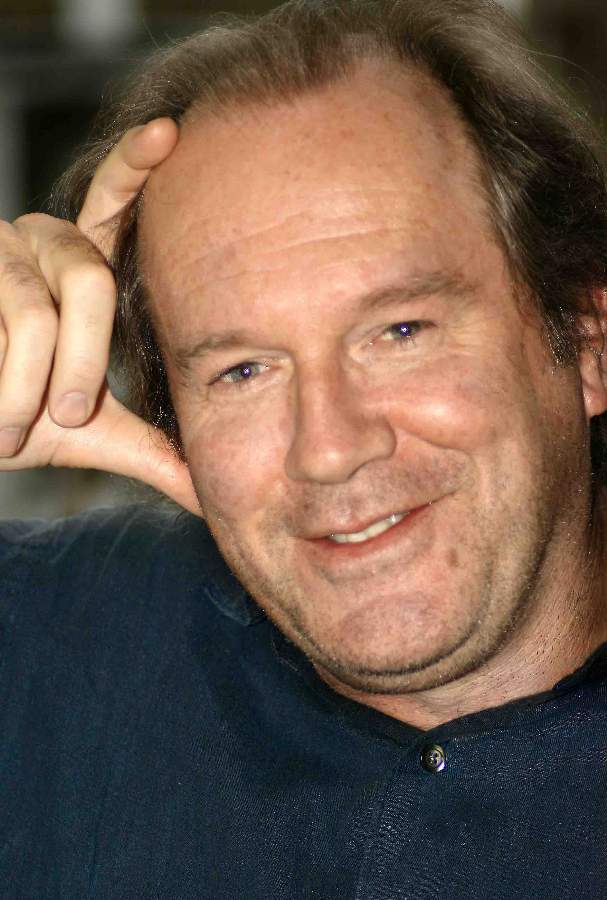
Boyd in 2009

Sweet Caress: The Many Lives of Amory Clay is a novel by William Boyd, published by Bloomsbury in 2015. A fictional autobiography supposedly written by a woman, Amory Clay, born in 1908, it includes extracts from her diary, written on a Hebridean island in 1977, with flashbacks from her career as a photographer in London, Scotland, France, Germany, the United States, Mexico and Vietnam. The book also includes more than 70 photographs, collected by Boyd, most of which are attributed to her.

Boyd describes it as a "whole life novel" in that it tells the story of the book's main character "from cradle to grave", a technique he also employed in The New Confessions (1987), Any Human Heart (2002) and later The Romantic (2024).

The book is dedicated to Boyd's wife, Susan.

== Plot ==
Amory Clay lives alone in a cottage on a Scottish island where, in 1977, she is writing a journal about her life and career. Born in 1908, she is the eldest of three children in a middle-class family in East Sussex. She excels academically at boarding school and was encouraged by her teacher to go to Somerville College, Oxford, but performs badly in her exams after her father, traumatised by his military experiences in the First World War, tries to commit suicide and to kill her as well.

Apprenticed to her uncle, Clay works as a society photographer in London but then seeks more excitement in Berlin, where she frequents the underworld and takes photographs that, when she exhibits them in Soho in London, are viewed as scandalous. An American magazine Global-Photo-Watch, offers her a job and she moves to Greenwich Village on Washington Square Park in New York in 1932, where she has affairs with her American boss and with a French diplomat who is also a writer. Back in London, where she runs an office for the American magazine, she covers a 1935 demonstration by Oswald Mosley’s fascists in Stepney, in which she is attacked and badly injured.

After spending the early part of the Second World War as a fashion photographer in New York, she returns to Europe as a war photographer and accompanies Allied Forces as they sweep through France and Germany. She meets and marries a British officer, Sholto Farr in 1946, who is also a Scottish lord, and – unexpectedly, as she had thought the injuries she had received from Mosley's supporters had made her infertile – gives birth to twin daughters.

Like her own father, her husband is haunted by memories of war. He drinks heavily, gambles, and loses much of the family fortune, before dying of a heart attack.

Living in reduced circumstances, Amory returns to photography, seeks excitement as a Vietnam War photographer, then travels to California to search for one of her daughters, who has joined a hippy colony and religious sect, and with whom she is eventually reconciled. Looking back on her life and career, and in increasingly poor health, the 69-year-old Amory contemplates taking her own life.

== Publishing history and adaptations ==
Sweet Caress was published by Bloomsbury in the United Kingdom and the United States in hardback in 2015 and in paperback in 2016. It was published in Canada by HarperCollins in 2015.

A French language edition, Les vies multiples d’Amory Clay, translated by Isabelle Perrin, was published by Éditions du Seuil in October 2015. A German language version, Die Fotografin: Die vielen Leben der Amory Clay, was published in Berlin in 2016 by Belletristik, in a translation by Patricia Klobusiczky and Ulrike Thiesmeyer.

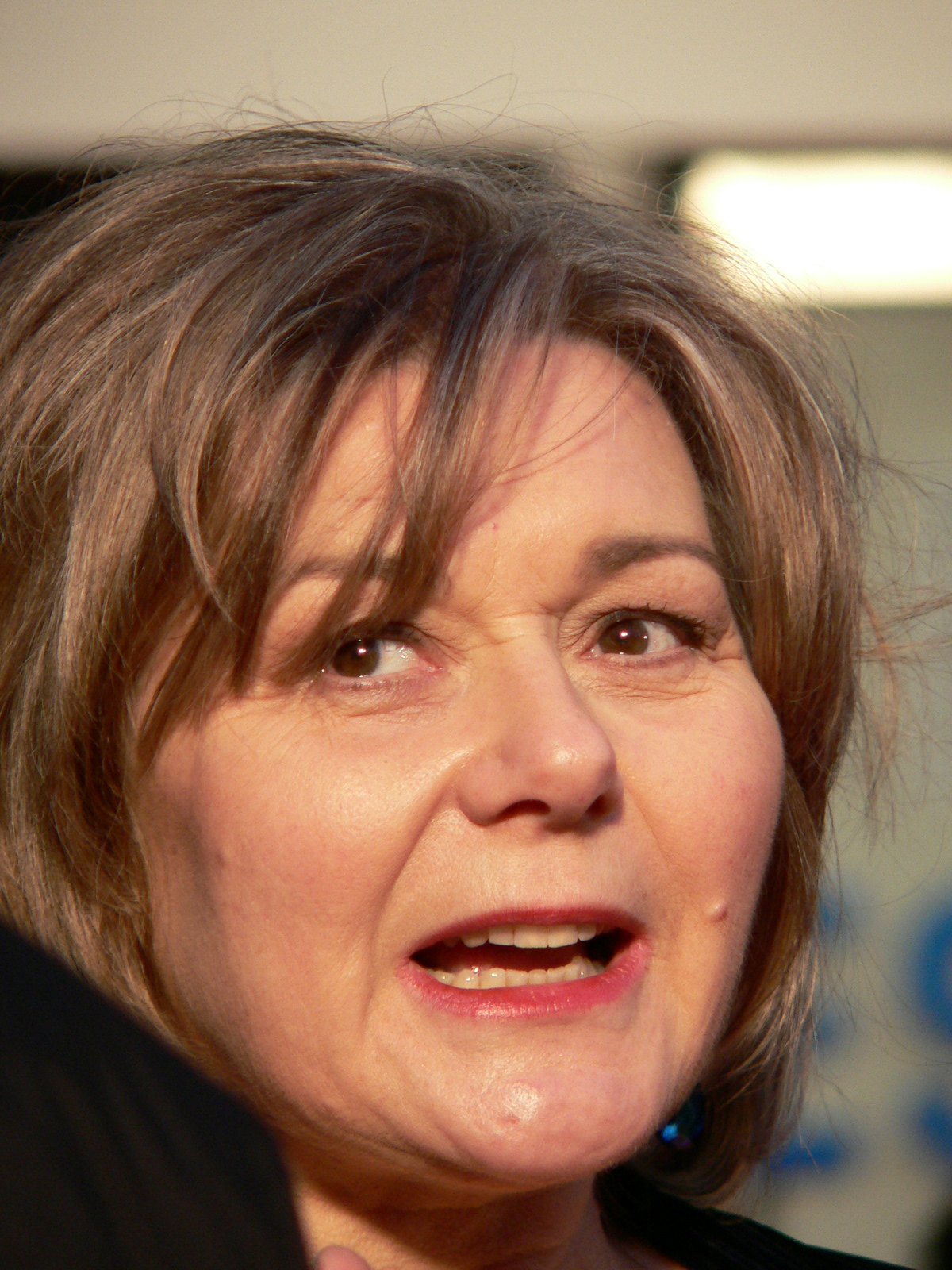
Barbara Flynn

An unabridged audiobook version, narrated by Jilly Bond and lasting 15 hours and 9 minutes, was released in the United Kingdom by Whole Story AudioBooks in September 2015 and in Australia by W F Howes in October 2015. An unabridged audiobook version, narrated by Susan Lyons and lasting 15 hours and 44 minutes, was released in the United States by Recorded Books in September 2015.

Abridged by Sara Davies and read by Barbara Flynn, Sweet Caress was serialised on BBC Radio 4's Book at Bedtime in 2015.

== Reception ==
Reviewing the book in The Observer, Elizabeth Day said that it "blends history and fiction to fine effect... Amory’s fictional voice never wavers. She can be tricky, contradictory and impulsive, but this only serves to emphasise her realness. She emerges from this novel as a rounded, complex, infernally beguiling human being... [Boyd] delights in blending artifice with naturalism – the text is punctuated by photos supposedly taken by Amory and by the occasional portrait, sufficiently blurred to remain just anonymous enough. Even the title of the book is taken from an invented quote lifted from a hypothetical novel written by one of the fictional characters. But the cleverness never overwhelms the narrative. Sweet Caress is an audacious, sweeping, rich layer cake of a novel, at once a textual hall of mirrors and a brilliant tale of a life well lived".

"For William Boyd's war-photographer heroine, life is a series of accidents", according to Caroline Moore in her review of Sweet Caress for The Spectator. "Boyd’s representation of a certain sort of female voice is pitch-perfect" she said and "[f]or those who appreciate a novel in which emotional life is sensed at the edges of what is said, this is a masterly portrait. And the final chapters, in which Amory tries, with typical courage, to take ultimate control of her life, and then finds further courage to recognise the limitations of control, are superbly written and desperately moving".

Justin Cartwright, also for The Observer, said that "Sweet Caress is a compendious and intelligent work, made authentic by Boyd’s extensive use of real dispatches and evocative photographs and his familiarity with makes of camera".

Mary Hoffman, reviewing the book for The Independent, described it as "an utterly compelling read and Boyd's best novel since Restless". She concluded: "The effect of Amory is that of an interesting woman with a life well-lived, who is not content to sit back and be beautiful as an adored wife or mistress. She grasps every opportunity with both hands, wherever it leads her. Not a bad epitaph, and a tribute to Boyd's skill that we miss her like a friend when we, and she, reach the end".

Trish Halpin, editor-in-chief of Marie Claire, described Boyd's novel as "[r]iveting – I’m sure this will be my book of the year".

Geir Darge, for The Student, called Sweet Caress "bold and enthralling, humorous and heart-breaking". He said: "The reader cannot help but live alongside Amory from the tragedies of her younger years to the pensive isolation of her later life. His latest novel is yet more proof that Boyd has a gift for creating a perfect novel".

Madeleine Keane, reviewing the book in the Irish Independent, said: "One of the great strengths of Sweet Caress is Amory – a complex character who, though not always likeable, is frequently admirable, not least in her desire to lead an interesting life". She recalled that "Boyd once said how he tried 'to make fiction seem so real you forget it's fiction'" and said that, in her view, "He mostly succeeds". She concluded: "Amory's gay uncle Greville invents a game (the early sections are pure Mitford), in which people are described in four adjectives. Sweet Caress is, like most of this writer's impressive body of work, vivid, poignant, compulsive and entertaining".

Jon Michaud, writing in The Washington Post, was more critical, saying that "for all its surface drama and intrigue, 'Sweet Caress' remains a resolutely bland book, and Amory Clay’s life story never amounts to more than a string of diverting anecdotes, like a series of stories polished over countless retellings at parties. Boyd’s decision to go for panoramic sweep rather than detailed close-up often results in an unsatisfying cursoriness... A running gag between Amory and her uncle is that everyone can be summed up in four adjectives. Applying that notion to 'Sweet Caress,' I’d say, breezy, overlong, superficial and disappointing".

== Controversy ==
In the chapter on Amory Clay's experiences as a war photographer in the Vietnam War, she meets British soldiers who are operating undercover as Australians. Boyd said in 2017 that although he believed that the Ministry of Defence still denied it, he thought that "it is pretty much established now that British forces were fighting in Vietnam, disguised in the late 60s early 70s".
