= Cadena Cafes Limited =

UK coffeehouse chain

Cadena locations in 1934 prospectus

Cadena Cafés Limited was a chain of coffeehouses in South West England. It was established in 1895 under the name Lloyd's Oriental Café, subsequently Lloyd's Cadena Cafés Ltd. It became Cadena Cafés Ltd in 1907 and went on to operate over twenty branches. It took over Paignton-based Dellers Cafés in 1933. It was eventually taken over by Tesco in January 1965 and the cafés closed during the 1970s. It was listed on the Bristol Stock Exchange; from 1927 to at least 1950, its AGMs were fully reported by the Western Daily Press.

== Expansion ==
In 1902, Lloyds Oriental Café had branches in Bristol, Oxford, Hastings, Southsea, Tunbridge Wells and Richmond which served a coffee blend they called "Cadena". In 1919, the company – by then itself known as Cadena – purchased the Cheltenham cafés Cosy Corner and the Oriental Café from Ernest Edward Marfell who became a director of the Cadena company. They considerably expanded Cosy Corner. In 1924, Cadena expanded their Wine Street, Bristol branch to include a "grill room" for gentlemen only.

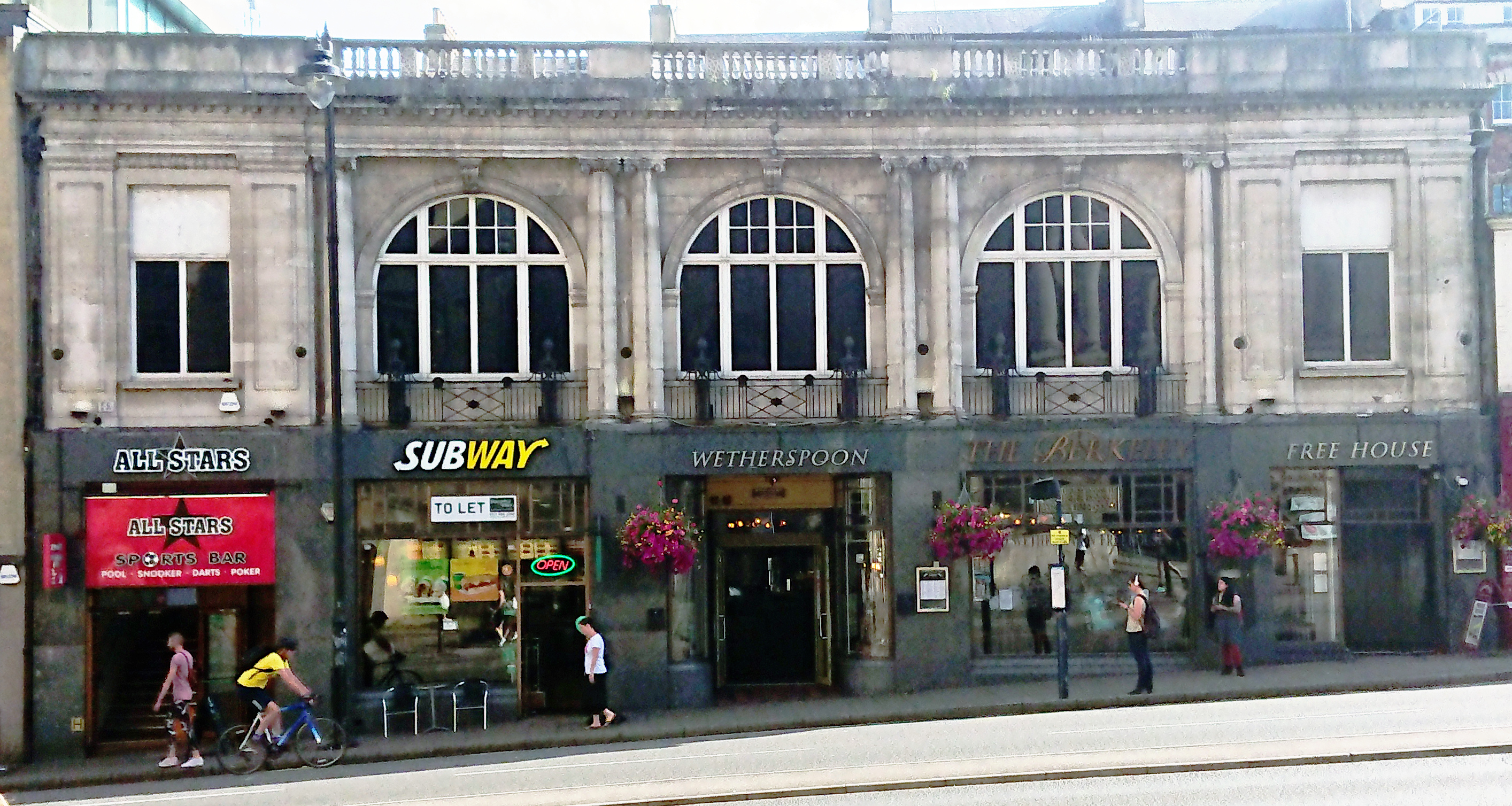
The former Cadena Berkeley Café in Bristol near the University

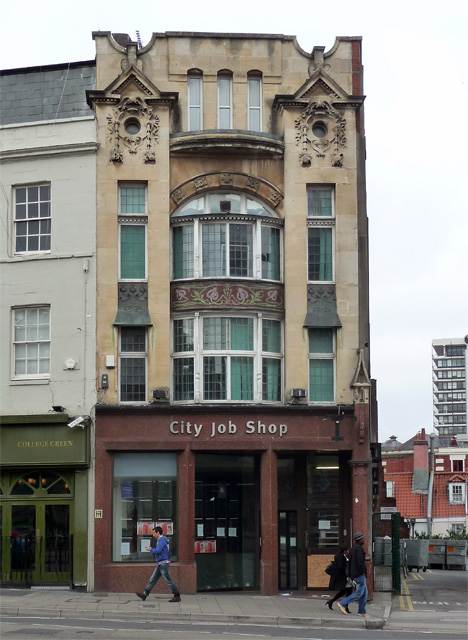
38 College Green, Bristol, opened November 1904 by Lloyds Oriental Café Ltd. City Job Shop in 2012. Fish and Chip shop in 2018.

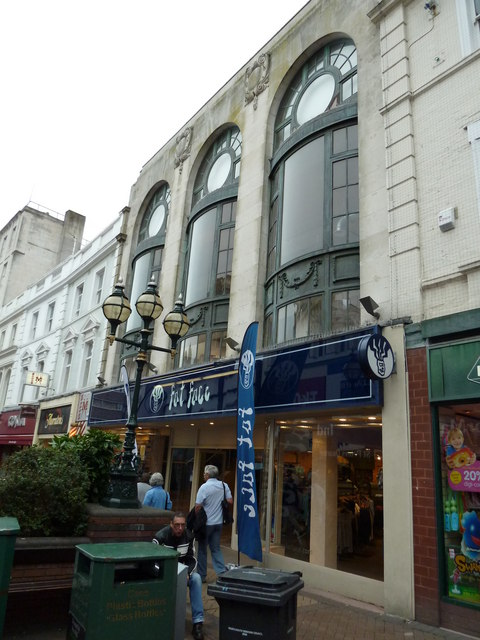
71-73 Old Christchurch Road, Bournemouth. Built 1922 for Cadena Cafes. Dillons Bookstore in 1995. Fatface in 2010

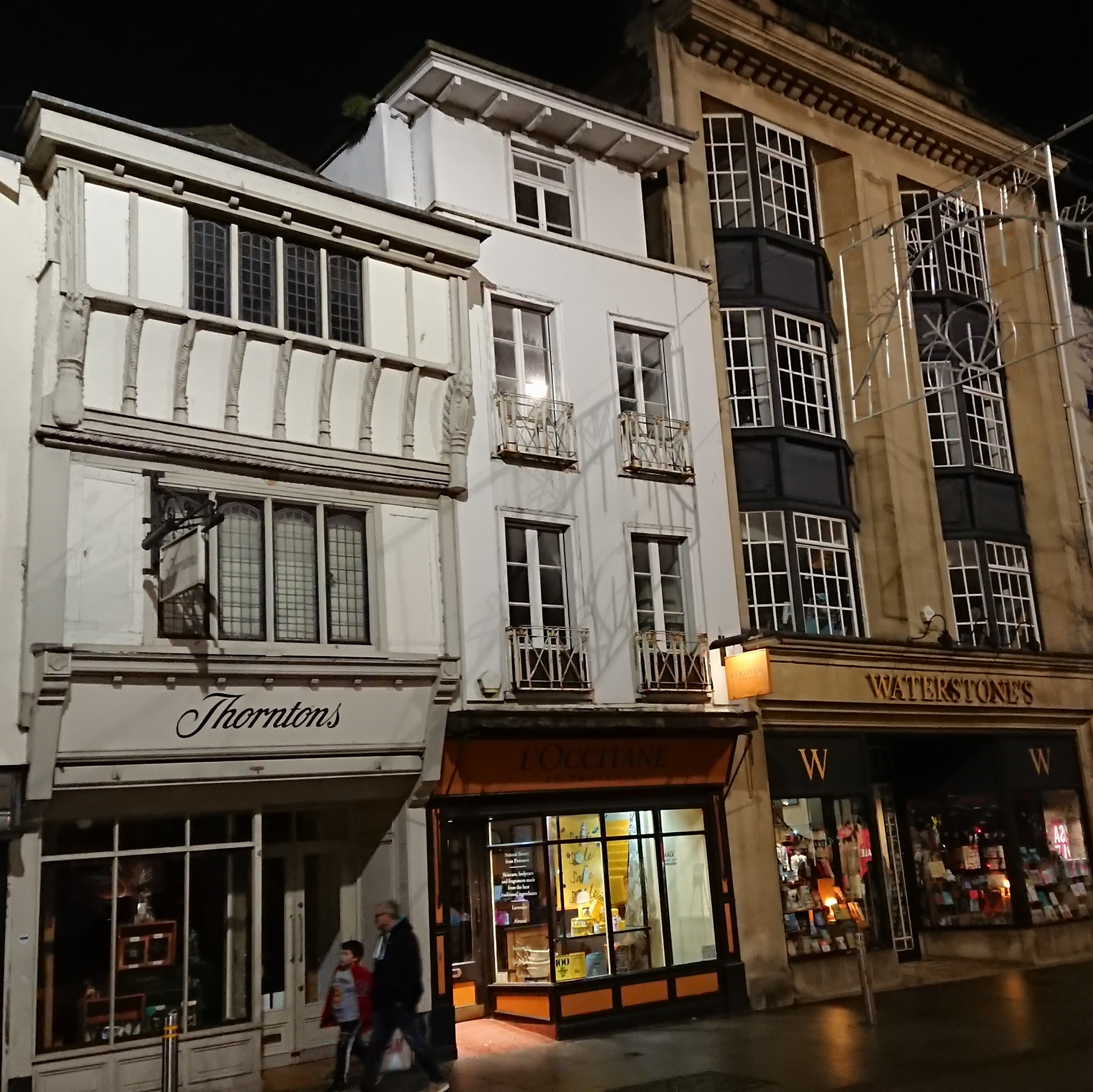
46-49 High Street, Exeter. Formerly Deller's Cafe, taken over by Cadena by 1933. 1922 datestone at roof level of 48-49 (Waterstones).

The growth of the company from 1927 can be tracked through the Western Daily Press AGM reports though sometimes similar announcements are made two years running. At their 34th AGM in 1927 they began a long tradition of holding their AGM at the then-new Berkeley Café in Bristol (which is now a Wetherspoons). They replaced their Bournemouth branch with a new one in Christchurch Road and bought a new site in Broad Street, Reading. In 1928 they opened in Oxford, started working in Salisbury and opened a new bakery in Bristol. Reading and Salisbury opened in 1929. Apart from the major acquisition of the Dellers company in 1933, the 1930s saw less expansion with the purchase of a Winchester site in 1930 which eventually opened in 1934.

In 1932 and 1934 the company sold more shares and mortgaged some property. The prospectuses give details of company activities and contractual commitments at the time. They therefore provide details of the cafés as they were in the early 1930s.

Premises listed in 1932 and 1934 prospectuses
Name	Street	Town	Comments
Cadena	15-17 Wine Street	Bristol	Prospectus says purchased 1931. There was a significant investment in the branch in 1933 when it competed with Cawardine's in nearby Corn Street. Cadena bought no.18 from Montague Burton by 1934. (There was a Lloyds Oriental Café in Wine Street in 1895.)
The Cabot	38 College Green	Bristol	Opened November 1904 by Lloyds Oriental Café Ltd as part of a redevelopment in the area. Contained The Rowley Inlaid Wood Panels by William Arthur Chase which formed a mural illustrating the life of John Cabot, and upstairs The Camelot Room contained six panels illustrating the life of King Arthur. As of April 2015 it is a Fish and Chip shop.
The Berkeley	15-19 Queens Road	Clifton	Venue for AGMs. Legal Charge created 28 September 1933.
Café at the Art Gallery	Queen's Road	Clifton	
Cadena	71-73 Old Christchurch Rd	Bournemouth	Photo and very brief history on Flickr when it was a Dillons bookseller. Kellys Directory for 1911 lists it as "Cadena Cafes Limited, 1 & 3 & 35 Old Christchurch road"
Botherways Café	4-6 Eastgate St	Gloucester	Acquired by January 1928
Café at the Red and White Bus Station	India Road	Gloucester	Added by 1934
Cadena	43-47 Cornmarket Street	Oxford	Bought and demolished in 1970 by Gordon Thoday Ltd. who had bought it from Tesco
Cadena	58-59 George Street	Richmond, Surrey	
The Tudor	34-36 Mount Pleasant	Tunbridge Wells	Opened July 1905 by Lloyds Oriental Café. Re-opened under Cadena ownership 1924 Mortgaged 8 August 1921.
Cadena	26-28 The Pantiles	Tunbridge Wells	Opened March 1902 with oriental theme Now known as Cadena House with flats upstairs, the ground floor is occupied by Shragers Patisserie
Cadena	The Arcade, High Street	Bedford	
The Corner House	108-110 Promenade	Cheltenham	Lloyd George Survey of Land Values seems to give 26 Promenade Villas for the Cosy Corner and dates the Marfell sale to 1921.
Cadena	395 High Street	Cheltenham	Gloucestershire Echo says this was formerly the Cosy Corner
Cadena	134-136 The Parade	Leamington Spa	
Cadena	33 Above Bar	Southampton	
Cadena	13 Duke Street	Cardiff	
Cadena	Market Square (40 Blue Boar Row)	Salisbury	There is a photo in the Francis Frith Collection and an entry from 1928 in the Salisbury City Council archives concerning "Alterations to Café"
Cadena	100-101 Broad Street	Reading	Formerly the Grand Cinema. Legal Charge created 28 September 1933.
Karina	31 High Street	Winchester	
Maynard's Café	The Square	Yeovil	Also known as "The Borough Restaurant"; purchased from Maynard in 1931.
The Central Restaurant	The Cross	Worcester	Purchased from Patten and Wells. Now Grade II Listed
No. 12	St Swithun's Street	Worcester	Purchased from Patten and Wells
Dellers Café	Bedford Street	Exeter	Dellers purchased in February 1933 Damaged in bombing 4 May 1942 and subsequently demolished.
Dellers Café	45-49 High Street	Exeter	Legal Charge created 28 September 1933.
Dellers Café	Torbay Road	Paignton	There is a photo in the Francis Frith Collection.
Dellers Café, "Summer Café"	Esplanade Road	Paignton	There is a photo in the Francis Frith Collection.
Dellers Café	The Bridge	Taunton	There is a photo online.

After this, development of a Worcester café was started in 1936 and opened in 1937 but 1939 saw the closure of the Leamington bakery and the Pantiles café in Tunbridge Wells. The 1940s saw a return to financial health despite wartime taxation. In 1942 they bought land at Brislington for a new bakery planned to be built after the war, and when that eventually opened in 1949 (albeit across the road in an existing building, not new build), they opened a new café at the former bakery site it replaced and launched a new "Cadenita" brand upstairs in the Ritz Cinema, Bristol. (The cinema opened in 1938 but closed thirty years later.)

== Documents at Companies House ==
The Cadena Cafés Limited documents at Companies House are filed under the name Tesco International Internet Retailing Limited following a change of name registered on 5 October 2011. Other documents filed there include:

- Incorporation of Lloyds Oriental Café, 1 January 1900.
- Certificate of Change of Name from Lloyds Oriental Café Limited to Lloyds Cadena Cafés Limited, 12 October 1905.
- Certificate of Change of Name from Lloyds Cadena Cafés Limited to Cadena Cafés Limited, 6 January 1908.

There are also documents relating to legal charges and mortgages:

- Mortgage created 8 August 1921 – Freehold of no.34 (Formerly no.19) Mount Pleasant Tunbridge Wells, Kent.
- Legal Charge created 28 September 1933 – Freehold & leasehold properties known as

1) The Berkeley Café, Clifton, Bristol, (being nos. 15, 17, & 19 Queens Road, nos. 25 to 30 Berkley Square, Bristol).
2) Dellor's Main Café, High Street, Exeter (being situated at 23 & 24 High Street, Catherine Street and Bedford Street Exeter and partly over the building of Lloyds Bank Ltd.)
3) Cadena Café, Reading (being nos. 100 and 101 Broad Street Reading). Together with fixed plant, and machinery fixtures.

- Mortgage created 21 November 1934 – numerous properties

== Facilities ==
The cafés contained a range of different dining rooms for different purposes. For example, the Cadena at the Pantiles, Tunbridge Wells, opened in 1902 with a gentlemen's smoking room and a ladies' tea room. There were plans in Cheltenham in 1919 to add an upstairs "dining salon" and a roof garden and by 1924 Wine Street had a "Grill Room" with a "quick lunch counter". The Berkeley Café was already large enough to hold the AGM in 1927 but was having an additional 250-seat room constructed. In 1931, Botherway's was advertising a ground floor café and "the Connaught suite of rooms" on the first floor. There are frequent mentions in the AGM reports of premises being extended.

The cafés were also music and dance venues. The Cadena at 40 White Rock, Hastings, began "musical afternoon teas" in 1903. The Cosy Corner had a music licence in 1919. In the 1930s, Winchester's Cadena "also served as a ballroom at weekends ... with special dances over the Christmas period." In 1944, Eastgate (Gloucester) was being used as a venue for ballet lessons and public dances.

== Wartime ==
The outbreak of World War I led to mass enlistment and consequently labour shortages. Cadena was taken to court in 1914 for employing a fourteen-year-old in the Bristol bakery for longer than the permitted hours for an underage child. The company apologised but said it had been forced into that position because six of their staff had enlisted.

World War II features far more significantly in the press stories and annual general meeting reports. There was much discussion of wartime taxation. Cafés were destroyed in the Southampton Blitz, the Exeter Blitz and the Bristol Blitz and Cadena struggled to get permission to open temporary branches on the bomb sites. Later, in the Southampton and Exeter redevelopments, the local councils compulsorily purchased the land occupied by the shops and leased it back to Cadena, which meant they were now having to pay a lease on land they formerly owned. (This echos retailers' objections to the redevelopment of Plymouth.) In Bristol, they fought the postwar creation of the Broadmead Shopping Centre because it would take business away from the existing shopping centre where the café was located.

== Labour relations ==
The 1914 court case was for requiring a 14-year-old to work excessive hours in the bakery. In 1939, part of the reason for extending the Southampton branch was to comply with the Factory Act, implying that their staff facilities were not state-of-the-art at the time. However in the 1930s they set up a fund to reward loyal staff but also to provide financial support to staff who were struggling financially. At one AGM it was remarked that the directors were all actively employed at Cadena branches or bakeries, and it is noticeable that between 1916 and at least 1950 they only had four different Chairmen:

- John Wheeler Williams resigned in 1932 after 16 years service and received fulsome praise at his final AGM.
- James Edward Grace 1932 - 1937
- E.T. Thornton 1937 - 1946. It was announced at the January 1947 AGM that he had died
- Edward A. Harris 1947 - ?

There was an annual tradition of the directors hosting staff social events at different branches in the new year. Amongst numerous examples, in January 1925 staff in Bristol enjoyed a whist drive and musical performances. A subsidised savings scheme was announced in 1929. A "Staff Assistance Reserve" fund was established in the 1930s depression and, announced at the 1947 AGM, it was extended to provide pensions.

== Tesco takeover ==
Tesco's bid for Cadena Cafés Limited was announced in the press on 14 January 1965. and by 9 February 1965 it was well underway. In March, The Times reported that "offers to acquire the preference and ordinary shares of Cadena Cafés not already owned by Tesco have been received in respect of over 90 per cent of each class". It was intended to introduce Cadena cafés into Tesco supermarkets and to start selling Cadena pastries and cakes. Sarah Ryle estimates that there were forty-nine Cadena cafés and bakeries at the time of the takeover. By 1967, Tesco had plans to expand Cadena's bakery operation but this did not materialise and the former Cadena Cafés Limited subsidiary company was eventually renamed as Tesco International Internet Retailing Limited in 2011.

In 2007, the BBC reported the death of former Cadena director and shareholder John George White who had retired from Cadena in 1961 and made his fortune from the Tesco shares he received when the company was later sold.

== Legacy ==
The Tunbridge Wells premises are now called Cadena House. Cadena cafés are frequently mentioned in passing on nostalgia websites. Slightly longer articles recall the cafés in more detail, for example Southampton, Tunbridge Wells, Oxford, and Reading. The Southampton article recalls the menu, their wartime experience, and murals of local shipping scenes including the RMS Queen Elizabeth sailing from the Ocean Terminal. It is interesting that the murals are mentioned, given the prestigious murals at the Cabot in Bristol. The Tunbridge Wells article recalls the protocol, the menu and the skills of the waitresses, and points out that the last manager's grandchildren are still in the trade. As with Southampton, the artwork is mentioned, this time having the decor designed by Roger Fry. The Oxford article describes the business and calls for readers to contribute their own stories about the Cadena. The Reading article is actually a letter from a reader about the cinema building the Cadena occupied but it digresses to mention that the "freshly roasted coffee beans’ aroma wafted across Broad Street" and explain the sloping floor. The Berkeley in Queens Road, Bristol is now a J D Wetherspoons Pub. Deller's Café in Taunton eventually became a nightclub and was called Dellers Wharf until 2009.

== See also ==
Commons Category:Deller's café building, Taunton, Somerset
