= Love Is Blind (novel) =

2018 novel by William Boyd

- Paperback edition
- Author: William Boyd
- Publisher: Viking Penguin
- Publication date: 2018 (hardback); 2019 (paperback)
- Pages: 384
- ISBN: 978-0525655268
- Preceded by: Sweet Caress (2015)
- Followed by: Trio (2020)

Love Is Blind is a historical novel by William Boyd, published in 2018 by Viking Penguin. Set in the late 19th century, the novel follows the life of Brodie Moncur, a Scottish piano tuner who travels across Europe and Asia. The novel explores themes of love, ambition, and the transformative power of music. The novel includes Boyd’s regular use of rich historical detail and exploration of the cultural landscapes, in this case, of fin-de-siècle Europe. The story also reflects on the nature of obsession and the sacrifices made in the name of love.

The book is dedicated to Boyd's wife, Susan.

== Plot ==
Brodie Moncur, the son of a stern Scottish clergyman, seeks to escape his oppressive upbringing and finds employment with Channon & Co., a piano manufacturer in Edinburgh. His talents soon lead him to Paris, where he becomes involved in promoting the company’s pianos by associating with renowned musicians. In Paris, Brodie meets John Kilbarron, an acclaimed Irish pianist, and his mistress, Lika Blum, a Russian soprano. Brodie and Lika embark on a passionate affair, setting off a chain of events that lead them through St. Petersburg, Edinburgh, and beyond, as they navigate the complexities of love and the consequences of their choices.

== Reception ==
Reviewing the book in The Guardian, Alexander Larman described it as "a rapturous return to form" and commended its unpredictable narrative.

Carys Davies, also for The Guardian, described the novel as a "finely judged performance" that intertwines fact and fiction. She notes Boyd’s subtle references to Chekhov and explores how the protagonist’s life mirrors literary themes, adding depth to the narrative.

Zachary Woolfe, in a negative review in The New York Times, suggests that while the novel is "silkily written", it lacks depth, with pleasures that are "vaguely guilty" and a narrative that "swiftly vanishes from the mind". He critiques the book for being more style than substance.
