= Nat Tate: An American Artist 1928–1960 =

1998 book by William Boyd

- First edition
- Author: William Boyd
- Genre: Novel, presented as biography
- Publisher: Edition Stemmle
- Publication date: June 1998
- ISBN: 1-901785-01-7
- OCLC: 38934333
- Preceded by: Armadillo (1998)
- Followed by: Any Human Heart (2002)

Nat Tate: An American Artist 1928–1960 is a 1998 novel, presented as a biography, by the Scottish writer William Boyd. Nat Tate was an imaginary person, invented by Boyd and created as "an abstract expressionist who destroyed '99%' of his work and leapt to his death from the Staten Island ferry. His body was never found." At the time of the novel's launch, Boyd went some way to encourage the belief that Tate had really existed.

== Art hoax ==
Boyd published the book as a hoax, presented as a real biography. Gore Vidal, John Richardson (Picasso's biographer), Karen Wright (then editor of the influential Modern Painters magazine) and David Bowie (a board member of Modern Painters and co-director with Karen Wright of 21 Publishing, which published the book) were all participants in the hoax. "Nat Tate" is a combination of the names of two London art galleries, the National Gallery and the Tate Gallery. Boyd and his conspirators set about convincing the New York glitterati (social elites) that the reputation of this influential abstract expressionist needed to be re-evaluated.

Bowie held a launch party on April Fool's Day eve, 1998, and read extracts from the book, while Richardson talked about Tate's friendships with both Picasso and Braque. Vidal and Richardson supplied fake quotes to lend authenticity to the biography, with both of them suggesting that Tate was a "drunk".

About a week later, journalist David Lister, who was at the New York launch, reported in The Independent of London that "some of the biggest names in the art world have been the victims of a literary hoax", and the story was picked up by other newspapers, including The New York Times. He said that no one he spoke to claimed to know Tate well, but no one claimed not to have heard of him. He said he sniffed something fishy, since he appeared to be the only person in the room who had never heard of Tate. His suspicions were confirmed when he discovered that none of the galleries mentioned in the book actually existed. By January 2016, Lister had become The Independent's Arts Editor.

In reality, it appears that few were fooled and most of the big names in the arts world (including artists, collectors, art historian, art dealers, New York based writers like Paul Auster, and editors of literary journals) quickly realized that Nat Tate was a complete fake and that they had been the victims of an elaborate setup. Some of the paintings featured in the book were reportedly painted by Boyd and the hoax was made more believable by Gore Vidal's endorsement on the book's dust cover. Also, the photographs of Nat Tate that feature in the 'biography' are of unknown people from Boyd's own photographic collection.

Karen Wright, one of Bowie's co-directors at 21 Publishing, said the hoax was not meant to be malicious: "Part of it was, we were very amused that people kept saying 'Yes, I've heard of him.' There is a willingness not to appear foolish. Critics are too proud for that." Boyd, the main perpetrator of the hoax, agreed, saying "the doubts were meant to set in very quickly."

== Fictional biography ==
Nat Tate (fictional character)
- Born: Nathwell Tate; 7 March 1928; Union Beach, New Jersey, USA
- Died: 12 January 1960 (aged 31) off Staten Island, New York, USA
- Known for: Painting
- Notable work: Surviving works include: Portrait of K Bridge no. 114; Bridge no. 122 at least one un-numbered Bridge drawing

According to his inventor's fictitious biography, Nathwell "Nat" Tate was born "probably" in Union Beach, New Jersey on 7 March 1928. His father, for whom he was named, deserted the family before Tate's birth. From the age of 3, Tate, an only child, lived in Peconic, Long Island, New York, with his mother Mary, who worked as a kitchen maid for a wealthy family. Mary was killed in a traffic accident in February, 1936, shortly before Tate's eighth birthday, and Tate was subsequently adopted by the family with whom he and his mother had been living.

Always interested in painting and drawing, Tate studied painting with Hans Hofmann in Provincetown, Massachusetts from 1947 until 1950, and began showing his work in exhibitions of abstract art in New York City in 1952. His adoptive family supported Tate, paying for his lessons and also buying much of his artwork. Tate became a respected, albeit minor, figure in the New York art scene, appreciated by his peers, if somewhat obscure to the general public. A recurring motif in his works was the representation of bridges, which was partly inspired by his readings of the works of Hart Crane.

An alcoholic, Tate became increasingly irrational towards the end of the decade. After a trip to Europe in 1959, he became overwhelmed by the quality of art he saw there (especially that of Georges Braque, whom Tate briefly visited). On his return to America, Tate insisted on borrowing or buying back his paintings from their owners, so he could "improve" them. Apparently unhappy with his work, he then simply destroyed all of the paintings he reacquired—about 99% of his collected works, according to one estimate. Emulating the death of Hart Crane, Tate committed suicide on 12 January 1960, by jumping off the Staten Island Ferry.

== Later appearances ==
William Boyd included Nat Tate as a minor character in his 2002 novel Any Human Heart and in its 2010 TV adaptation.

In 2011, a painting by "Nat Tate" entitled Bridge no. 114 was auctioned at Sotheby's in London. The winning bid for the painting (which was actually by William Boyd) was £7,250, well above the expected price, with the purchaser later revealed to be English television personality Ant McPartlin. The money was given to the Artists' General Benevolent Institution.

== See also ==
- Sokal affair

== Sources ==
- Boyd, William (12 January 2016). "William Boyd: how David Bowie and I hoaxed the art world". The Guardian.
