= Trio (novel) =

2020 novel authored by William Boyd

- Author: William Boyd
- Cover artist: Elliott Erwitt (top); Grey Villet (bottom)
- Language: English
- Publisher: Viking Books
- Publication place: United Kingdom
- Preceded by: Love is Blind (2018)
- Followed by: The Romantic (2022)

Trio is a 2020 novel authored by William Boyd. Set primarily in Brighton, UK, in 1968, the trio of Boyd's title follows the lives of: Elfrida Wing, an alcoholic writer interested in the suicide of Virginia Woolf in Rodmell; Talbot Kydd, a closeted film producer; and Anny Viklund, an American actress who is having a secret affair with her co-star.

== Plot ==
The three characters are intertwined, the main narrative being the shooting in Brighton of a film produced by Kydd, starring Viklund and directed by Wing's husband. Viklund's ex-husband, a radical bomber then appears, having escaped from prison and demanding money from her. The FBI make contact with Viklund who then flees to Paris in the middle of the film. Kydd finds her and tries to convince her to complete the film. Meanwhile, Wing unsuccessfully attempts to mimic Woolf's suicide and so retreats to a rehab staffed by nuns.

== Reception ==
Edward Docx, in The Guardian, said: "This is a book about the absurd business of film-making, the desperate business of writing a novel and the ludicrous business of acting – and it’s superbly wry and wise and funny and truthful on all three subjects. But, beneath that, it’s really a novel about the correspondences between the inner and the outer lives of human beings: a novel, in other words, about identity" but Docx feels that Boyd "could have taken more risks in this book. I wanted him to deploy his formal talents to scream something, howl something, to weigh in. What was missing was madness, rage, despair, something existentially incandescent – whatever Boyd’s version of that might be."

The New York Times' reviewer James Lasdun also wanted more danger: "the narrative rapidly generates a prodigious quantity of subplots, each adding its own pressure to the general sense of impending disaster...More than just a clever authorial performance, the structure underpins a sustained preoccupation with the tension between fate and chance, art and accident, script and improvisation. For every turn of events, the story ingeniously suggests a multitude of other outcomes that might have occurred instead. By sheer luck, two of the titular trio survive close brushes with death, and find redemption. The third doesn’t, but just as easily might have. A sense of the fluky contingency of life lingers disquietingly...It seems churlish to wish — though I did — that the mission had been a touch more dangerous.

In The Washington Post, Ellen Akins wrote: "in the faraway, louche land of Brighton ("the Las Vegas of England," as one of the book's characters observes). There, everyone's a writer or director, an actor or photographer, or a bit of each, and the plight of a radical bomber can be played for laughs or pathos or a simple reminder that there really was something occasionally deadly happening in 1968 despite all the blinding sun and arc lights shining on Brighton Beach while characters of all sexual persuasions were thrilling to the timeworn pleasure of adultery and the new freedoms afforded by the lifting of inhibitions as well as age-old decency laws. Still, for all its brio, "Trio" hits some serious notes. It has a whiff of the ambivalent Graham Greene about it."

Allan Massie, writing in The Scotsman, praised the novel: "Here he has set himself the task of exploring three lives linked only by fortuitous circumstances while including them in a coherent narrative. It is a juggling act and he doesn’t drop a single ball. Trio is, as I say, a comic novel but one which is rich enough to admit sadness. There is exuberant comedy in, for instance, a ludicrous party given by a falsely-Falstaffian 'Great Actor', but there is also pain, misery, perplexity and grief. Boyd moves from one register to another without striking a false note. His sympathy for his characters is rooted in the recognition that most of us know ourselves imperfectly and seek to keep even this imperfect knowledge from others."
