= The Romantic (Boyd novel) =

2022 novel by William Boyd

- Author: William Boyd
- Publisher: Viking Penguin
- Publication date: 2022 (hardback); 2023 (paperback)
- Pages: 464
- ISBN: 9780241542033
- Preceded by: Trio (2020)
- Followed by: Gabriel's Moon (2024)

The Romantic is the seventeenth novel by British author William Boyd, published in 2022, by Viking Penguin. The book is another of Boyd's 'whole-life' fictional biographies. It follows the story of Cashel Greville Ross, an Irishman born in 1799, whose life traverses significant events and locales of the 19th century. Boyd employs a first-person narrative to chronicle Cashel's diverse roles and adventures, creating a narrative that intertwines fact and fiction.

The book is dedicated to Boyd's wife, Susan.

== Plot ==
The novel follows Cashel Greville Ross from his birth in County Cork, Ireland, through a life of transformation and exploration. Cashel's journey includes serving as a soldier in the East Indian Army, engaging with literary figures like Lord Byron and Percy Shelley in Pisa, embarking on expeditions in Africa in search of the Nile's source, and a spell in a debtors' prison. His life is characterized by a series of often unexpected reinventions, including stints as a writer, farmer, and diplomat, culminating in his role as a consul in Trieste. The narrative, framed as an edited autobiography discovered by 'W.B.', blends historical authenticity with imaginative storytelling.

== Reception ==
Daneet Steffens in The Boston Globe praised the novel, commenting: "This is the kind of novel that William Boyd does best, the tale of an Everyman caught in the waves of history, sometimes surviving by his wits, other times sinking by his shortcomings".

Writing in The Times Literary Supplement, Lindsey Hilsum commented positively on the fusion of fact and fiction writing: "Boyd’s books are so enjoyable that it’s hard for us to resent the tricks being played on us, even as we find ourselves constantly reaching for Google, wanting to know what is and isn’t real".

In a negative review in The Wall Street Journal, Brooke Allen complained that "The Romantic is a tired, spiritless piece of work, written as if Mr. Boyd was slogging dutifully through the formula he created and has previously used to better effect".
