= Dockside =

Dockside may refer to:

- Dockside Cannabis Museum
- Dockside Green
- Dockside Saloon and Restaurant
- Gator's Dockside
- Dockside ferry wharf
