= Jack Herer =

American author and activist (1939–2010)

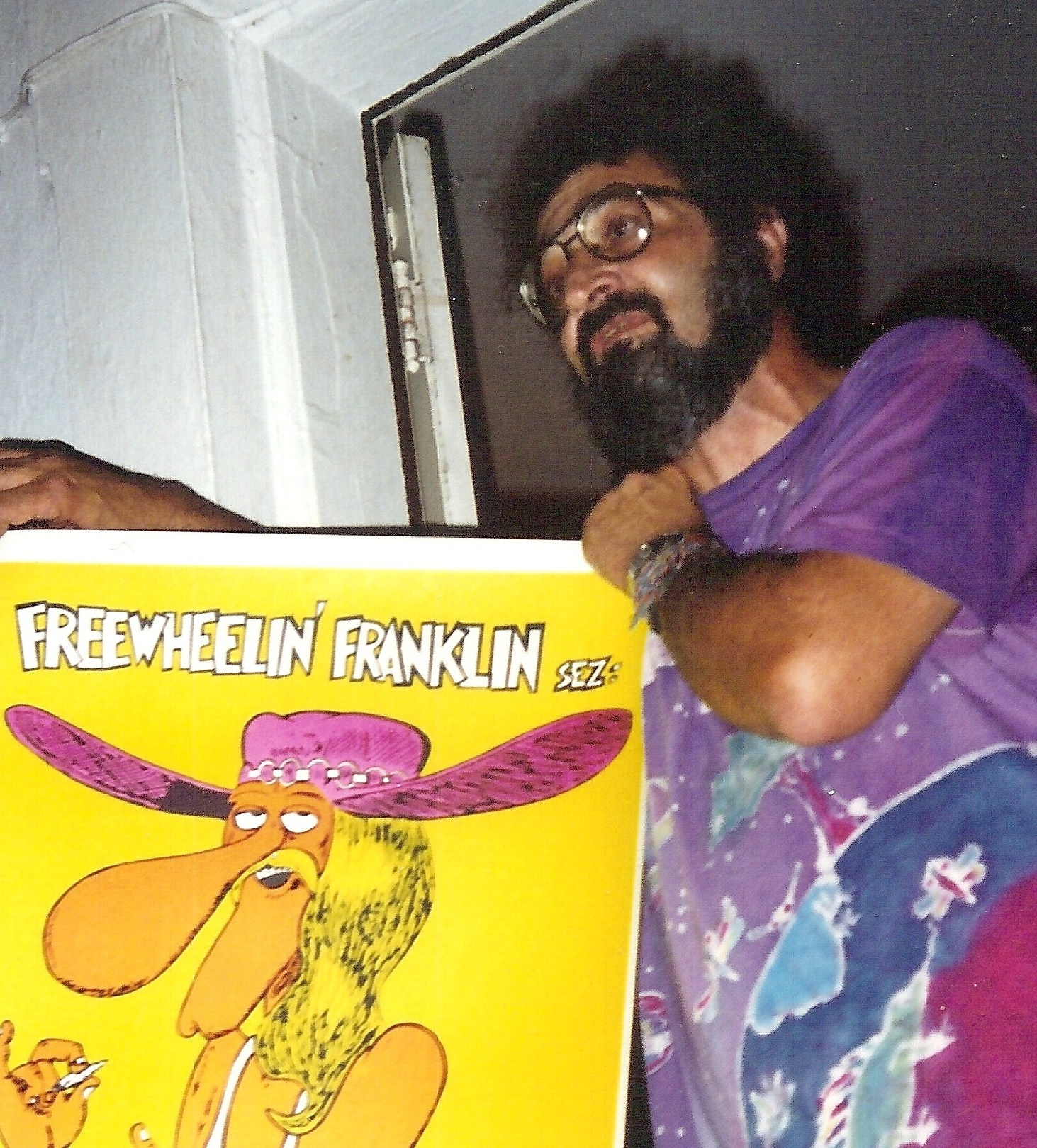
- Jack Herer in Washington, DC, in 1989.
- Born: June 18, 1939; Buffalo, New York, U.S.
- Died: April 15, 2010 (aged 70); Eugene, Oregon, U.S.
- Burial place: Eden Memorial Park Cemetery, Mission Hills, Los Angeles
- Other names: The Emperor of Hemp; The Hemperor
- Occupations: Activist, author
- Organizations: Help End Marijuana Prohibition (HEMP); Global Cannabis Community Founding Father; Front Line Freedom Fighter
- Known for: Third Eye Shoppe
- Notable work: The Emperor Wears No Clothes
- Children: 6

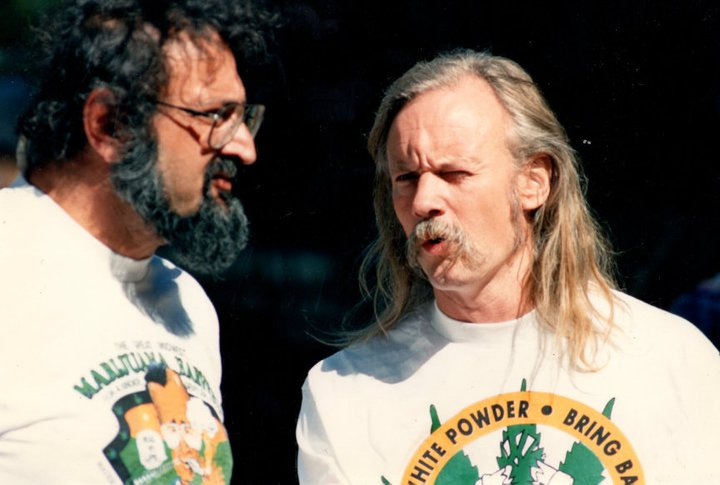
Jack Herer and Dana Beal at the September 1989 Great Midwest Marijuana Harvest Fest in Madison, Wisconsin.

Jack Herer (/ˈhɛrər/; June 18, 1939 – April 15, 2010), sometimes called the "Emperor of Hemp", was an American cannabis rights activist and the author of the 1985 book The Emperor Wears No Clothes. Herer founded and served as the director of the organization Help End Marijuana Prohibition (HEMP).

As an activist, he advocated for the decriminalization of the cannabis plant and argued that it could be used as a renewable source of fuel, medicine, food, fiber, and paper/pulp and that it can be grown in virtually any part of the world for medicinal as well as economic purposes. He further asserted that the U.S. government has been deliberately hiding the proof of this from its own citizens.

== Biography ==
An early glass pipe entrepreneur, Herer opened his first head shop in 1973.

In 1985, Herer self-published The Emperor Wears No Clothes, a book — in 2020 in its fourteenth edition after having been continuously in print for 35 years — frequently cited in efforts to decriminalize and legalize cannabis and to expand the use of hemp for industrial use.

In 1987, Herer opened the Third Eye Shoppe head shop in Portland, Oregon. Herer's son Mark Herer took over as the shop's owner in 2001. The Third Eye closed on March 31, 2017.

A former Goldwater Republican, Herer twice ran for President of the United States, in 1988 (1,949 votes) and 1992 (3,875 votes), as the Grassroots Party candidate.

=== Health problems and death ===
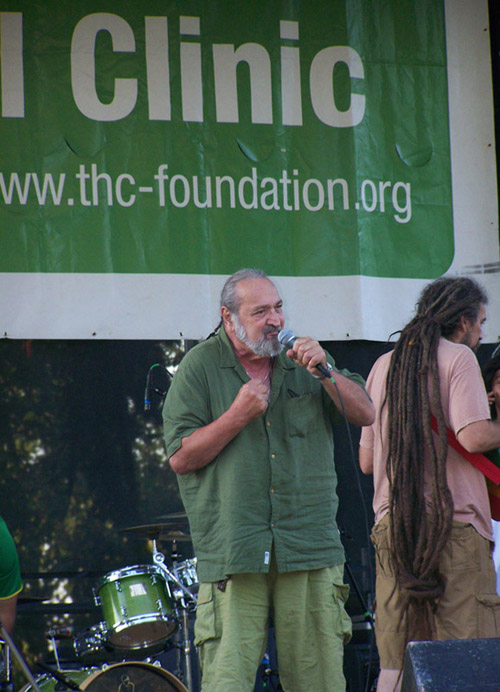
Herer speaking at the 2009 Hempstalk Festival, moments before his second heart attack

In July 2000, Herer suffered a minor heart attack and a major stroke while attending the BioFach trade show, resulting in difficulties speaking and moving the right side of his body. Herer mostly recovered, and claimed in May 2004 that treatment with the Amanita muscaria, a psychoactive mushroom, was the "secret".

On September 12, 2009, Herer suffered another heart attack while backstage at the Hempstalk Festival in Portland, Oregon.

He was discharged to another facility on October 13, 2009. Paul Stanford of The Hemp and Cannabis Foundation said, "He is waking up and gazing appropriately when someone is talking... but he is not really communicating in any way."

On April 15, 2010, Herer died in Eugene, Oregon, from complications related to the September 2009 heart attack. He was 70 years old at the time of his death. Herer was buried at the Eden Memorial Park Cemetery in Mission Hills, California.

== Criticism ==
European experts on hemp, like Dr. Hayo M.G. van der Werf, author of the doctoral thesis Crop physiology of fibre hemp (1994), and Dr. Ivan Bocsa criticized Herer for making unrealistic claims regarding the potential of hemp (cf. the work of Lyster Hoxie Dewey).

- Herer claimed that hemp produces higher yields than other crops. Van der Werf argued that is simply wrong. Under most favorable growing conditions, other crops such as maize, sugar beet, or potato produced similar dry matter yields. However, hemp fibre is in many ways superior to other crops under adverse growing conditions.
- Herer claimed that hemp hurds, which make up 60 to 80% of the stem dry weight, contain 77% cellulose. Van der Werf argued that is wrong. Cellulose content of hemp hurds has been found to vary between 32 and 38% (Bedetti and Ciaralli 1976, van der Werf 1994). Possibly, Herer confused the hurds, which form the woody core of the hemp stem, with the bark, which forms the outer layer of the hemp stem. The bark contains the long bast fibers which are used in textile manufacturing.

== Legacy ==
A sativa-dominant hybrid strain of cannabis was named after Herer in honor of his work. The Jack Herer strain was originally created by Sensi Seeds. Today almost all seed banks carry their own take on this famous cannabis favorite. This strain has won several awards, including the 7th High Times Cannabis Cup. Jack Herer was also inducted into the Counterculture Hall of Fame at the 16th Cannabis Cup in recognition of his first book.

Emperor of Hemp is a documentary made about Herer's life that aired on PBS stations throughout the U.S., and was translated into French and Spanish.

== Works ==
Books

- (with Al Emmanuel) G.R.A.S.S.: Great Revolutionary American Standard System: The Official Guide for Assessing the Quality of Marijuana on the 1 to 10 Scale (Primo Publications, 1973)
- The Emperor Wears No Clothes (Van Nuys, California: Ah Ha Publishing, 1985, 1990) ISBN 978-1878125002

Articles

- "Cannabis Medicines Banned," Totse.com, archived at the Wayback Machine — excerpt from The Emperor Wears No Clothes
- "Hemp for Victory — Coverup," Totse.com, archived at the Wayback Machine

== See also ==
- Legal history of cannabis in the United States
- List of civil rights leaders
- Gonzales v. Raich
- Health issues and the effects of cannabis
- Cannabis legalization in the United States
