= Hemp for Victory =

1942 American short film

Hemp For Victory
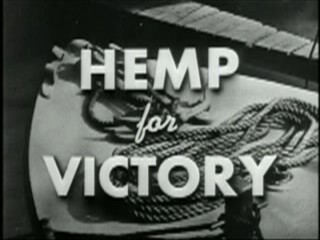
- Directed by: Raymond Evans
- Written by: Brittain B. Robinson
- Produced by: U.S. Department of Agriculture
- Starring: Lee D. Vickers (Narrator)
- Music by: Reuben Ford (Monaural)
- Release date: 1942
- Running time: 14 minutes
- Language: English

Hemp for Victory, full film

Hemp for Victory is a black-and-white United States government film made during World War II and released in 1942, explaining the uses of hemp, encouraging farmers to grow as much as possible. During World War II, the Marihuana Tax Act of 1937 was lifted briefly to allow for hemp fiber production to create ropes for the U.S. Navy but after the war marijuana reverted to its de facto illegal status.

== History ==
The film was made to encourage farmers to grow hemp for the war effort because other industrial fibers, often imported from overseas, were in short supply. The film shows a history of hemp and hemp products, how hemp is grown, and how hemp is processed into rope, cloth, cordage and other products.

Before 1989, the film was relatively unknown. The United States government denied ever having made such a film. The United States Department of Agriculture library and the Library of Congress told all interested parties that no such movie was made by the USDA or any branch of the U.S. government. Two VHS copies were recovered and donated to the Library of Congress on 19 May 1989 by Maria Farrow, Carl Packard, and Jack Herer.

The only known copy in 1976 was a 3/4" broadcast quality copy of the film that was originally obtained by William Conde in 1976 from a reporter for the Miami Herald and the Ethiopian Zion Coptic Church of Jamaica. It was given in trust that it would be made available to as many as possible. It was put into the hands of Jack Herer by William Conde during the 1984 Oregon Marijuana Initiative. The film is now available in numerous locations on the Internet.

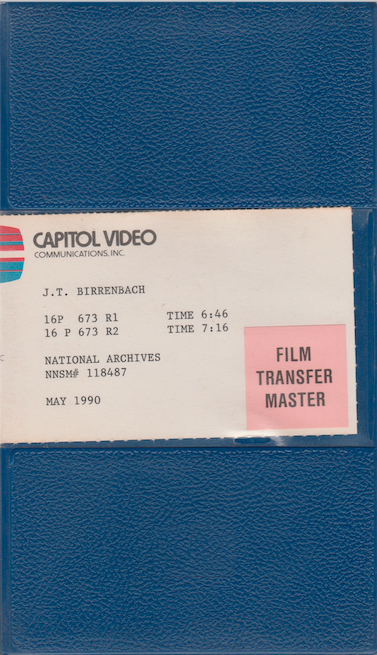
The 1990 case that the film Hemp For Victory was delivered in

In July 1989, Jack Herer together with Chris Wright, of the Grassroots Party, attempted to obtain a copy from the National Archives where it was listed, but the curators were unable to locate the film. Subsequently, in May 1990, the founder of The Institute for Hemp, John Birrenbach, recovered a copy of the film from the National Archives. The film consists of two sections; the first section being 6 minutes and 46 seconds long, and the second being 7 minutes 16 seconds long. Together, the 15 minute film detailed the cultivation of hemp for fiber. This was the first recovery of the film from a government source. This film can now be downloaded from the National Archives.

Hemp for Victory was produced by the US Department of Agriculture, and contained scenes from the 1926 silent film Old Ironsides. It is public domain and is freely available for download from the Internet Archive.

The film, as well as clips shown, was referenced to in an episode of 10 Things You Don't Know About on marijuana and its history.

== Book ==
Hemp for Victory is also the title of a book about hemp, published 2006 in London by Whitaker Press (ISBN 0-9549939-0-X). It is the work of several authors active in the hemp world, including Kenyon Gibson, Nick and Cindy Mackintosh, Woody Harrelson, Mina Hegaard and Sam Heslop.

== Sequel ==
In 2006, efforts were made to make a sequel to the film, Hemp For Victory II: The Sequel by the UK-based production house Necessary Productions. Starring David Hayman, Howard Marks and Jack Herer, the funds for post production were not raised and the project was shelved.

It was then developed as a three film series of 60 minutes each. The second part released at the 2009 Seattle HempFest had Steve Levine and Andrea Hermann on the speaker panel. The movie did not have a full official release. It was released as a 2012 remake at select locations. The conceptualisation of the film was based on inputs from Smithsonian Institution, Greenpeace, MardiGrass, Robert West, Dr Tapan Kumar Pradhan, Howard Marks, Vote Hemp, John Hobson (Hemcore), Hilary Benn, Marc Deeley and other research institutes.

== Gallery ==
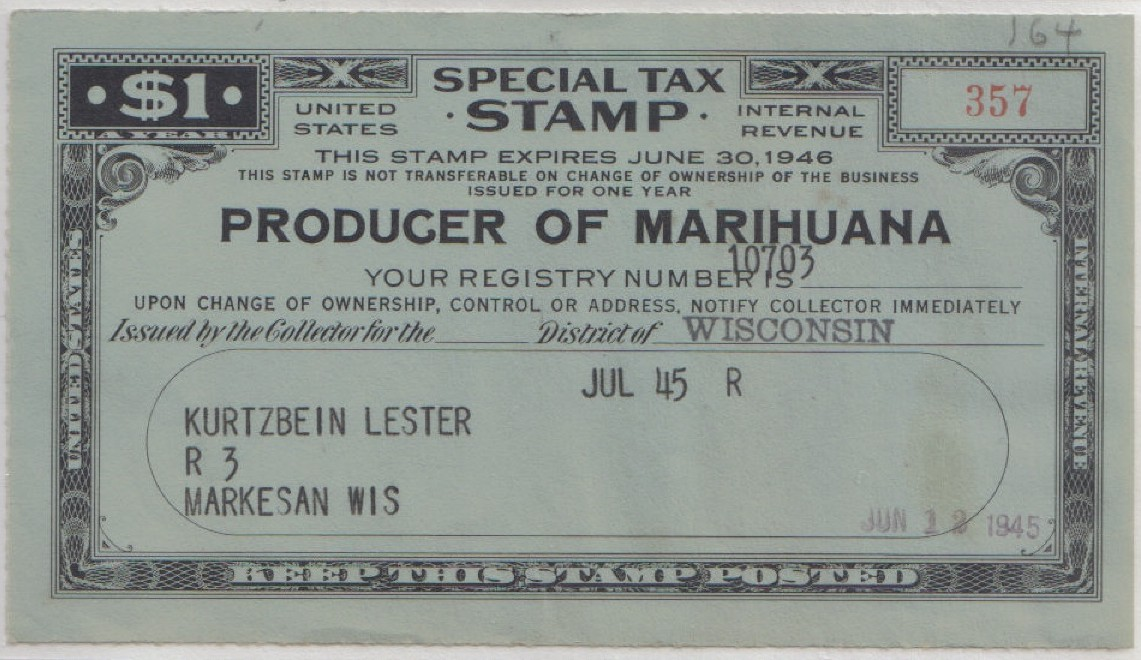
Tax stamp for a producer of hemp

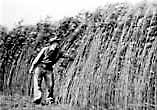
Hemp farm

== See also ==
- Cannabis College
- The Emperor Wears No Clothes
- Legal history of cannabis in the United States
- List of films in the public domain in the United States
- Reefer Madness, 1936 film
- United States home front during World War II
