= Cannabis Museum (Japan) =

Japanese museum

- 大麻博物館 (Taima Hakubutsukan)
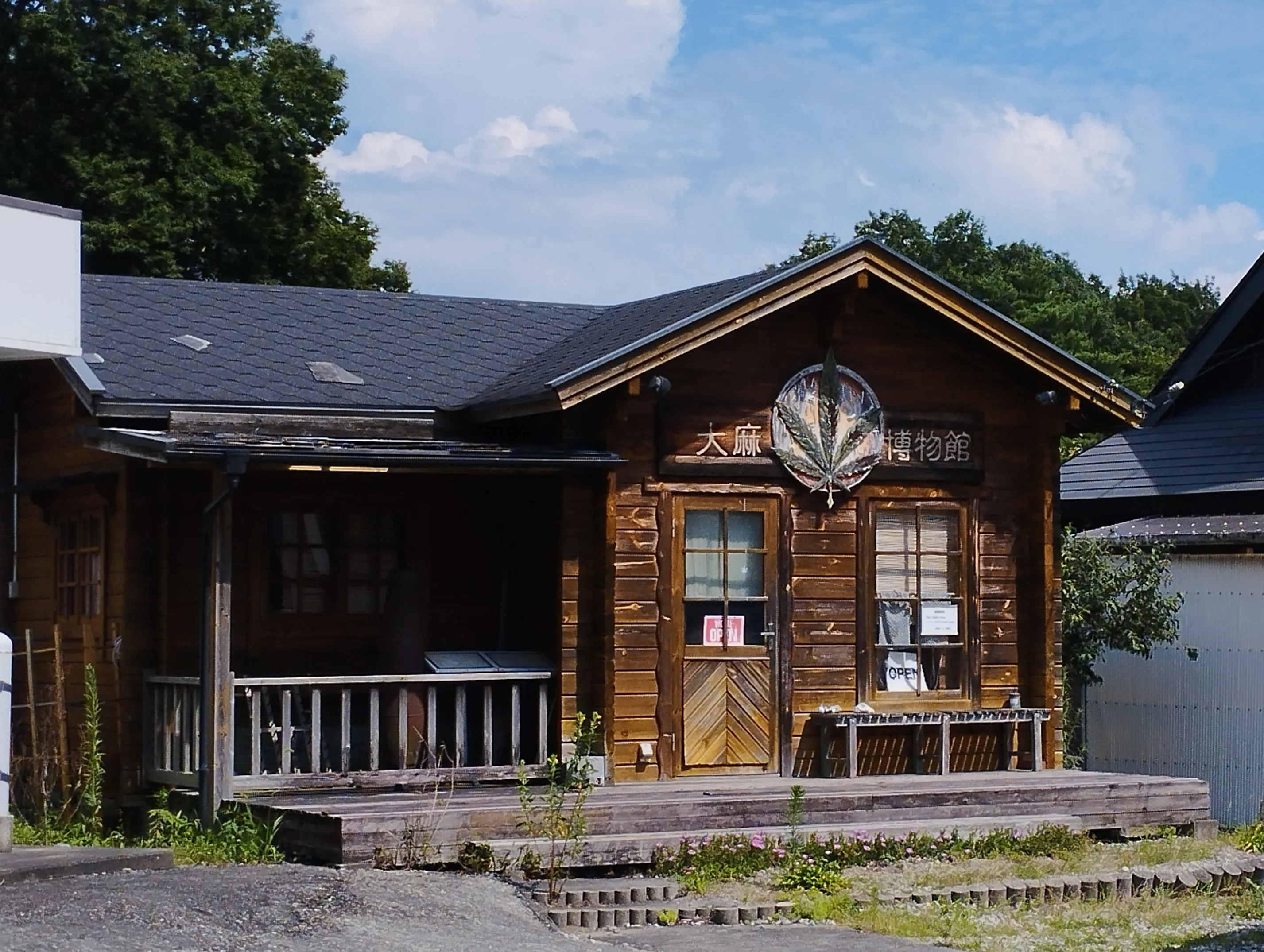
- Established: December 2001; 24 years ago
- Location: Nasu, Tochigi Prefecture, Japan
- Coordinates: 37°1′17.4″N 140°1′43.32″E
- Type: Private
- Founder: Junichi Takayasu
- Public transit access: Kuroiso Station
- Website: taimahak.jp

The Cannabis Museum (Japanese: 大麻博物館, Hepburn: Taima Hakubutsukan) is a private museum located in Nasu, Tochigi Prefecture, Japan. Founded in December 2001 by Japanese hemp rights advocate Junichi Takayasu, it is the sole museum devoted to the history and cultivation of cannabis in Japan.

The museum closed in July 2025 due to government pressure.

== History ==
The Cannabis Museum was founded by Junichi Takayasu, noted by The Japan Times as "one of Japan’s leading experts on cannabis". Takayasu developed an interest in the cultivation of hemp from books he read as a child in which ninjas trained by jumping over cannabis plants. The museum, which operates out of a log house in Nasu, Tochigi Prefecture, opened in December 2001 as an institution focused on the history of cannabis in Japan. It is the sole museum in Japan dedicated to cannabis, and is particularly focused on the history of cannabis in Tochigi; the prefecture is both historically and presently a significant producer of hemp, and as of 2007, cultivates approximately 90 percent of Japan's commercial hemp.

== Exhibits and collections ==
The museum is broadly focused on the history of cannabis and its related agriculture and technology; the preservation of historical hemp-related artifacts; and public education on the practical uses of hemp. As cannabis remains illegal in Japan for personal and medicinal use (Note: Licenses for the cultivation of hemp for use as fabrics and as seeds for consumption are granted by some local governments in Japan; hemp products are also legal for import.) and strong social stigmas remain attached to cannabis, the museum seeks to raise awareness of both the benefits of hemp and the differences between hemp and marijuana.

Items in the museum's collection include 17th century woodblock prints of women spinning hemp fibres, historical photographs of hemp farmers, and a working loom used to demonstrate hemp weaving. The museum also contains an interactive exhibit focused on the quality of hemp textiles, where visitors can compare the softness of hemp to other fabrics such as linen. Tours of Tochigi's legal hemp farms are also offered.

== Transportation access ==
The Cannabis Museum is located off of the Nasu interchange on the Tōhoku Expressway. It is served by the Nasu Yumoto bus line, which connects to Kuroiso Station operated JR East.

== See also ==
- Tochigishiro, a hemp strain cultivated in Tochigi Prefecture
- Cannabis Museum
