= Montevideo Cannabis Museum =

Museum in Montevideo, Uruguay

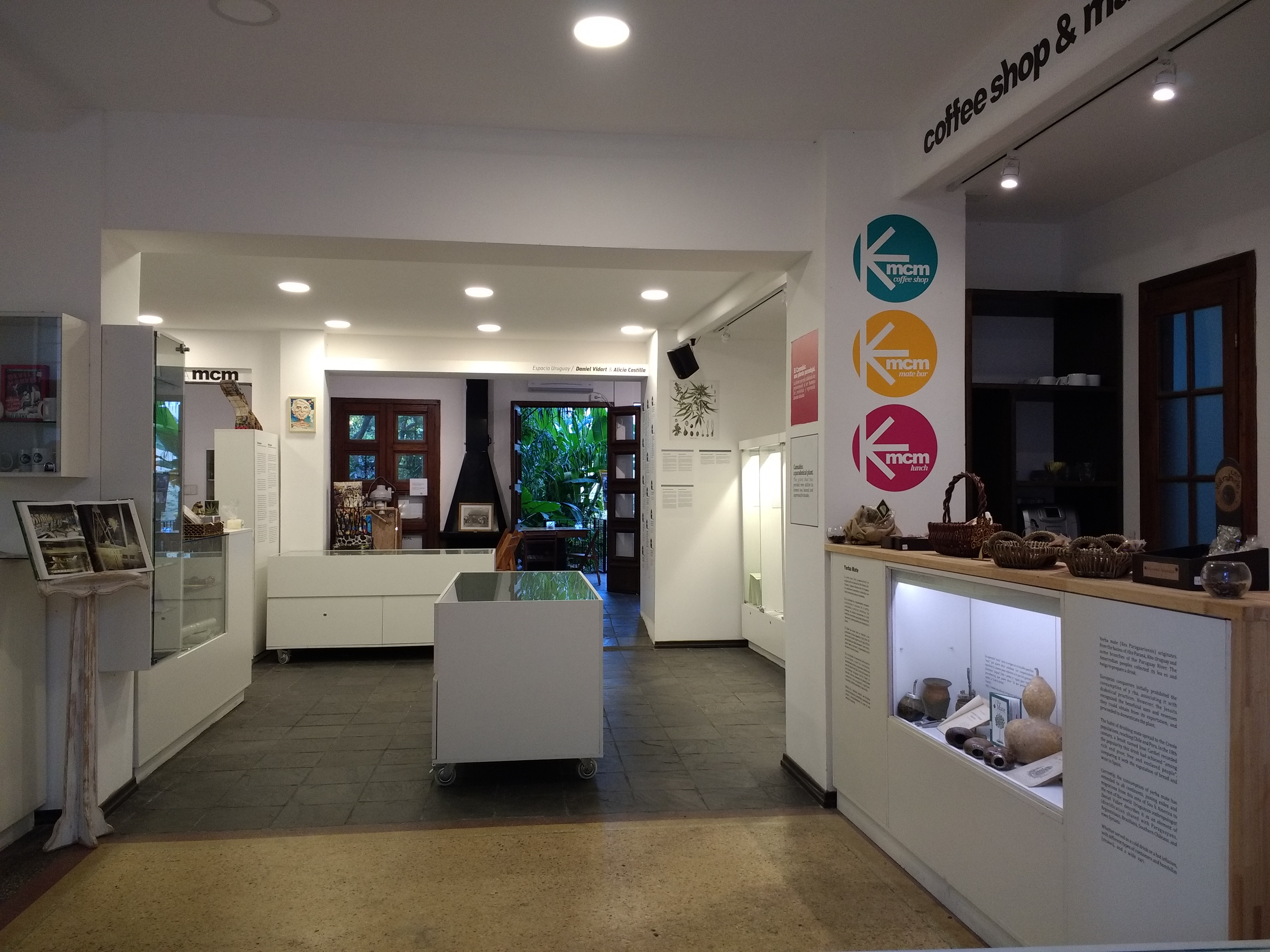
Interior

The Montevideo Cannabis Museum opened in December 2016, inspired by the legalization of cannabis in Uruguay in 2013. Some of the collection came from the Hash, Marihuana & Hemp Museum in Amsterdam. Other parts of the collection came from Hempstead Project Heart in San Rafael, California, an organization dedicated to the legalization of hemp in the United States.

== See also ==
- List of museums in Montevideo
- Cannabis Museum
