= List of hemp varieties =

This is a list of agricultural varieties of hemp.

== For European production ==
- Adzelvieši
- Armanca
- Asso
- Austa SK
- Beniko
- Bialobrzeskie (Białobrzeskie)
- Cannakomp
- Carma
- Carmagnola (Carmagnola selezionata), an Italian dioecious variety
- Carmaleonte
- Chamaeleon
- Codimono
- CS
- Dacia Secuieni
- Delta-405
- Delta-llosa
- Denise
- Diana
- Dioica 88
- Earlina 8 FC
- Eletta Campana
- Epsilon 68
- Fedora 17, a French dioecious variety
- Felina 32, a French dioecious variety
- Ferimon (Férimon), a French dioecious variety
- Fibranova, an Italian dioecious variety
- Fibrante
- Fibrol
- Fibror 79
- Finola
- Futura 75
- Glecia
- Gliana
- Glyana
- Henola
- Ivory
- KC Bonusz
- KC Dora
- KC Virtus
- KC Zuzana
- KCA Borana
- Kompolti hibrid TC
- Kompolti
- Lipko
- Lovrin 110
- Marcello
- Markant
- Monoica
- Rajan
- Ratza
- Santhica 23
- Santhica 27
- Santhica 70
- Secuieni Jubileu
- Silvana
- Succesiv
- Szarvasi
- Tiborszallasi
- Tisza
- Tygra
- Uniko B
- Uso-31
- Villanova
- Wielkopolskie
- Wojko
- Zenit

== For Canadian production ==
The following cultivars were approved by Health Canada for the 2024 growing season:

=== Newly Approved Cultivars (Not in Commercial Production) ===
- Angelo
- Chola
- Citrico
- EL1-140
- EL1-65
- EL1-68/134
- IPB45
- Jurassic
- Madre Seis
- Marina
- Nadine
- NWG 2463
- NWG 4000
- Pembina
- Rak
- Rogue
- Stalker
- T3H2006
- Vendetta
- Visoka

=== Cultivars in Commercial Production ===
- Altair
- Ambassador
- Angie
- Anka
- Bialobrzeskie
- Bountiful
- CanMa
- Carmagnola
- CBF1
- CFX-2
- CNAP 1HOH
- CRS-1
- CS
- Duchess
- Eighty Eight
- ESTA-1
- Ferimon
- Finola
- Grandi
- GranMa
- Henola
- HURV19PAN
- Indigo
- Joey
- Katani
- Mamma Maria
- Marie
- Martha
- NWG 2730
- Painted Lady
- Picolo
- Quida
- Santiam
- Scarlett
- Silesia
- Umpqua
- Vega
- X59 (Hemp Nut)

=== Cultivars Not in Commercial Production (Not Seeded, Retired or Withdrawn) ===
- Alyssa
- Carmen
- CFX-1
- Crag
- CW1AS1
- Delores
- Deni
- Fasamo
- Fedrina 74
- Felina 34
- Fibranova
- Fibriko
- Fibrimon 24
- Fibrimon 56
- Georgina
- Judy
- Jutta
- Kompolti Kompolti Hibrid TC
- Kompolti Sargaszaru
- Laura Secord
- Lovrin 110
- Maureen Petera
- UC-RGM
- Uniko B
- USO 14
- USO 31
- Victoria
- Yvonne
- Zolotonosha 11
- Zolotonosha 15

== For Japanese production ==
- Tochigishiro
