= Junichi Takayasu =

Japanese advocate (born 1963)

Junichi Takayasu (高安淳一, Takayasu Jun’ichi) (born 1963) is a Japanese hemp rights advocate, considered "one of Japan’s leading experts on cannabis". He is the curator of the Taima Hakubutsukan (Cannabis Museum) in Nasu, Tochigi Prefecture, which he founded in 2001. He also organizes an annual tour to the legal farms around the museum, and a monthly workshop to teach cannabis fiber weavering.

== Biography ==
At age 3, Junichi Takayasu read a picture book with ninjas jumping over marijuana plants, which set his mind on becoming a cannabis grower later in his life.

== See also ==
- Cannabis in Japan
