= Tochigishiro =

Strain of hemp

- Genus: Cannabis
- Species: sativa
- Cultivar: Tochigishiro
- Breeder: Itsuo Nishioka
- Origin: Kyushu University and Tochigi Agricultural Experiment Station in Tochigi, Japan

Tochigishiro (Japanese: とちぎしろ) is a cultivar of hemp grown in Tochigi Prefecture, Japan. It meets international standards of non-narcotic agricultural hemp at about 0.2% THC, reckoned "remarkably low" by Sensi Seeds. It was grown in the early 20th century at Arlington Experimental Farm near the United States capital. The modern variety was developed beginning in 1973 by Kyushu University professor of pharmacy Itsuo Nishioka from seeds "found in southern Japan", and completed c. 1982 by the Tochigi prefectural government at Tochigi Agricultural Experiment Station in Tochigi-shi. According to a National Institute of Mental Health-affiliated researcher, the strain is missing the enzyme tetrahydrocannabinolic acid synthase that makes most Cannabis capable of producing THC. It is the most widely grown cultivar in Japan in the 21st century, being exempt from prohibition under the Cannabis Control Law, due to its low levels of psychoactive chemicals. Approximately 90% of the hemp grown in Japan is the Tochigishiro variety (as of 2007).

A research report on an experimental plot at Kitami Agricultural Experimental Station on Hokkaido suggests that it may be the most productive known crop for biomass, yielding 52.7 tonnes/ha in a single season. The crop grows about 3 metres (9.8 ft) tall.

== See also ==
- List of hemp varieties
