= Saya Takagi =

Japanese actress

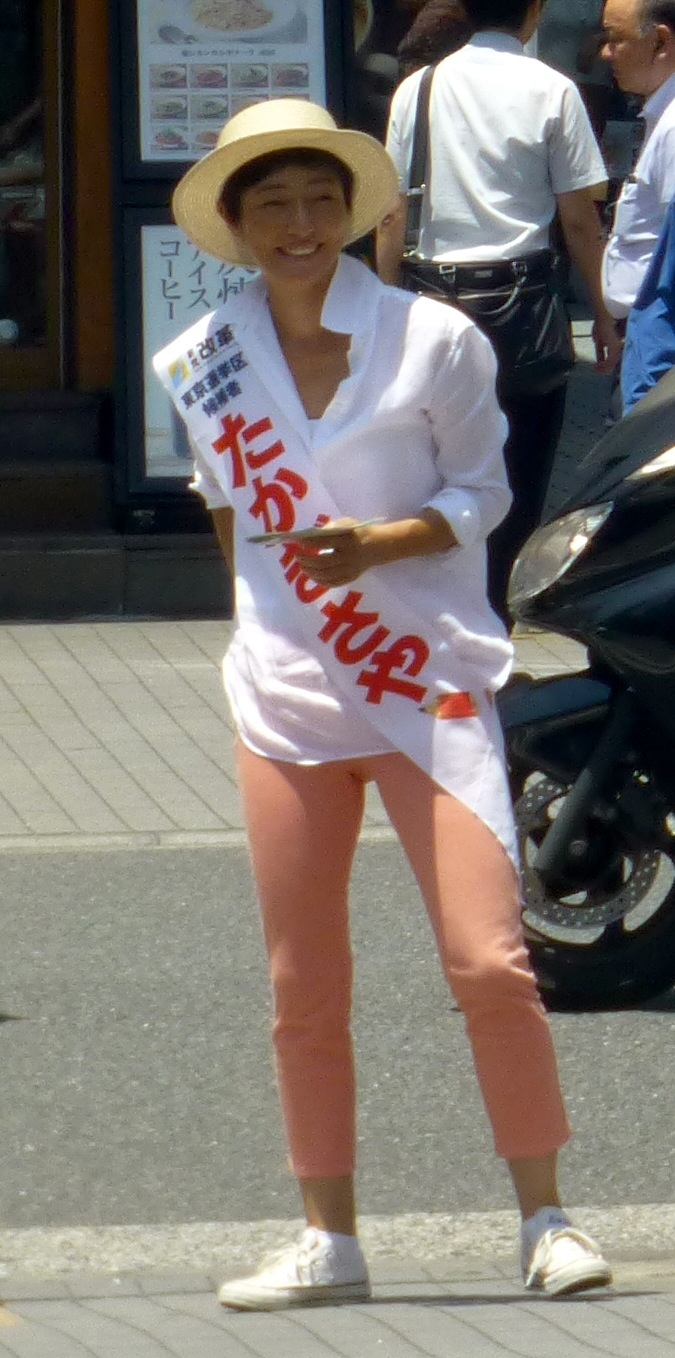
Saya Takagi in 2016

Saya Takagi (高樹 沙耶, Takagi Saya; b. 21 August 1963 in Hamamatsu as Ikue Masudo) is a Japanese actress turned activist for the legalization of cannabis in Japan.

== Biography ==
Saya Takagi started smoking cannabis when she was 17. In 1994, she became famous with her the role of Kashiwagi Reiko in the Japanese drama film Okane ga Nai.

In 2012, after the 2011 Tōhoku earthquake and tsunami, Saya Takagi decided to abandon the world of entertainment to become more involved in environmental activism, and adopted a self-sufficient lifestyle.

In 2016, Saya Takagi, then manager for the Cannabis Inspection Committee, ran for an Upper House seat with the New Renaissance Party, with medical cannabis as one of her platforms.

In October 2016, she was arrested at her guesthouse in Okinawa for possession of 55 grammes (2 oz) of cannabis, and in April 2017 was sentenced to a one-year suspended prison sentence, after having spent six months in jail.
