= Cannabis College =

Dutch Cannabis information centre

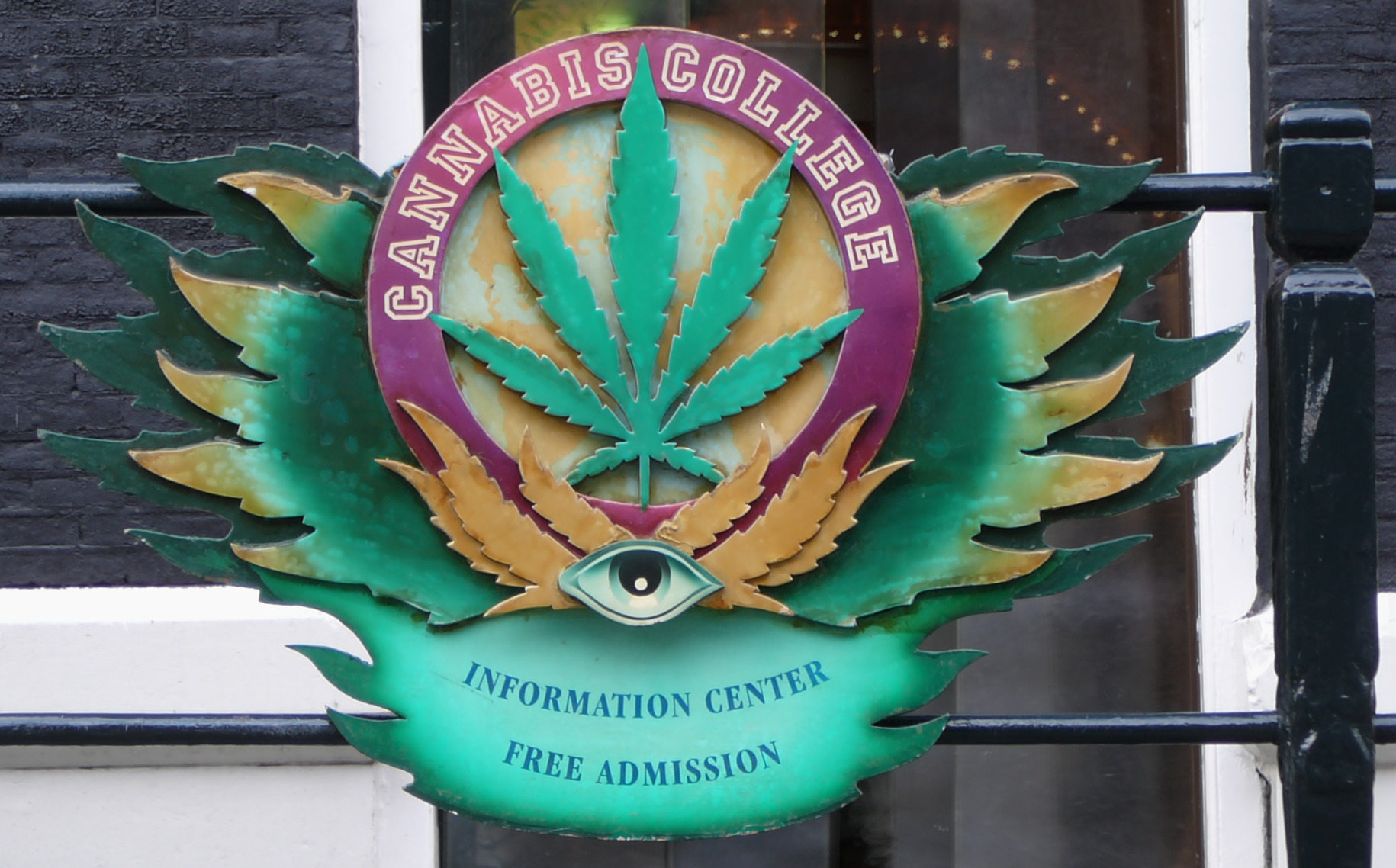
Cannabis College entrance.

The Cannabis College is a non-profit information centre located in the centre of Amsterdam's historic Red Light District in The Netherlands. Opened in 1998, the info centre features displays of the many and varied uses for Cannabis sativa and industrial hemp, as well as the history of human interaction with the plant. Everything from hemp building materials and plastics to medical Cannabis and worldwide legislation is covered.

The basement of the building hosts an organic flowering Cannabis garden, cultivated by an expert grower and utilizing some of the most reliable strains and popular organic nutrients.

There is also a Cannabis College in Garberville, California.

== See also ==
- Hemp for Victory (film)
