= Hemp Museum (Berlin) =

German museum

Coordinates: 52°31′00″N 13°24′29″E

- Hanf Museum
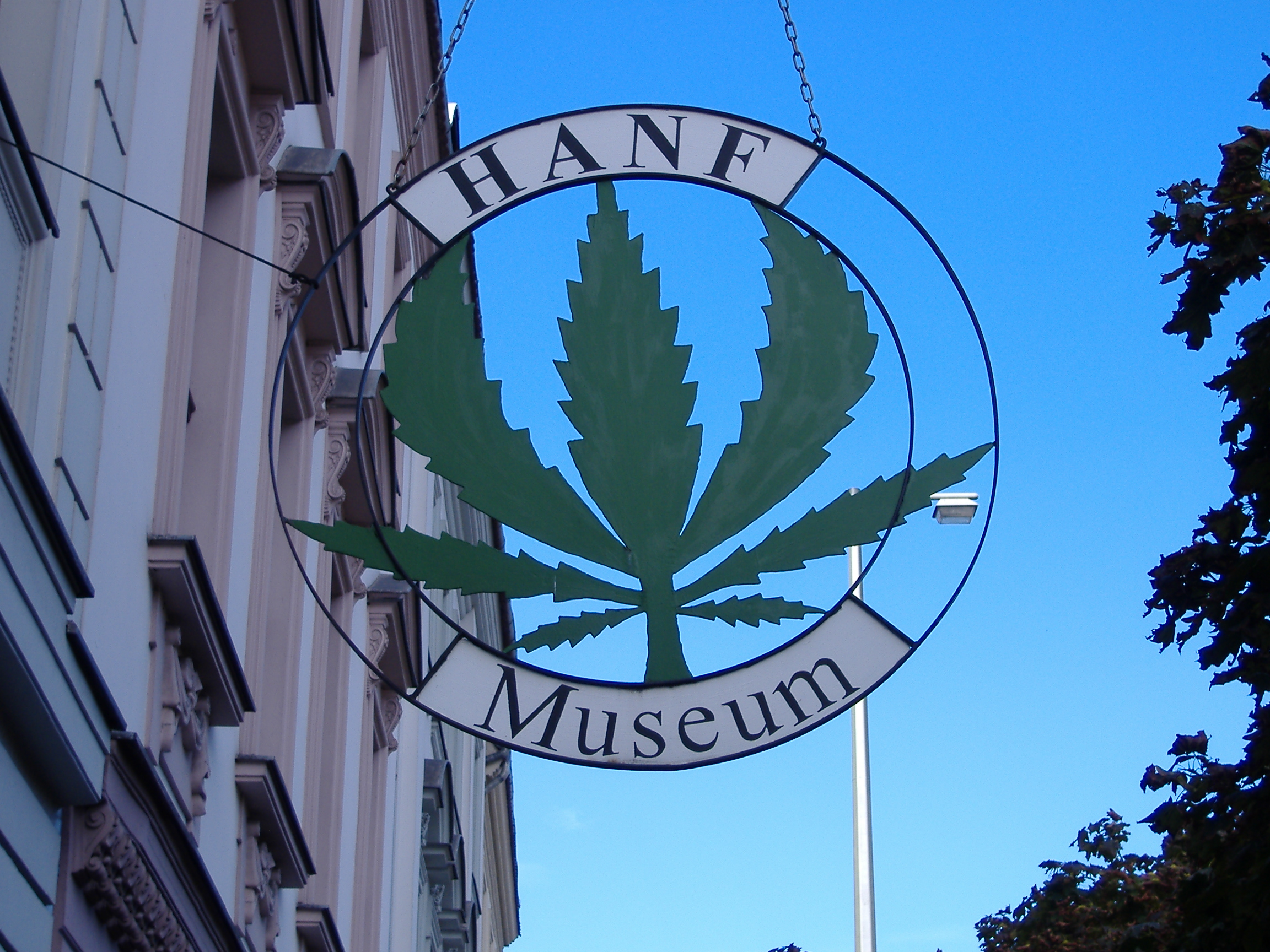
- Established: 6 December 1994
- Location: Berlin-Mitte, Mühlendamm 5
- Accreditation: DE-MUS-905915
- Owner: H.A.N.F. e. V.
- Website: www.hanfmuseum.de

The Hemp Museum (German: Hanf Museum Berlin) was opened in Berlin on 6 December 1994. It is the only museum in Germany focused on the cannabis plant. The museum also actively promotes the protection of children and young people and offers individually tailored tours of the exhibition with care staff. It serves as a meeting place for the organisers of the Hanfparade. The Hanf Museum regularly takes part in the "Long Night of Museums", the Berlin Fairytale Days and the Historale which takes place in the Nikolai Quarter. In 2017, the Hanf Museum took part in the Kirchentag in Berlin as a self-organised event on the topic of the war on drugs with speakers from South American victims, including the Reverend Martin Diaz from El Salvador.

== About the exhibition ==
The exhibition covers around 250 m^{2} (2700 sq. ft.) and presents everything to do with cultivated plants. Starting with the general presentation, the growth and cultivation, the harvesting and processing of hemp is described from a historical perspective. Furthermore, the numerous possibilities of use are presented and consumer products are presented. The importance of hemp for different cultures of the world and also as a drug is illuminated. Special exhibitions, such as on cannabis as a medical law of 19 February 2017, supplement the current status.

The exhibition also documents the history of prohibition of THC-containing hemp.

Selected artists can present their works in the cellar. There is an opportunity to linger, watch films and talk to each other.

== See also ==
- Cannabis Museum
