= Cannabis Museum =

Cannabis Museum, Hemp Museum, or Marijuana Museum may refer to:

== Museums ==
- Cannabis Museum (Japan), in Japan
- Dockside Cannabis Museum, in the United States
- Hemp Museum (Berlin), in Germany
- Hemp Museum Gallery, in Spain
- Hash, Marihuana & Hemp Museum, in the Netherlands
- Montevideo Cannabis Museum, in Uruguay
- Musée du Fumeur, in France
- Whakamana Cannabis Museum, in New Zealand

== Arts, entertainment and media ==
- The Hemp Museum (album), a 1996 album by American rapper B-Legit
