= Japanese Medical Marijuana Association =

The Japanese Medical Marijuana Association (Japanese: 医療大麻を考える会, Iryō taima o kangaeru kai) was founded in 1999 and seeks to improve access to medical cannabis. Its status under Japanese law is Specified Nonprofit Corporation (特定非営利活動法人). Due to the illegality of cannabis in Japan, the organization has investigated leveraging legal medical cannabis in Guam for Japanese patients.

In 2014, JMMA president Koichi Maeda met with Guamanian senator Tina Muna Barnes regarding Guam's medical cannabis program. In 2017, Maeda returned and met with governor Eddie Calvo. Maeda's intent was to develop Guam as a destination for Japanese people seeking cannabis remedies, and for the JMMA to promote cannabis medical tourism to Guam.

Japan's strict laws prevent Japanese citizens from using cannabis even when outside of Japan. However, Maeda stated that Japanese citizens with incurable diseases would be exempt from this law.

== See also ==
- Cannabis in Japan
