= The Emperor Wears No Clothes =

1985 non-fiction book written by Jack Herer

- Author: Jack Herer
- Language: English
- Genre: Social history
- Publisher: Ah Ha Publishing, Quick American Archives (11th Edition)
- Publication date: 1985
- Publication place: United States
- Media type: Print (Paperback)
- Pages: 330
- ISBN: 978-1878125002

The Emperor Wears No Clothes is a non-fiction book written by Jack Herer. Starting in 1973, the story begins when Herer takes the advice of his friend, "Captain" Ed Adair, and begins compiling tidbits of information about the cannabis plant and its numerous uses, including as hemp and as a drug. After a dozen years of collecting and compiling historical data, Herer first published his work as The Emperor Wears No Clothes, in 1985. The twelfth edition was published in November 2010, and the book continues to be cited in Cannabis rescheduling and re-legalization efforts.

Since its release in 1985, the book has sold over 800,000 copies worldwide

The book, backed by H.E.M.P. (United States), Hanf Haus (Germany), Sensi Seeds/Hash, Marihuana & Hemp Museum, Amsterdam, (Netherlands), and T.H.C., the Texas Hemp Campaign (United States), offers $100,000 to anyone who can disprove the claims made within. Quoting from the book's back cover:

If all fossil fuels and their derivatives, as well as trees for paper and construction were banned in order to save the planet, reverse the Greenhouse Effect and stop deforestation; then there is only one known annually renewable natural resource that is capable of providing the overall majority of the world's paper and textiles; meet all of the world's transportation, industrial and home energy needs, while simultaneously reducing pollution, rebuilding the soil, and cleaning the atmosphere all at the same time... and that substance is -- the same one that did it all before -- Cannabis Hemp... Marijuana!

The title of the book alludes to Hans Christian Andersen's classic fairy tale "The Emperor's New Clothes" (1837). Herer uses Andersen's story as an allegory for the prohibition of cannabis in certain places.

== See also ==
- List of books about cannabis
- Chemurgy
