= Third Eye Shoppe =

Defunct head shop in Portland, Oregon, U.S.

Coordinates: 45°30′42.4″N 122°37′18.6″W

- Logo

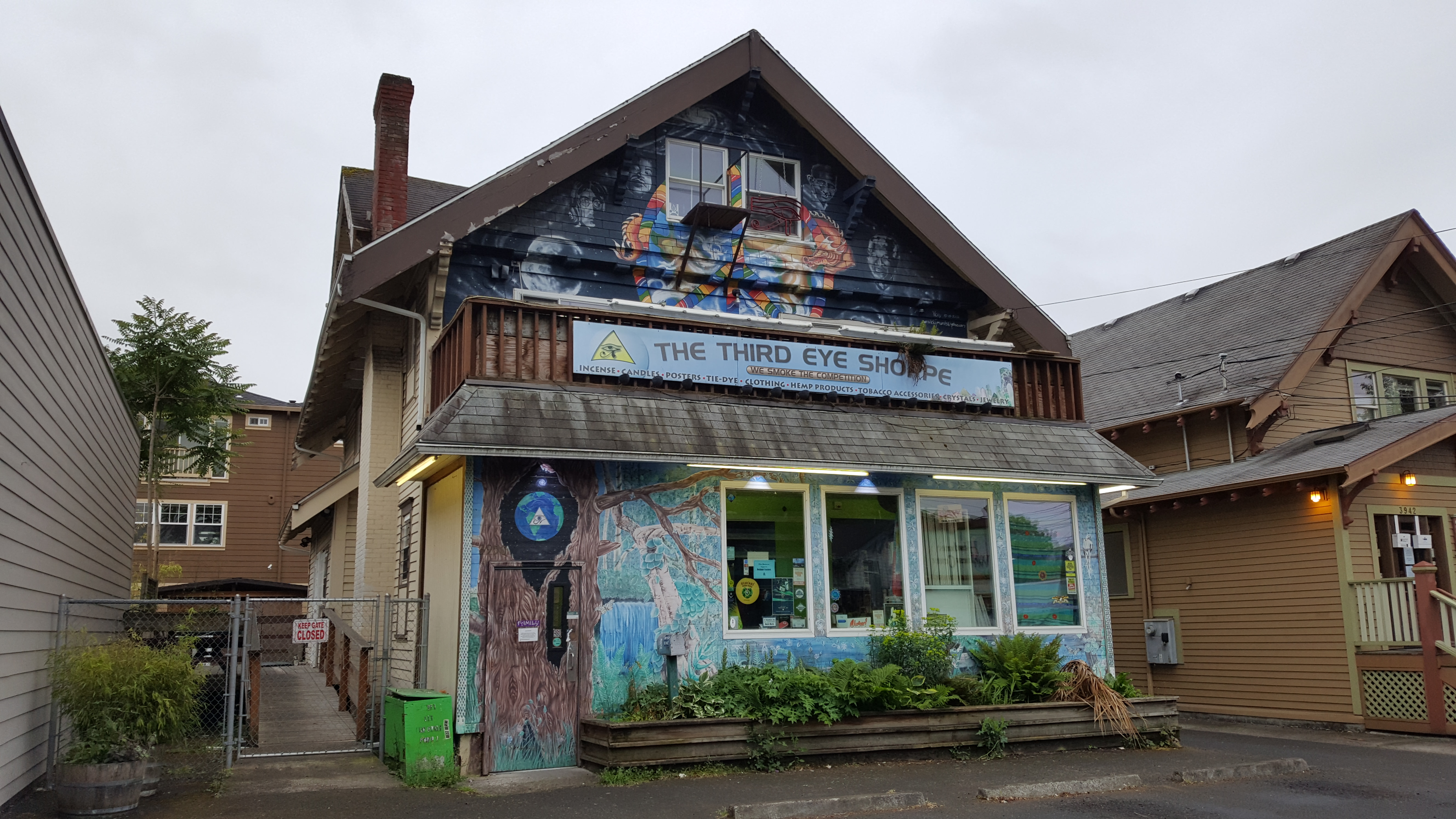
- The head shop's front exterior in June 2017, after closing three months prior
- Company type: Head shop
- Founded: July 1, 1987; 38 years ago in Portland, Oregon, U.S.
- Defunct: March 31, 2017
- Headquarters: 3950 Southeast Hawthorne Boulevard, Portland, Oregon, U.S.
- Owner: Jack Herer (1987–2001); Mark Herer (2001–2017)

Third Eye Shoppe, commonly known as The Third Eye, was a head shop in Portland, Oregon's Hawthorne district and Richmond neighborhood, in the United States. The shop was founded in 1987 and owned by cannabis and counterculture activist Jack Herer. His son, Mark Herer, took over as the shop's owner in 2001. The Third Eye closed on March 31, 2017, as a result of declining sales, development of the surrounding neighborhood, increasing health care costs, and increased competition. For nearly thirty years, the shop was associated with Portland's cannabis culture and recreational drug tourism, and was included in Willamette Week's annual "Best of Portland" reader's poll several times.

== Description ==
The Third Eye was a head shop on Southeast Hawthorne Boulevard, near its intersection with Southeast Cesar Chavez Boulevard (formerly Southeast 39th Avenue), in southeast Portland's Richmond neighborhood. The store sold common head shop paraphernalia, including: bongs, books, bumper stickers, clothing, crystals, Grateful Dead and Jerry Garcia memorabilia, hookahs, incense, posters, rolling papers, tie-dyed shirts, and vaporizers. According to The Oregonian, The Third Eye was also a "link to the city's lively and long history with marijuana activism". The store was owned by cannabis and counterculture activist Jack Herer (1939–2010). Herer's son, Mark, who later owned the shop, described The Third Eye as "a hippie, Grateful Dead department store". Cannabis activist Russ Belville compared the establishment to a "Prohibition-era speakeasy". Images of Garcia and Herer were displayed to "keep watch over the shop".

== History ==
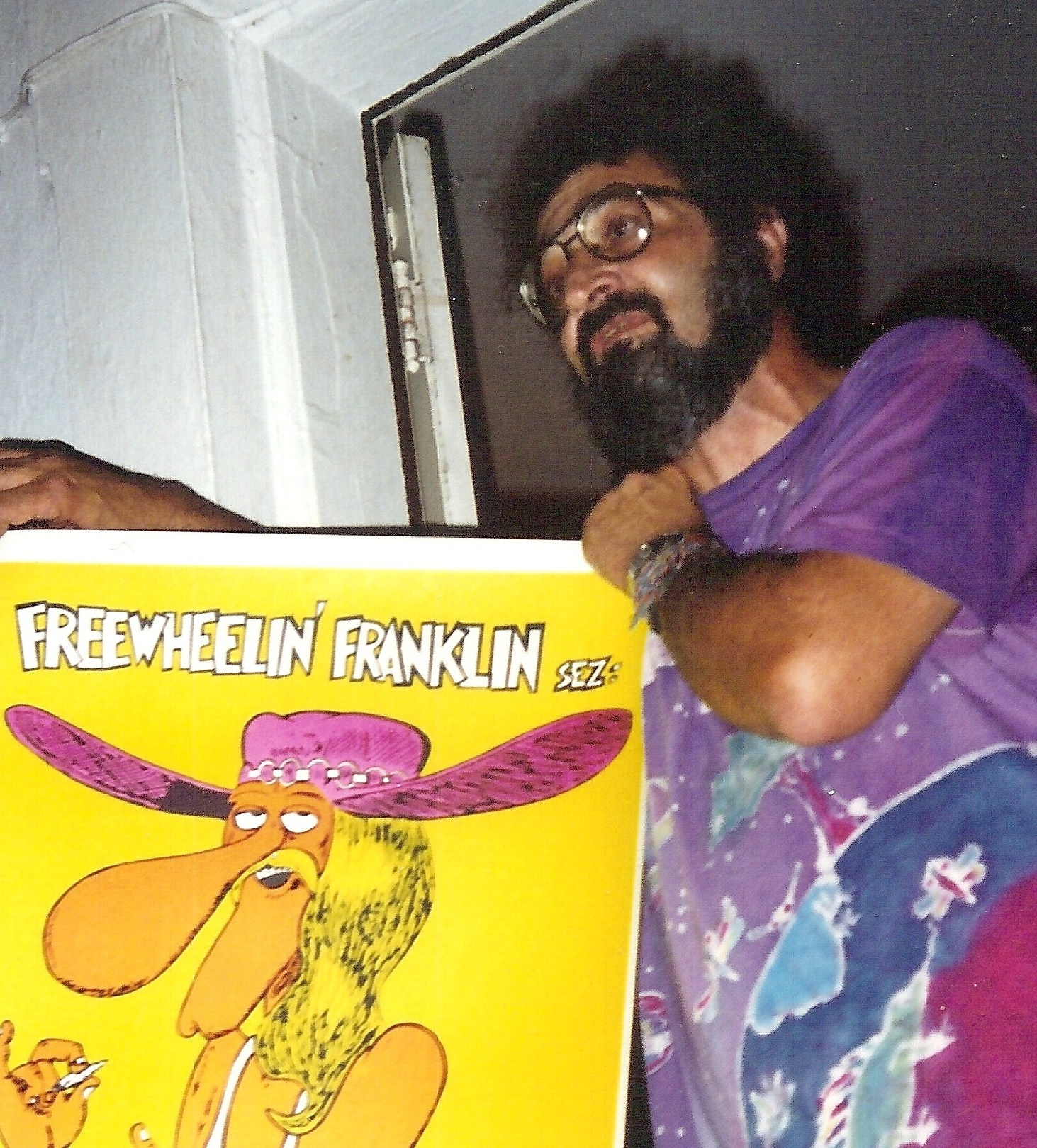
Cannabis activist Jack Herer (pictured in 1989) owned The Third Eye until his son, Mark, took over in 2001.

In the late 1980s, Jack Herer and his friend "Captain" Ed Adair purchased the "funky" building that would house The Third Eye, which formerly served as a two-story house, for around $100,000 (~$236,175 in 2024). The shop opened on July 1, 1987, and became known for its "eye-catching" exterior.

Madeline Martinez recalls drafting Oregon Ballot Measure 67—which modified state law to allow the cultivation, possession, and use of cannabis by doctor recommendation for patients with certain medical conditions, after passing in 1998—on the shop's second floor, alongside other cannabis activists. She has said, "A lot of the beginnings of the movement itself took place in that building."

In 2001, Mark Herer, took over as owner of The Third Eye. The store thrived during the 2000s, and employed as many as a dozen employees, each of whom received health insurance benefits. However, business declined sharply in 2016, and Herer estimates a loss of $500,000 in sales compared to 2015 because of competition from local cannabis stores and head shops, as well as online retail outlets.

In March 2017, The Third Eye announced its closing at the end of the month (March 31). Herer said the decision to close the shop was difficult, but "necessary as sales have steeply declined in recent years". In addition to lower sales, road construction, the development of the surrounding neighborhood, increasing health care costs, and "changing tastes and preferences of the modern cannabis consumer" were cited as reasons for the closure. Russ Belville called the closure "a natural evolution" of the cannabis movement which, according to The Oregonian, "in recent years has tried to shed its counterculture associations to appeal to a more mainstream audience". Belville said, "[The store is] just a relic from another era where those of us in the cannabis community were always outlaws."

The Third Eye hosted a farewell party during its last days to show its gratitude to customers. The business was one of Portland's oldest head shops before its closure, operating for nearly thirty years. According to Herer, the building which housed The Third Eye was sold to a commercial developer for $1 million cash, two hours after being listed. He anticipated the building's demolition, and told The Oregonian that he left the business $60,000 in debt.

== Reception ==
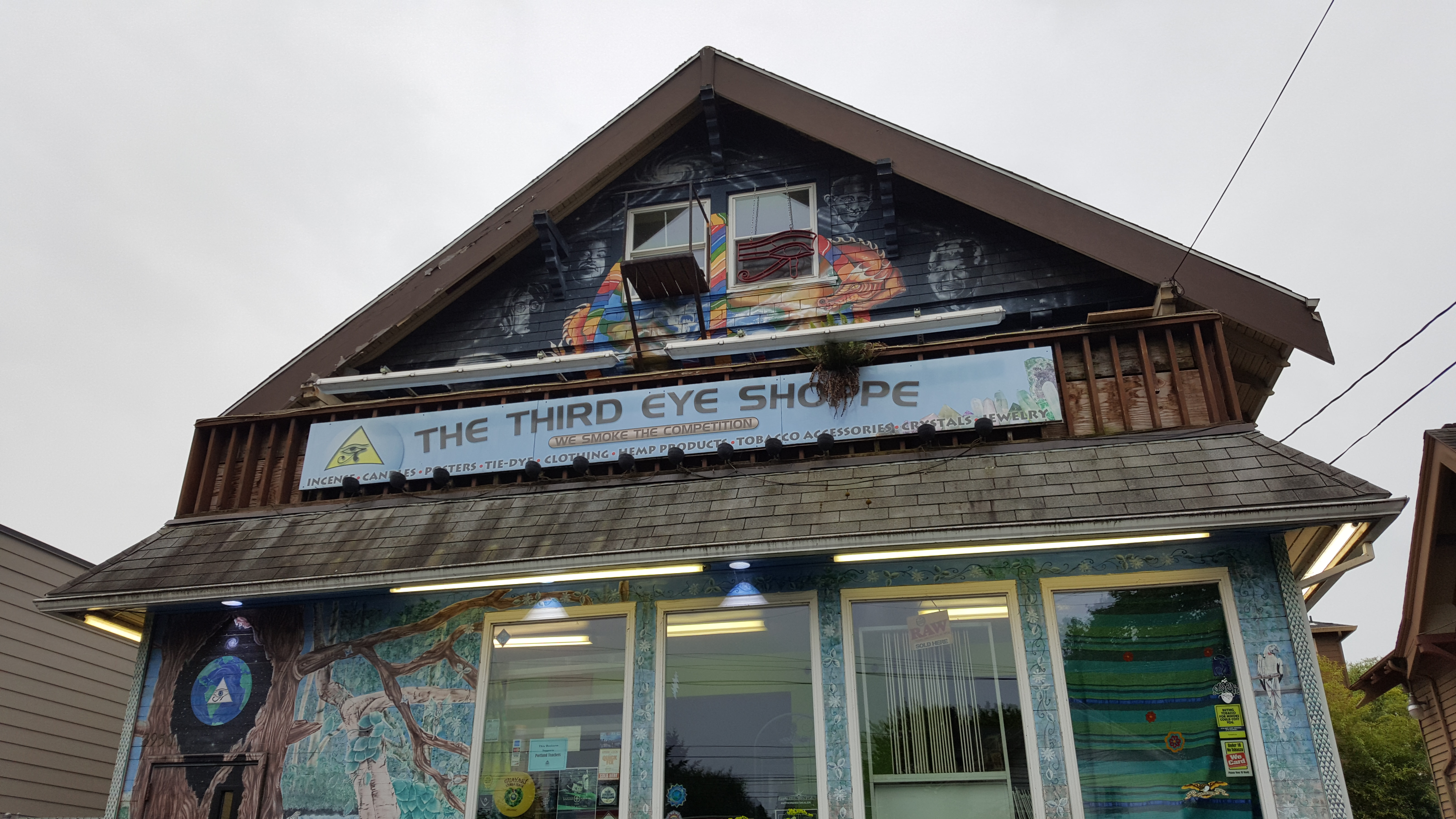
Front exterior, 2017

The Third Eye was associated with Portland's cannabis culture and recreational drug tourism. The shop was included in Pedal Bike Tours' popular Pot Tour, an educational and recreational tour of the city's marijuana-friendly sites, established in 2015. Zoe Wilder described the shop as a "funky counterculture boutique" in her Merry Jane article, five "stoner-friendly things to do" in Portland. The shop was included in Willamette Week's annual "Best of Portland" reader's poll several times. In 2005, The Third Eye won in the Best Head Shop category. In 2015 readers named it Best Head Shop, Best Vape Shop, and runner-up for Best Smoke Shop, and in 2016 Best Head Shop and runner-up for Best Smoke Shop.
