= Hemp Museum Gallery =

Museum located in Barcelona, Spain

Hash Marihuana & Hemp Museum
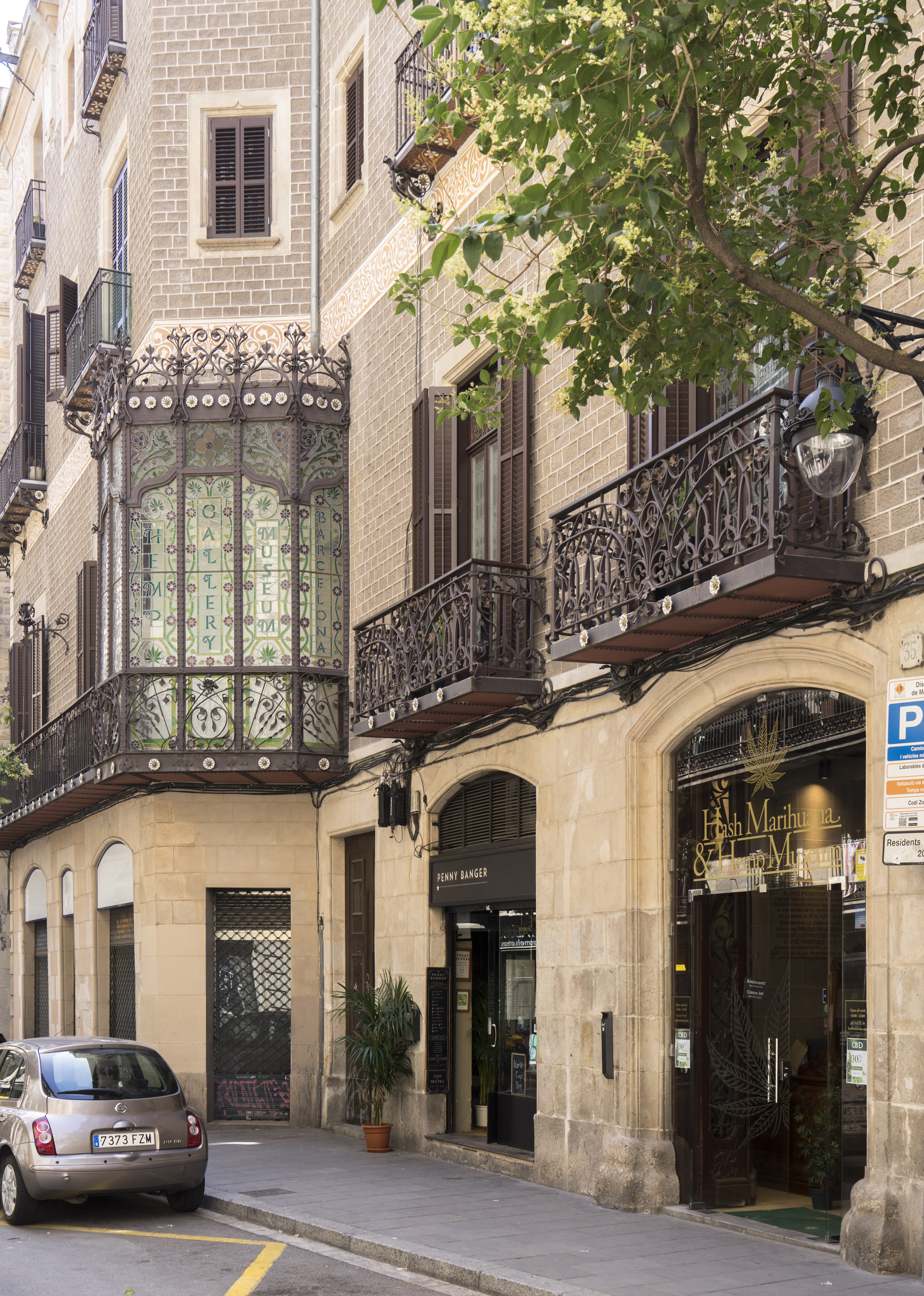
- Museum in 2018

- Location in the city center of Barcelona
- Established: 2012
- Location: Carrer Ample 35; Barcelona, Spain
- Coordinates: 41.2253°N 2.1049°E
- Collection size: 8.000 items
- Founder: Ben Dronkers
- Public transit access: Jaume I (Barcelona Metro), Drassanes (Barcelona Metro)
- Website: www.hashmuseum.com

The Hash Marihuana & Hemp Museum is a museum located in Barcelona, Spain dedicated to the culture of cannabis that opened on May 9, 2012.

== Building ==
The museum is located in the Palau Mornau, a palace built by the noble family of Santcliment in the sixteenth century and is located on the current number 35 of Carrer Ample in the Gothic Quarter of Barcelona. In the late eighteenth century, Josep Francesc Mornau, honorary war commissioner of the Royal Armies, bought the building and renovated it. In the early twentieth century, Lluís de Nadal i Artós, nephew of the then mayor of Barcelona, Josep Maria de Nadal i Vilardaga, inherited the palace and commissioned the Catalan Modernism architect Manuel Raspall to extend and renovate the building. His renovation works are highlighted by a façade coated with faux stones, wrought-iron balconies adorned with floral motifs and a stained glass bow window. Inside, the rooms were decorated, each with a different style in floors, ceilings, windows, walls and even furniture (now disappeared), all according to the eclectic taste of the early twentieth century. The museum has a total area of 482 square meters.

== History ==
In 1985, Ben Dronkers opened the Hash, Marihuana & Hemp Museum in Amsterdam, the world's first museum devoted to cannabis. Years later, he opened a second location in Barcelona. The museum shows the past, present and future of the cannabis plant, emphasizing that cannabis will be the "penicillin of the future" due to its use in the medical world.

== Collection ==
Its permanent collection consists of more than 8,000 cannabis related objects. From cultivation to consumption, from ancient rituals to modern medicine, all aspects of cannabis in human culture are represented in one way or another.

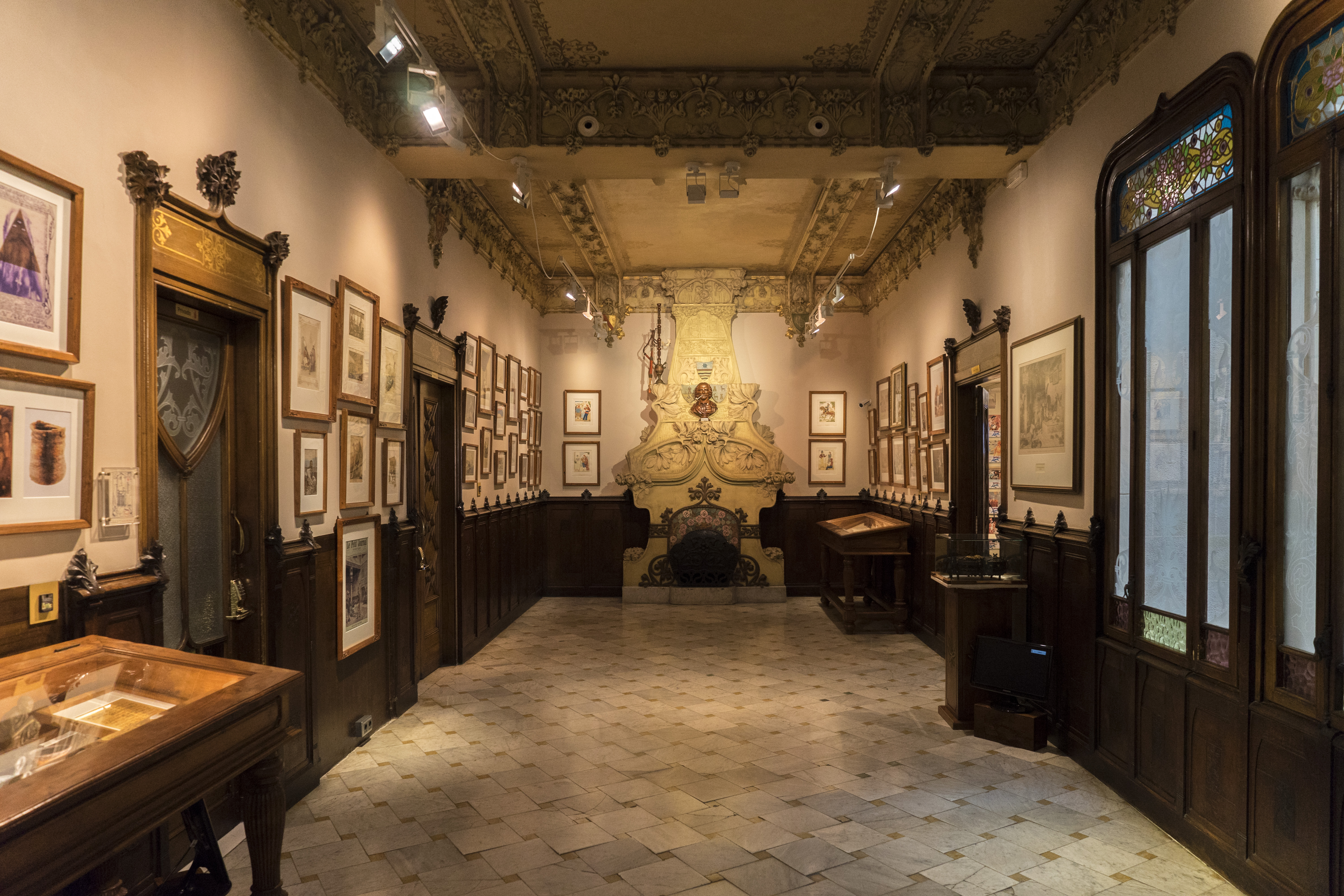
A room dedicated to history

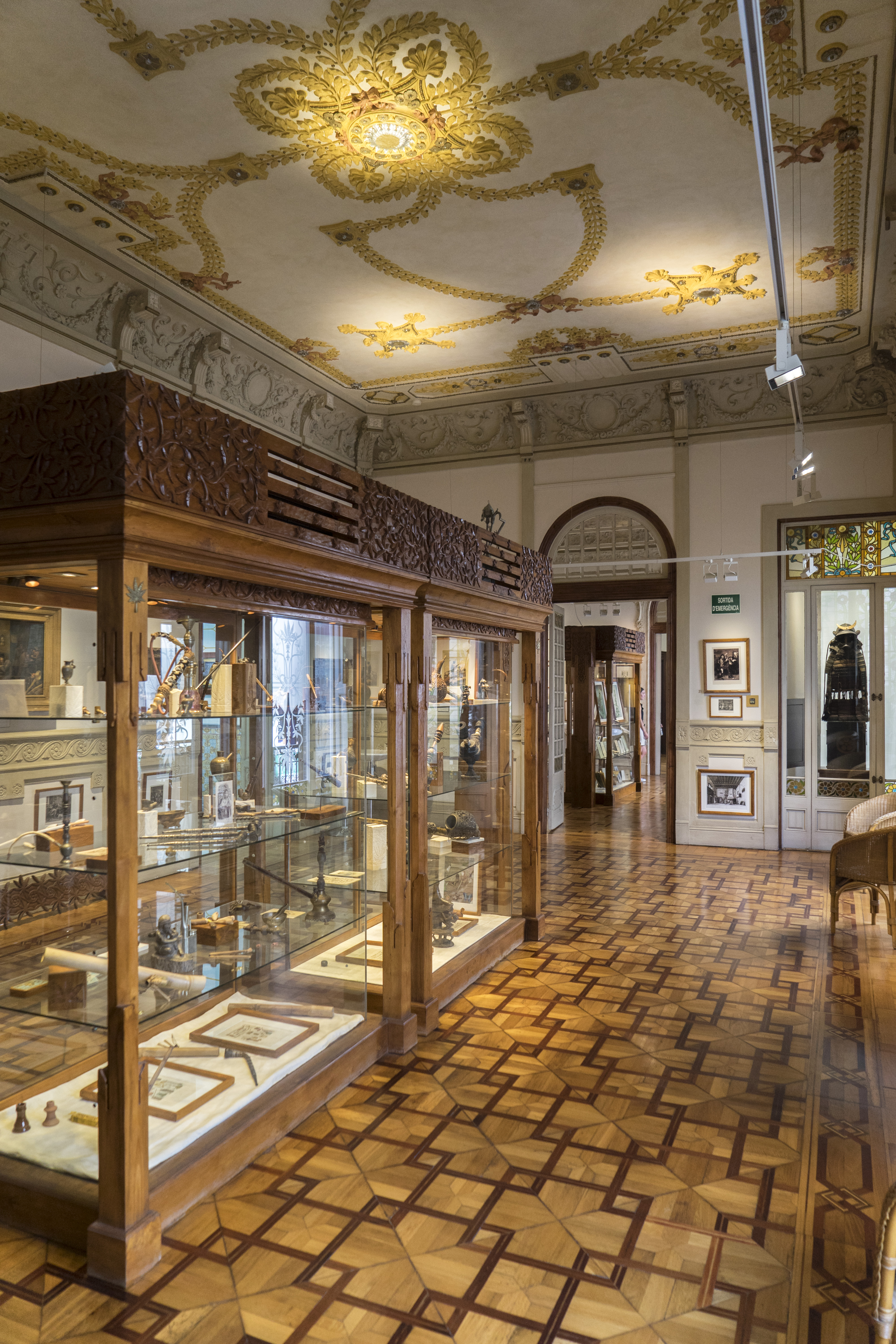
A room dedicated to consumption of cannabis

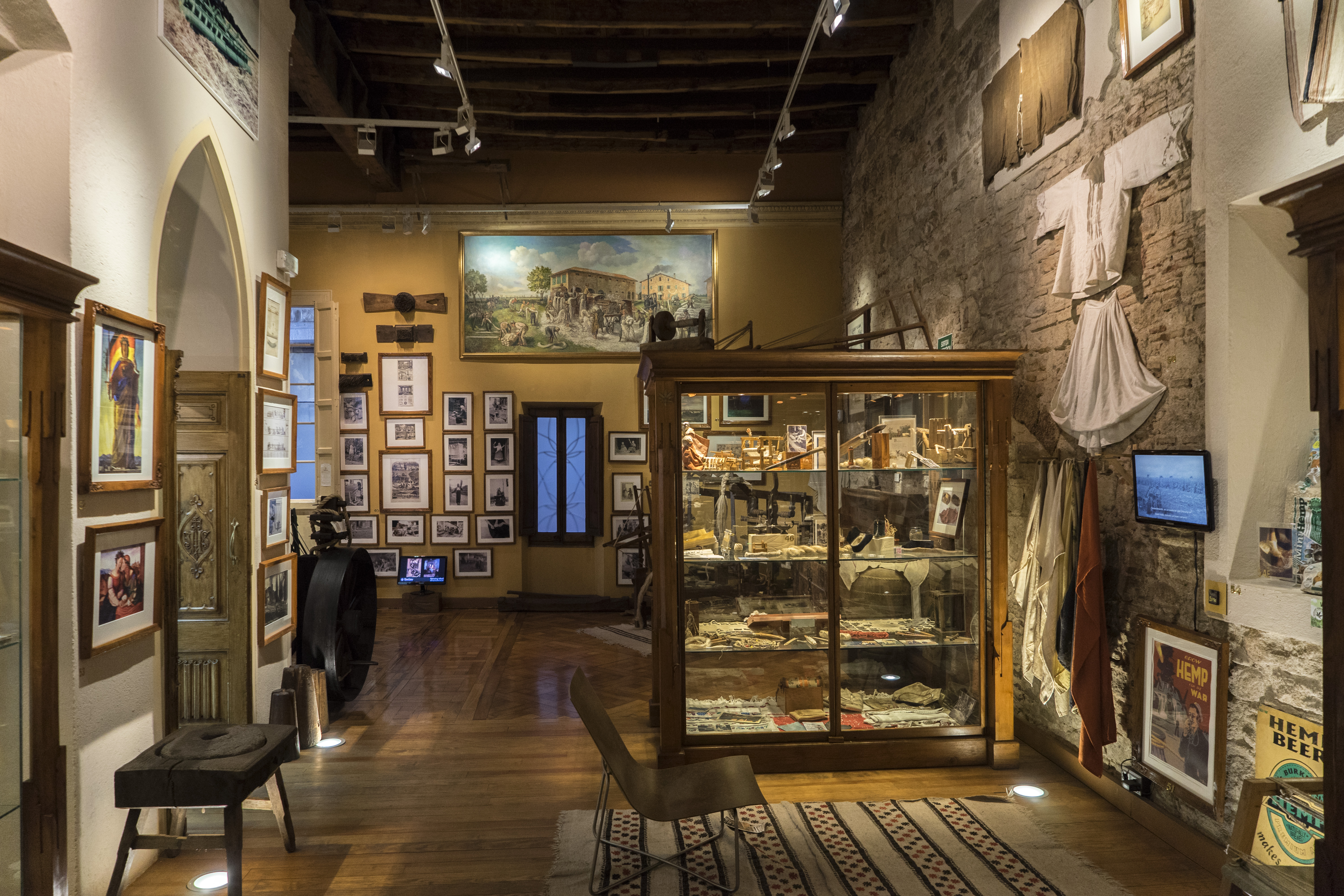
A room dedicated to products based on hemp

== See also ==
- Cannabis Museum
