= Sensi Seeds =

Dutch cannabis company

- Headquarters: Amsterdam, Netherlands
- Website: sensiseeds.com

Sensi Seeds or Sensi Seed Bank is a Dutch company based in Amsterdam which markets cannabis seeds.

== History ==
The company was founded in 1985, or 1998. Sensi Seeds is the world's largest cannabis seed producer with the world's largest cannabis seed bank.

Sensi Seeds was founded by Ben Dronkers, who also founded Amsterdam's Hash, Marihuana & Hemp Museum. The museum and the Sensi Seeds store within, were noted as Amsterdam destinations by travel guides by Let's Go, Lonely Planet, Rick Steves, and others.

According to a 2011 book, the company's success was acknowledged by knockoffs of strains developed and named by Sensi, who were unable to protect their brand names due to the legal landscape of the cannabis industry, after which time Sensi created a knockoff brand of its own products, White Label.

== See also ==
- Chris Conrad (author), who has been a Sensei Seeds consultant in the 1990s
- White-label product
