= Dockside Green =

Coordinates: 48.4294°N 123.3763°W

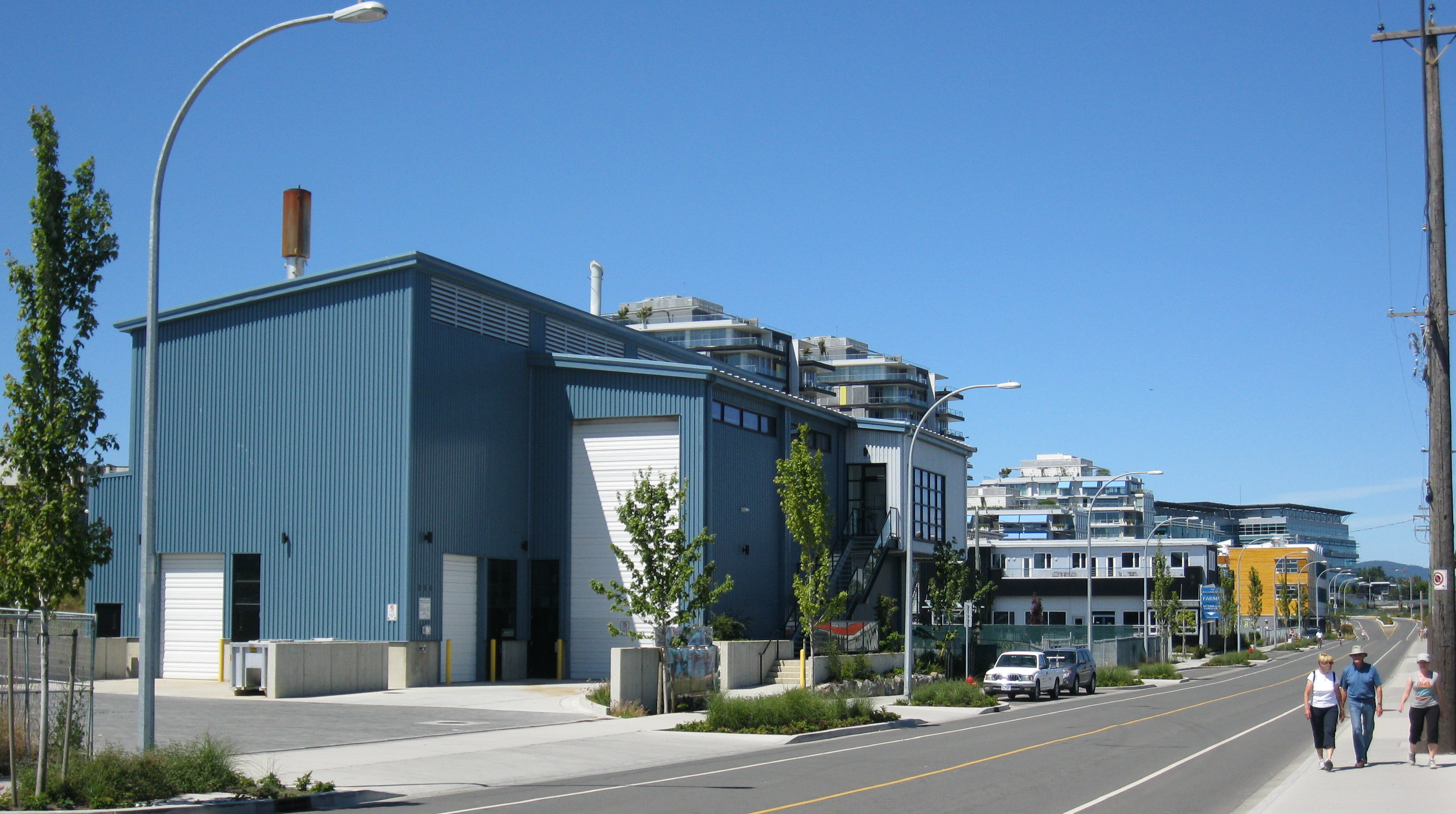
Biomass energy generator of Dockside Green

Dockside Green is a 1,300,000-square-foot (120,000 m^{2}) mixed-use community in Victoria, British Columbia, Canada owned by Vancity Credit Union and noted for its strict adherence to the principles of sustainable architecture or green building.

The development sits on 15 acres (6.1 ha) of Victoria's Inner Harbour, and was a brownfield site used by light industry for more than a century. Cleanup cost estimates were up to $12 million, from spilled petrochemicals, toxic heavy metal and the site's landfill (garbage and hazardous factory materials).

The project's first and second phases, completed by 2011, have achieved globally significant ratings for sustainability.

Dockside Green has a centralized biomass gasification plant that converts waste wood into a heating gas for hot water and heat, with peak period support from natural gas boilers. Biomass generation makes Dockside carbon neutral in greenhouse gas production, with some energy sales to surrounding communities. The development treats its sewage, using treated water for its toilets, irrigation, creeks and ponds system. High-efficiency shower heads, faucets, urinals, dishwashers and clothes-washing machines are standard.

Each Dockside accommodation can meter its own cold and hot water, space heating and electricity. Internet connection allows residents remote heating control when they are away. Dockside Green has a car sharing program, a planned dock for the harbour ferries, bicycle racks and showers for people commuting to the development's commercial areas. Bike access is linked into the region's Galloping Goose regional cycling trail.

Dockside Green is committed to using the "LEED for Neighborhood Development", similar to the LEED environmental rating system. Overall design aligns with the principles of New Urbanism, favouring mid-to-high density neighborhoods, a focus on community and a walkable range for most of its residents' daily needs. As a "mixed use" community Dockside hopes for a mix of suites, a thriving retail and office culture and residents of varying ages, ethnicity and socio-economic levels. The development's team has worked with the municipality of Victoria on a Housing Affordability Strategy to create "affordable housing" (or families in the $30,000 to $60,000 income range).

Dockside Green stands on land originally home to the First Nations Songhees people. Developers have included them in on-site celebrations and by including First Nations art and history throughout the site.

Dockside has also supported local and Canadian business wherever possible: innovative technology companies involved from British Columbia companies include Nexterra (the biomass gasification plant) and Sol-Air Systems (ultraviolet air decontamination for the sewage facility), and the Canadian company Zenon (sewage treatment process).

On October 15, 2017, it was announced that Bosa Development is buying the Dockside Green development from Vancity. The sale for the mixed-use residential and commercial real estate development closes on Dec. 15. Bosa Development will continue to build the project to Dockside's LEED-ND (leadership in energy and environmental design – neighbourhood development) standards.
