= Cannabist Kansai =

Cannabis advocacy group in Japan

Cannabist Kansai (Japanese: カンナビスト関西) is a cannabis advocacy group formed in Japan in 1999. They organize an annual Marijuana March in Osaka.
