= Gator's Dockside =

American restaurant chain located in Florida

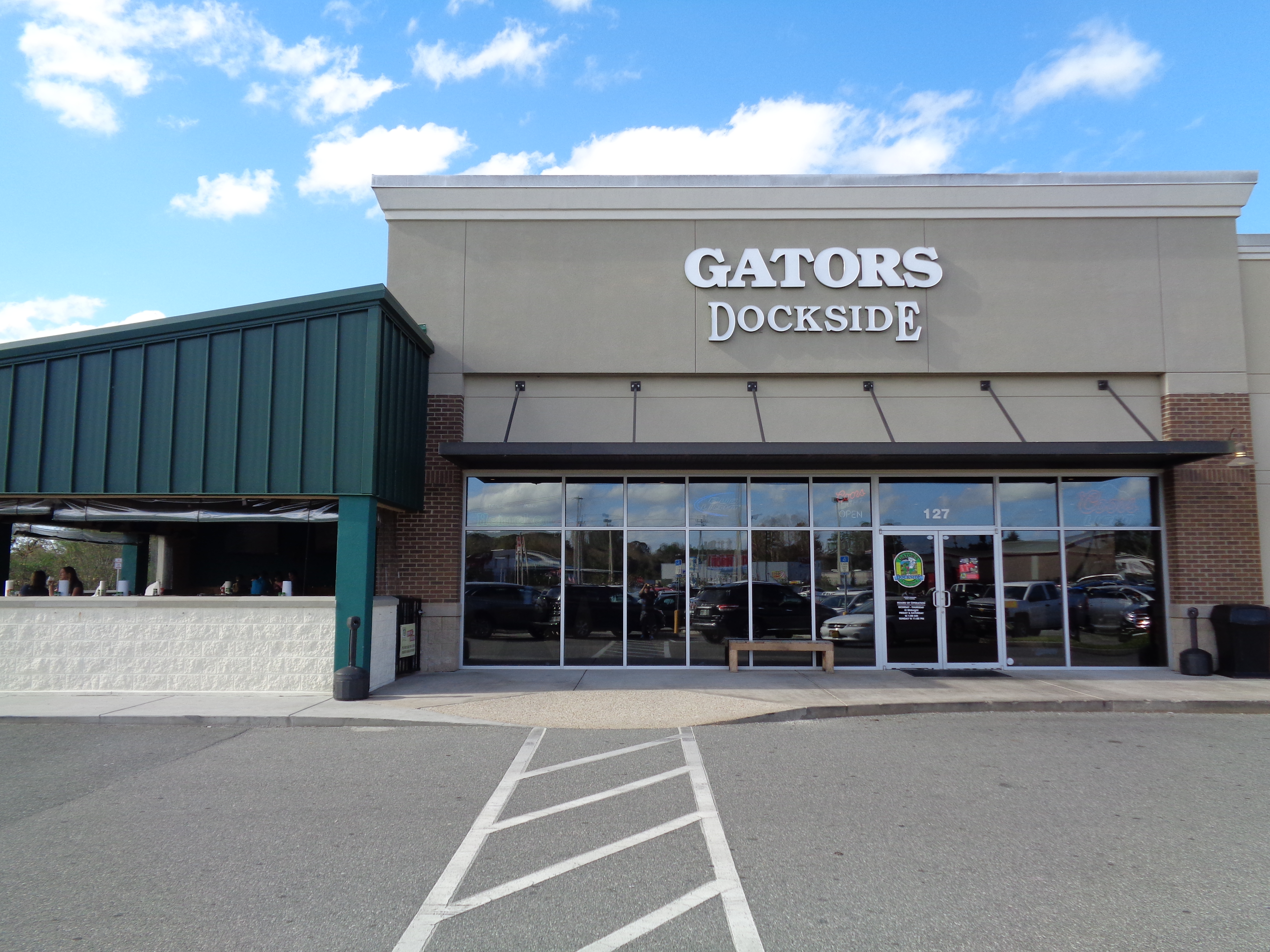
A Gator's Dockside location pictured in 2015

Gator's Dockside is a casual restaurant and sports bar chain with locations found in central and northeastern Florida. The restaurant was started by brothers Tony and Paul Cipparone and friend John Foerst in Jacksonville, in May 1991. The chain serves mainly Americana fare, with offerings similar to what is found at nationwide chains such as Applebee's and TGI Fridays, but with some localized features including seafood and fried alligator tail.
