= Dockside Cannabis Museum =

Museum in Seattle

The Dockside Cannabis Museum
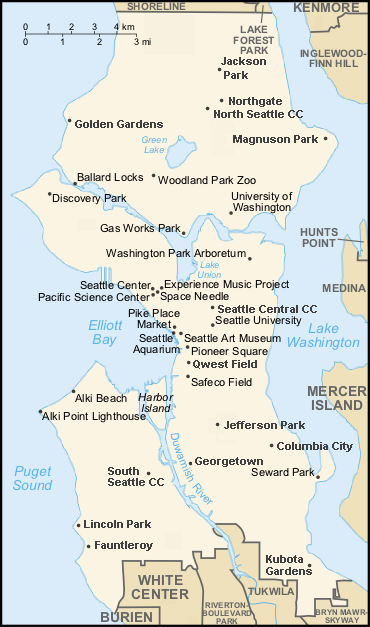
- Location within Seattle
- Location: 1728 4th Ave South, Seattle
- Coordinates: 47°35′14″N 122°19′43″W
- Type: History of cannabis and its use

The Dockside Cannabis Museum is a museum dedicated to cannabis in Seattle, Washington state, United States. It displays historical packaging from prior to the U.S. prohibition of cannabis, and photography. The museum is inside a cannabis store in the city's SODO neighborhood.
