= Cannabis Control Law =

Japanese legislation regulating cannabis

The Cannabis Control Law (大麻取締法, Taima torishimari hō) of Japan, aka 1948 Law No. 124, is the national law of Japan concerning cannabis possession, cultivation, and transfer.

== Enforcement target ==
According to Article 1 of the same Act, the term "hemp" in this Act means "hemp grass (Cannabis Sativa el) and its products, resins are included therein, mature stems and seeds and their products are excluded It is stipulated. It is because hemp seed is used for shichimi because it is not regulated.

Article 2 of the same law is a provision on handlers of cannabis and Article 3 prohibits production, distribution, "use for research" other than cannabis handlers.

Article 4, paragraph 1, item 2 of the law prohibits the use and application of medicines manufactured from "marijuana" to any person. This point is different from the fact that morphine designated as a drug in the drug and cosmetic drug regulation is approved for medical use only, as methamphetamine designated as a stimulant in the Stimulant Drug Control Law is approved.

Article 4, paragraph 1, item 4 of the same law prohibits cannabis advertising except in specific cases.

However, unlike other drug control laws, "possession and use" together will be subject to control, whereas the Cannabis Control Law can not punish for "cannabis use only". This is because hemp is growing in nature and there is a possibility that hemp may be aspirated without knowing it.

== Enactment and amendment of law ==
At the First International Opium Convention held in 1912, a resolution was made prohibiting the abuse of opium, morphine and cocaine, but the ratification of the First World War had extended to 1919.

In this case, it was said that it was desirable for India cannabis to be researched from a scientific standpoint.

Then, in 1925 (Taisho 14), in the Second Opium Convention, the international Regulation of cannabis began as "India cannabis", with the provision of restrictions on the use of India cannabis preparations for medical and academic purposes only, and regulations on import and export and illegal trade. In Japan, in 1930 (Showa 5), "Drug Control Regulations (Interior Ordinance 17)" was enacted, and cannabis was designated as a drug.

The provisions of those days were related to the manufacture of cannabis (notification to the Interior Minister), import and export and transfer procedures, etc.

After that, the drug control rule was integrated into the Pharmaceutical Affairs Act of enactment in 1943, but cannabis was still subject to drug designation and was regulated. After World War II, the crackdown on cannabis "drug raw plant cultivation, drug production" was enacted as a Potsdam ordinance based on the so-called Potsdam Emergency Decree (Imperial Decree No. 542, 1945, "Orders to be Issued in Consequence of the Acceptance of the Potsdam Declaration").

It was started by Import and export Prohibition (No. 46 of the Ministry of Health and Welfare), and hemp was designated as a narcotic and the cultivation of hemp grass was completely prohibited. Then, also, as the Ministry of the Potsdam Ordinance "Cannabis Regulation (Welfare and Agriculture Ordinance No. 1 of Showa 22)" has been enacted to regulate the cannabis independent from the drug, allowing the cultivation of hemp by permission.

The import, export, possession, and the sale of hemp were restricted. In 1948 (Showa 23), the drug control law that unified the opium method (Law No. 123 in 1947) was enacted, hemp cultivation is mainly due to differences between farmers and morphine, which are mainly related to medical institutions, apart from the drug control law. The Cannabis Control Law was newly enacted and the rules for cannabis control were abolished. In the Cannabis Control Law, the treatment of cannabis was limited only to academic research and collection of textiles and seeds, and the handling of cannabis was a license system.

In addition, we prohibit the possession, cultivation, import and export of cannabis by unlicensed, and stipulate the penalty. The cannabis Control Law has been amended dozens of times. In 1953, the definition of cannabis was revised as "large hemp and its products," and hemp grass seeds were excluded from the regulations. In 1963, a legal sentence for penalties was raised in the amendment.

In 1990, the amendment was the provision of weighted punishment for profit-making, such as cultivation, import, export, transfer, acquisition, possession, etc. and the newly established crime, intermediation, and other crimes for the attempted crimes, cultivation, import and export. In recent years, the international public opinion that the regulation should be strengthened because of the increasing number of international illicit transactions such as narcotics, in 1984, the United Nations General Assembly began a study of the United Nations Convention Against Illicit Traffic in Narcotic Drugs and Psychotropic Substances.

It was adopted in Vienna, 1988. In response to this Treaty, the amendment of the drug-related law, including the Cannabis Control Law, was made in 1991. In this, expansion of the range of punishment of the crime of provision of funds, expansion of the scope of confiscation to vehicles, etc. that were used for the transportation of cannabis, and the establishment of the rules for the deportation.
