= Hash, Marihuana & Hemp Museum =

Museum in Amsterdam, Netherlands

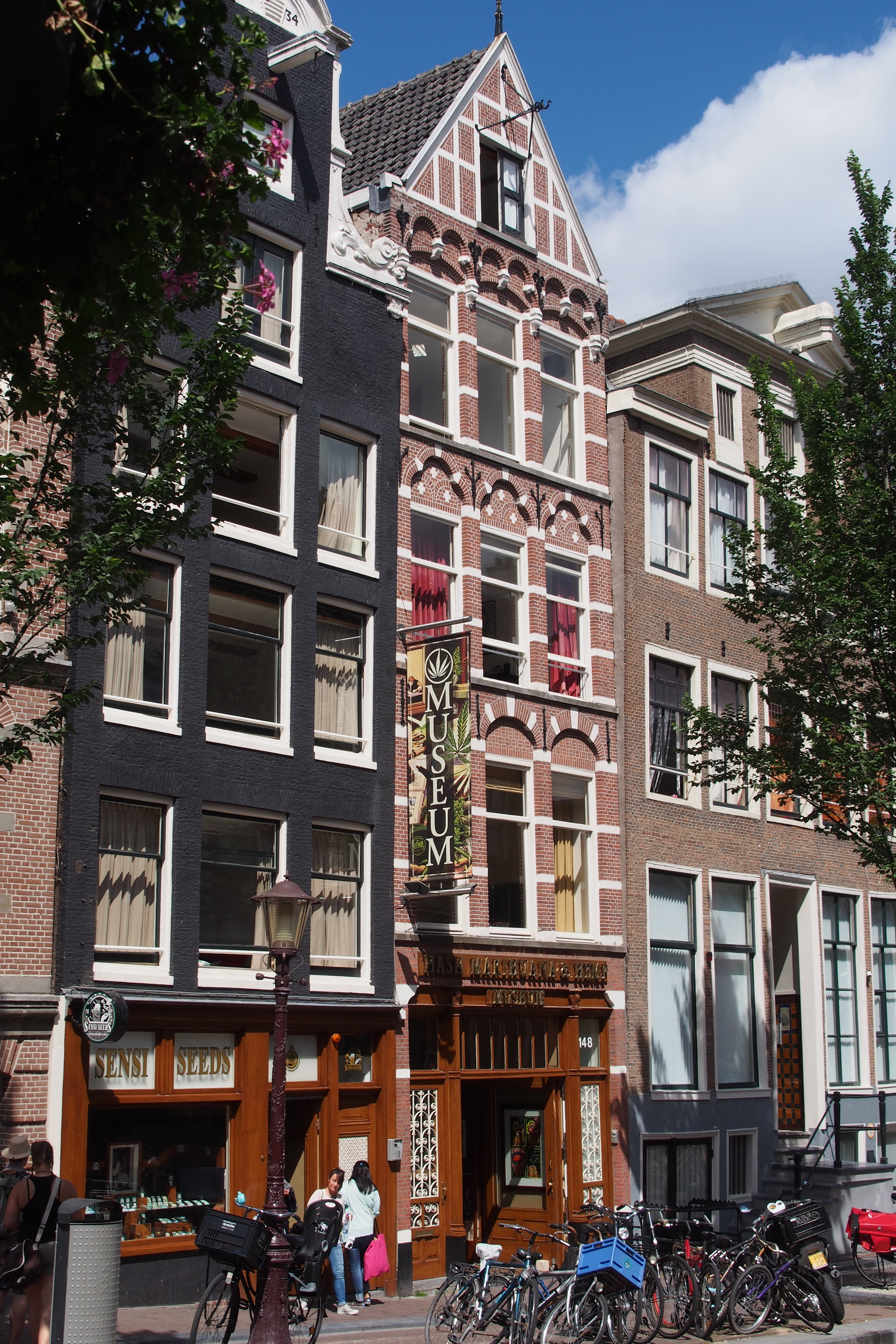
- The museum's exterior in 2013

- Location in the city center of Amsterdam
- Established: 1985
- Location: Oudezijds Achterburgwal 148; Amsterdam, Netherlands
- Coordinates: 52.3722°N 4.8974°E
- Founder: Ben Dronkers
- Website: www.hashmuseum.com

The Hash, Marihuana & Hemp Museum is a museum located in De Wallen, Amsterdam, Netherlands. According to the museum, more than two million visitors have visited the exhibition since it opened in 1985. Dedicated to cannabis and its many uses, the museum offers visitors information about the historical and modern uses of cannabis for medicinal, spiritual and cultural purposes. The museum also focuses on how hemp can be used for agricultural and industrial purposes, even including clothing accessories and cosmetic products made from hemp fiber. In 2012 the museum opened a second location in Barcelona, the Hash Marihuana Cáñamo & Hemp Museum.

The Hash, Marihuana & Hemp Museum is located at Oudezijds Achterburgwal 148, open daily, and costs €9 ($11.50) per adult (children under 13 are free when accompanied by an adult).

== Exhibits ==
The museum includes a live cannabis garden in various stages of growth, pipe and roach clip collections, an 1836 Dutch Bible made of hemp, and many other accessories made from the industrial crop. The museum also contains artwork, including David Teniers the Younger's painting, Hemp-Smoking Peasants in a Smoke House (1660), and one of the fake I.D's of the famous cannabis smuggler Howard Marks.

== Reception ==
The Hash Marihuana & Hemp Museum is often cited in travel books as a destination to visit in Amsterdam due to the unique drug policy of cannabis in the Netherlands. Time Out Amsterdam asserted "cannabis connoisseurs will lose themselves ogling larger than life pictures of perfect plants and gleaming balls of hash in this museum in the Red Light District. But this shrine to skunk is not only for smokers and tokers. Straighter-laced visitors will be entertained by the long and illustrious history of the plant". Author Rick Steves wrote that the museum was informative, but "small and somewhat overpriced, educational but not very entertaining".

== See also ==
- List of museums in Amsterdam
- Cannabis Museum
