= The Predicament =

2025 novel by William Boyd

- Hardback edition
- Author: William Boyd
- Publisher: Viking Penguin
- Publication date: 2025 (hardback); 2026 (paperback)
- Pages: 272
- ISBN: 9780241761137
- Preceded by: Gabriel's Moon (2024)
- Followed by: Cold Sunset (2026)

The Predicament is the nineteenth novel by British author William Boyd, published in 2025, by Atlantic Crime in the United States and Viking Penguin in the United Kingdom. It is the second installment in the Gabriel Dax trilogy, following Gabriel's Moon (2024). The novel continues the story of Dax, a travel writer who becomes entangled in Cold War espionage. It is the fifth Boyd novel to heavily feature espionage, following; Restless (2006), Waiting for Sunrise (2012), Solo (2013) his James Bond continuation novel and Gabriel's Moon.

== Plot ==
Set in 1963, the novel follows Gabriel Dax, a travel writer living in Sussex, who is drawn back into espionage by his MI6 handler and former lover, Faith Green. Dax is sent to Guatemala under the pretense of covering a presidential election. There, he witnesses the assassination of Padre Tiago, a leftist candidate whose reformist agenda threatens the interests of the United Fruit Company and the CIA. The killing plunges Dax into a web of political intrigue and covert operations.

After narrowly escaping Guatemala, Dax travels to Berlin, where tensions are high ahead of U.S. President John F. Kennedy’s visit. Dax uncovers intelligence suggesting a plot to assassinate Kennedy during his “Ich bin ein Berliner” speech. As he navigates the divided city, Dax is forced to confront the duplicity of his allies and the possibility that he is being manipulated by both British and Soviet intelligence.

The novel explores Dax’s internal conflict as he struggles with his role as a spy and his desire to return to a quiet literary life. His relationship with Faith Green becomes increasingly strained, and he is drawn into a dangerous game of double agency. The story culminates in an epilogue dated November 22, 1963, the day of Kennedy’s assassination in Dallas, leaving the reader to consider the implications of Dax’s discoveries and the broader geopolitical consequences.

== Trilogy ==
In interviews, Boyd has discussed his fascination with the espionage genre and its capacity to explore complex human behaviours. He remarked, “I feel that the world of espionage is actually the human condition writ large. We've all betrayed people. We've all lied to people.” Boyd revealed in 2024 that Gabriel’s Moon was the first in a planned trilogy featuring Gabriel Dax, indicating his intention to further explore the character's unwitting involvement in the espionage landscape. The second Dax book, The Predicament, was published in 2025.

== Reception ==
Reviews have been generally positive commenting on Boyd's interesting protagonist and engaging, fast-paced narrative.

Kirkus described the novel as “a thriller that’s always in motion,” noting Boyd’s use of espionage tropes and a protagonist who is “comically flawed” and “self-delusional concluding that the book is "always in motion but, unlike its hero, always knows where it's going."

Stevie Davies in The Literary Review described the novel as "both a jeu d’esprit and a psychological case study in which Gabriel, traumatised by a loss in childhood, ricochets between his ‘real’ and ‘false’ selves, seeking stability then abandoning it"

Hephzibah Anderson in The Observer commented that " if the book fails to live up to the genre’s highest aspirations, this is nevertheless stylish stuff, and Dax’s intermittent naivety feels compellingly credible."
