= The Dream Lover (short story collection) =

2008 collection of short stories by William Boyd

- Cover of UK paperback edition
- Author: William Boyd
- Publisher: Bloomsbury Publishing
- Publication date: 1 March 2008
- Pages: 355
- ISBN: 9780747592297

The Dream Lover: Short Stories is a collection of short stories by the Scottish writer William Boyd that were written at the start of Boyd's career. It was published in 2008 by Bloomsbury. The Dream Lover combines two previous books of short stories: On the Yankee Station and The Destiny of Nathalie 'X'.

== Reception ==
Writing in the Financial Times, Jerome de Groote said that Boyd's book "demonstrates both the broad range of his imagination and the development of his taut prose style".

In a review for The Observer, Vanessa Thorpe said: "Boyd believes the short form has been key to his evolution as a writer. He says in his introduction to this selection, drawn from across his career, that these brief escapades have allowed him to vary his style and technique... Passive or accidental observers, [including] the title story of the collection, 'Dream Lover', are crucial to what Boyd does. It is the simple, heartfelt stories which are the most vivid. All of them though, even the ones that crawl inside the heads of some quite creepy folk, such as 'My Girl in Skin-Tight Jeans' or 'Not Yet, Jayette', are compelling".

Laurence Phelan, reviewing the book for The Independent on Sunday, said: "If there can be said to be a common thread, it's nothing more than the infinite vagaries of the human heart and the complexities of the mind... All that links them is their erudition, refined prose-style and precisely honed form".
