= The Argument =

The Argument may refer to:

- The Argument (Fugazi album), 2001
- The Argument (Grant Hart album), 2013
- The Argument (film), a 2020 American film
- The Argument (2016 play), by William Boyd
- The Argument (2005 play), by Alexandra Gersten-Vassilaros
- The Argument (With Annotations), a 2017 Canadian-British short film
- The Argument, a song by GFOTY from Call Him A Doctor
- The Argument (magazine), an online news and investigative journalism magazine

== See also ==
- Argument (disambiguation)
