= Ice Cream Wars =

Ice Cream Wars and similar terms may refer to:

- Glasgow ice cream wars, turf war between criminal gangs
- "The Ice Cream Wars", of My Little Pony; see My Little Pony (TV series) § Episodes (Season 2, Episode 60)
- An Ice-Cream War, 1982 William Boyd novel, set in East Africa in World War I
