= Cold Sunset =

2026 novel by William Boyd

- Cover of hardback edition
- Author: William Boyd
- Publisher: Viking Penguin
- Publication date: 2026 (hardback); 2027 (paperback)
- Pages: 272
- ISBN: 978-0-241-76109-0
- Preceded by: The Predicament (2024)

Cold Sunset is the twentieth novel by British author William Boyd. It was published in November 2026 by Viking Penguin in the United Kingdom, and in September 2026 by Atlantic Crime in the United States. It is the third and concluding novel in Boyd's Gabriel Dax trilogy, following Gabriel's Moon (2024) and The Predicament (2025). The novel again centres on Gabriel Dax, a travel writer whose work provides cover for occasional assignments in the clandestine world of Cold War espionage.

== Plot ==
In 1964, travel writer Gabriel Dax is drawn back into intelligence work when his MI6 handler, Faith Green, asks him to look into suspicions surrounding two former wartime intelligence figures. What begins as a discreet inquiry suggests that an unresolved act of betrayal may still have consequences within British intelligence.

Gabriel is subsequently sent to Moscow on an apparently straightforward mission involving Kit Caldwell, a celebrated British defector. As the assignment becomes more dangerous, he is forced to navigate uncertain loyalties and question how far he can trust both those around him and his own judgement.

== Series ==
The novel completes a trilogy that began with Gabriel’s Moon (2024) and continued with The Predicament (2025). Across the series, Gabriel is drawn progressively deeper into intelligence work while maintaining his public career as a travel writer. His relationship with Faith Green, an enigmatic intelligence officer, and his appointments and discussions with a psychotherapist, provide a continuing thread through the three novels.

== Reception ==
The novel received broadly positive reviews, although some critics expressed reservations about its familiar genre conventions and unresolved character threads.

Writing in The Independent, Geordie Greig gave the book a 4 (out of 5) review praising Boyd's ability to combine moral seriousness with entertainment, placing the novel between Eric Ambler’s concern with betrayal and compromised loyalties and Ian Fleming's taste for glamour, danger and the suspension of ordinary rules. Greig also identified Gabriel's apparent ordinariness, curiosity and powers of observation as central to his appeal, and described the movement from California to Moscow as one of the novel's chief pleasures.

Kirkus called the novel an enjoyable seriocomic treatment of the Cold War spy world, praising Boyd's chronological approach for producing a smooth, brisk narrative filled with surprising turns and distinctive personalities; the review concluded that the book left the reader hoping for another instalment.

In The Spectator, Leaf Arbuthnot commended the pace, abundance of incident and Boyd's attention to period clothes, cars and other material detail. She found particular pleasure in Gabriel's competence as an operative and said that the novel remained gripping, while suggesting that some twists were predictable and some genre conventions overfamiliar.

Chris Connor of Crime Fiction Lover praised Boyd's evocation of the early 1960s, particularly the atmosphere of paranoia surrounding moles and double agents, and considered the shifting relationship between Gabriel and Faith to be at the heart of the series. Connor also highlighted the globe-spanning narrative and the way Gabriel's travel writing remains both a credible cover and a source of character detail.
