= Martyn Stanbridge =

English actor

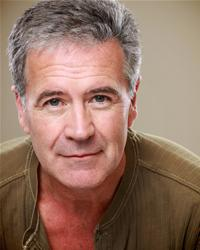
- Born: Martyn Stanbridge; 4 May 1957 (age 69); United Kingdom
- Occupation: Actor
- Years active: 1980 – present

Martyn Stanbridge (born 4 May 1957) is an English actor.

Stanbridge studied at Trent College, then Drama Centre London. His work includes television and theatre, with appearances in the UK and internationally. He has performed at many of the regional theatres in the UK, the West End and Royal National Theatre. He has performed in a wide range of roles in a wide range of plays. Playwrights include William Shakespeare, Thomas Otway, Neil Simon, Dion Boucicault, Alan Ayckbourn, Ray Cooney, Anton Chekhov, Noël Coward and Agatha Christie.

His first lead role in a television film was in Good and Bad at Games by screenwriter and novelist William Boyd.

== Selected credits ==
=== Television ===
- EastEnders (TV series) Clifford (2007)
- Doctors (TV series) Luke Hepworth in Stealing Booty (2002)
- McLibel! (TV documentary film) John Hawkes (1997)
- Doctor Finlay (TV series) Graham Robertson in Still Waters, (as 'Martin Stanbridge') (1996)
- The Bill (TV series) Dr. Hackman (1995)
- The Good Guys (TV series) Clive Aston (1992)
- Partners, Lovers & Spies (NBC USA Pilot) Ross Carlyle (1988)
- Hedgehog Wedding (TV Drama) Dominic (1987)
- Murrow (TV Film) Lancaster Pilot (1986)
- The Day After the Fair (TV Film) Charles (1986)
- A Pocket Full of Rye (TV Film) Vivian Dubois (1985)

=== Theatre ===
- Witness for the Prosecution, Vienna's English Theatre, Director Philip Dart. (2014)
- The Odd Couple, Mill at Sonning, Director Anthony Valentine. (2009)
- Dangerous Obsession, UK Tour, Director Alan Cohen. (2006)
- Rebecca, UK Tour, Director Patrick Mason. (2005)
- The Graduate, UK Tour, Director Tamara Harvey. (2003)
- Brief Encounter, Theatre Royal Windsor, Director Roger Redfarn. (2000)
- Don't Dress for Dinner, Royal & Derngate, Director Chris Dunham. (1999)
- The Verge, Orange Tree Theatre, Director Auriol Smith. (1996)
- The Shaughraun, Abbey Theatre, Dublin, Director Garry Hynes. (1990)
- The Vortex, Glasgow Citizens Theatre and Garrick Theatre, Director Philip Prowse. (1988)
- Three Sisters, Greenwich Theatre, Director Elijah Moshinsky. (1986)
- Salonika, Liverpool Playhouse, Director Les Waters. (1985)
- Venice Preserv'd, Royal National Theatre, Director Peter Gill. (1984)
- Berenice, Lyric Theatre Hammersmith, Director Christopher Fettes. (1982)
- Chips with Everything, Birmingham Repertory Theatre, Director Peter Farago. (1980)
- Mephisto, Oxford Playhouse, Director Gordon McDougall. (1980)
