= Armadillo (serial) =

- Promotional poster
- Genre: Drama
- Based on: Armadillo by William Boyd
- Screenplay by: William Boyd
- Directed by: Howard Davies
- Starring: James Frain
- Composer: Richard Hartley
- Countries of origin: United Kingdom; United States
- Original language: English
- No. of series: 1
- No. of episodes: 3

Production
- Executive producers: Jane Tranter (BBC); Delia Fine (A&E)
- Producer: Sue Birtwistle
- Cinematography: James Welland
- Editor: Kevin Lester
- Running time: 180 minutes
- Production companies: BBC; A+E Networks

Original release
- Network: BBC One
- Release: 16 September – 30 September 2001
- Network: A&E
- Release: 5 August 2002

Armadillo is a 2001 three-part television drama starring James Frain, directed by Howard Davies and based on William Boyd's 1998 novel of the same name. Boyd also serves as the screenwriter for the show.

== Cast ==
- James Frain as Lorimer Black
- Moses Rockman as James
- Tom Hiddleston as Toby Sherrifmuir
- Catherine McCormack as Flavia Malinverno
- Stephen Rea as Hogg
- Hugh Bonneville as Torquil Helvoir Jayne
- James Fox as Sir Simon Sherrifmuir
- Neil Pearson as Rintoul

== Production ==
The film was shot in London.

== Release ==
The series was originally telecast as a three-part television film by BBC beginning 16 September 2001 on BBC One, it was also aired in a single, three-hour television film by American network A+E on 5 August 2002.
