= Bamboo (book) =

Collection of non-fiction works by William Boyd

- First edition (UK)
- Author: William Boyd
- Publisher: Hamish Hamilton
- Publication date: 2005 in the United Kingdom
- Pages: 650

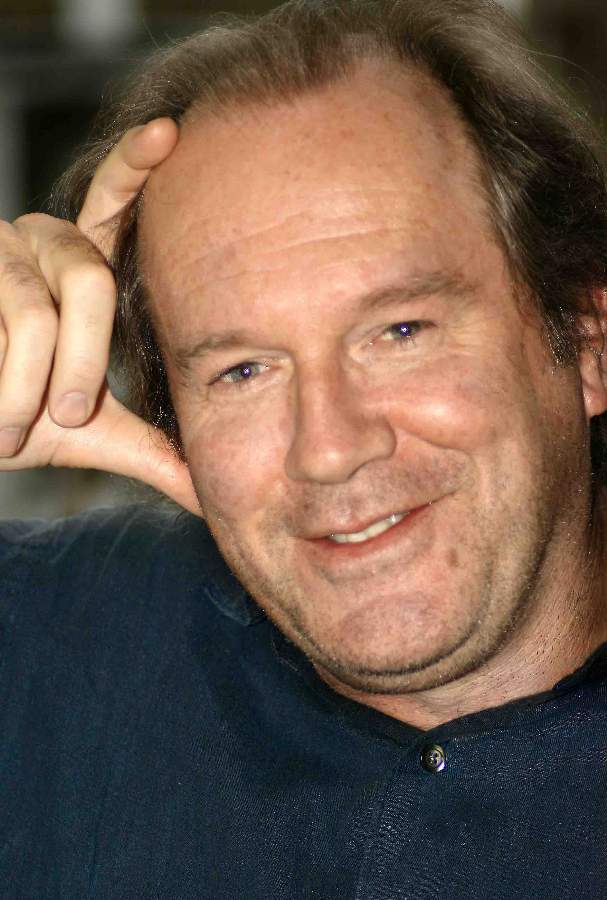
Boyd in 2009

Bamboo is a collection of non-fiction works by the Scottish writer William Boyd. It was published in the United Kingdom in 2005 by Hamish Hamilton. In the United States, a paperback version was published by Bloomsbury USA in 2007 as Bamboo: Essays and Criticism.

James Urquhart, for The Independent, said: "Much of it is good... Boyd's art criticism is lucid, well-constructed and refreshing, possessing the unusual quality of making painters legible and interesting on the page... Perhaps his professionalism as a writer combines with his abiding interest in art to give Boyd the rare skill of translating visual idiom into intelligent prose. Unfortunately, many pieces in the later sections of Bamboo fail to rise to this standard". Urquhart's conclusion is that Bamboo "is solid stuff, and occasionally inspiring, but too big". "Boyd" he says "is undoubtedly a substantial writer but this block of journalism confirms the mighty labour of his workaday career, rather than the more memorable flights of fictional transcendence".

Adam Mars-Jones, who reviewed the book for The Observer, was unimpressed. He said: "Does William Boyd write effective prose? Not often. He is neither an intellectual nor a stylist, and in the absence of rigour or sparkle Bamboo is not an enjoyable read". "Journalism", says Mars-Jones, "is normally assumed to promote economy of expression, but there's no sign of that here... The only times William Boyd's non-fiction comes alive is when he writes about art, not in general terms but when he describes a particular artist's procedures in detail... the dust falls off his prose and he seems a different writer".
