= Restless (novel) =

2006 novel written by William Boyd

- First edition
- Author: William Boyd
- Language: English
- Genre: Spy novel
- Publisher: Bloomsbury
- Publication date: 2006
- Publication place: United Kingdom
- Media type: Print (hardback and paperback)
- ISBN: 1-59691-236-7
- OCLC: 64289453
- Dewey Decimal: 823/.914 22
- LC Class: PR6052.O9192 R47 2006
- Preceded by: Any Human Heart (2002)
- Followed by: Ordinary Thunderstorms (2009)

Restless is an espionage novel written by William Boyd, published in 2006. It won the Costa Prize for fiction.

The novel depicts the tale of a young woman who discovers that her mother was recruited as a spy during World War II. The book continually switches between time periods and, in doing so, from first to third person.

According to the author, it is one of the first novels to deal with the British Security Coordination service in New York. The book gained general public interest when it was chosen for inclusion in 'Book Club 2007', on the UK television show Richard & Judy. It is the first Boyd novel to heavily feature espionage, others include; Waiting for Sunrise (2012), Solo (2013) his James Bond continuation novel and Gabriel's Moon (2024).

== Plot summary ==
Eva, a young Russian woman, is recruited after her brother's death to work for the British secret service. During this time she falls for her mentor and boss, Lucas Romer. But all is not as it seems as Romer is working as a double agent which ultimately leads to the attempted murder of Eva, alongside the deaths of other agents.

The tale is interlinked with the story of Eva's daughter in the 1970s and how she comes to terms with the discovery of her mother's secret life. The setting of the novel is London, Oxford, Scotland, continental Europe, and the United States.

== Reception ==
Marianne MacDonald, for The Observer, said that Boyd's novel was "a good, rollicking read...Restless pulls you deep into the obscure, forgotten intricacies of wartime espionage, in particular the covert operations run by the British in America before Pearl Harbor".

David Mattin, reviewing Restless for The Independent, described the book's ending as "both page-turning and deft, leaving us with a moving feeling that it is our histories, and our ever-changing, private interpretations of them, that render us ultimately unknowable. Restless is that rare thing: a spy thriller from a first-rate narrative intelligence."

Marking the national year of reading, Queen Camilla was pictured as a fan of Restless.

== Adaptation ==
In December 2012 the BBC aired a two-part TV adaptation based on the novel. It was produced by Hilary Bevan Jones, directed by Edward Hall and featured Hayley Atwell, Rufus Sewell, Michelle Dockery, Michael Gambon and Charlotte Rampling.

== Source ==
- Boyd, William. Restless, Bloomsbury, 2006, ISBN 978-0-7475-8620-3
