= Brazzaville Beach =

1990 novel by William Boyd

- First edition
- Author: William Boyd
- Publisher: Sinclair-Stevenson
- Publication date: 1990
- ISBN: 978-0-14-014658-5
- OCLC: 24848591
- Preceded by: The New Confessions (1987)
- Followed by: The Blue Afternoon (1993)

Brazzaville Beach is a novel by William Boyd, for which he was awarded the James Tait Black Memorial Prize for 1990, and the McVitie's Prize for Scottish Writer of the Year. The book tells the story of a woman, Hope Clearwater, researching chimpanzees, and the circumstances that brought her to Africa. It is Boyd's first novel with a female protagonist and the first to be written, at least in part, from a first person female perspective. Boyd said that rather than try to consider how a woman, as opposed to a man, would respond to certain situations he focused on developing and understanding Hope's character and personality.

== Plot summary ==
Brazzaville Beach consists of three separative narratives. The first is Hope Clearwater's reflections on her current life whilst living in a beach house on Brazzaville Beach. The second narrative is a description of her former marriage to John Clearwater, a mathematician, who gradually goes mad resulting from failure to make progress in his academic research. The third narrative, and by far the most graphic, is the narrator's account of her work in a national park called Grosso Arvore (Big Tree), where she tracks the movements of a small band of chimpanzees that have split off from a larger group in the north.

John Clearwater, Hope's former husband, is a mathematician thirsty for discovery and fame. This part of the narrative is set in London, where the couple share her flat in South Kensington, and southern England, where Hope works as an ecologist on an intriguing hedgerow mapping project in Dorset. At the beginning of their marriage the two are very much in love with Hope believing that John is the ideal man for her owing to his rather eccentric but empathetic character and strong intelligence. She is uninterested in working after getting her PhD until her former Professor forces her to take on the hedgerow mapping project. After being interviewed by Munro, its leader, Hope discovers she is pleased to be working once more, losing weight because she is outside all day, and enjoying the disciplined approach she has to adopt:

Now she was working again she enjoyed and savoured the unrelenting rigour of her approach to her task, the unswerving persistence of her routine and the evident success of her experimentation. In her work she was achieving something irrefutably concrete. However recondite, however parochial, she was adding a few grains of sand to that vast hill that was the sum of human knowledge. She was discovering aspects of the English landscape that were unknown or hidden; and what pleased her most was that she could prove she was right.

However, whilst Hope's work is going well, her husband's is going badly with John failing to make progress with his mathematical research into chaos theory, and Hope finds herself unable to deal with its consequences. The first signs are when he is caught digging an illegal long trench on the Knap estate in Dorset, work that he feels will help him visualise the mathematical formulae he is trying to come to grips with (having worked before during their stay at a rented cottage in Scotland). He then breaks into hysterics in an Italian restaurant back in London and matters are made worse when Hope discovers he is having an affair with the wife of a Polish university colleague. Their marriage breaks down and irretrievably and tragically, John commits suicide. Hope flees to Africa to recover from the ordeal.

The Grosso Arvore Research Centre, where Hope seeks asylum, is the creation of Eugene Mallabar. After studying wild chimps for the last twenty-five years, Mallabar knows more about them than anyone else on earth. He is the author of "The Peaceful Primate" and "Primate's Progress" and the recipient of million-dollar grants. Mallabar has just finished writing a magnum opus that will be the last word on the subject of the seemingly gentle beast with which man shares 98 percent of his DNA. Hope Clearwater, however, slowly comes to the realization that the chimps are up to no good as the two groups of chimpanzees she is studying come into lethal conflict. Males from the northern group, led by the alpha male Darius, start patrolling into the southerners' territory and then start to kill, with extreme cruelty, the rival males - one an old chimpanzee called Mr Jeb, and the other Muffin, an adolescent. What she sees brings Hope herself into conflict with Mallabar, and threatens the very existence of Grosso Arvore research project and his lifelong study of primates.

In tandem with the other two narratives are Hope's recollections of her affair with Usman Shoukry, an Egyptian mercenary airforce pilot flying sorties in a MiG-15 against rebel army groups. Hope is able to meet him when she carries out supply runs in the reserve's Land Rover to Brazzaville, the provincial capital. He surprises her one time when he designs the world's smallest aeroplanes by strapping wings and landing gears made from match-sticks and paper onto horse flies. Hope and Usman are both genuinely fond of each other during their time together, with Usman making plans to buy one of the run-down houses on the beach where they go to relax and swim, until he meets an untimely end on one of his missions. Hope herself gets caught up in the civil war when she and Ian Vail are captured by Dr Amilcar and his atomique boum volleyball team, who commandeer their Land Rover to return more quickly to the UNAMO stronghold in the Musave River Territories following a failed offensive against the Federal Army.

The story intertwines different narrative strands as the reader is led into the vortex of Hope's complex world. Accompanying this are the author's detailed descriptions of chaos theory, the social and professional wrangling between the different project members working at the Grosso Avore Research Centre (Ian and Roberta Vail, the thoroughly dislikeable Anton Hauser and the Mallabars themselves), along with the human-like behaviour of the chimpanzees as one group sets out to destroy the other. The aggressors' motive is to ensure the return of the alpha female, Rita Lu, to her original group which has become dysfunctional during her absence, and these chimpanzee wars only come to an end as a result of human intervention.
