= The Blue Afternoon =

1993 book by William Boyd

- First edition
- Author: William Boyd
- Language: English
- Publisher: Sinclair Stevenson (UK); Alfred A. Knopf (US)
- Publication date: 1993
- Publication place: Scotland
- Media type: Print (Paperback)
- ISBN: 0-679-77260-X
- OCLC: 36394189
- Preceded by: Brazzaville Beach (1990)
- Followed by: Armadillo (1998)

The Blue Afternoon (1993) is a novel by William Boyd. It won the Sunday Express Book of the Year in the year of its publication and the Los Angeles Times Book Prize for Fiction.

== Plot introduction ==
It is Los Angeles 1936. Kay Fischer is a young, ambitious architect who is shadowed by a mysterious stranger claiming to be her father. Within weeks of their first encounter, Kay will join him for an extraordinary journey into the old man's past, initially in search of a murderer, but finally in celebration of a glorious, undying love.

== Plot summary ==
=== Los Angeles, 1936 ===
Kay Fischer is an architect who has recently been defrauded by her ex-partner, Eric Meyersen. As such, she is trying to start her architectural practice again on her own. She still keeps in contact with Philip, her ex-husband and an unsuccessful Hollywood script writer, from whom she got divorced after the death of their baby son who had a hole in his heart. Kay learns that an old man has been enquiring about her and she is confronted by a Dr Salvador Carriscant who tells her that he is her father. Thinking him a crank, she asks her mother, Annaliese Leys, more questions about her real father, Hugh Paget, an Englishman, missionary and teacher who died in a fire in German New Guinea in 1903.

Carriscant tells his daughter that he wants her to find a man called Paton Bobby in connection with a murder that happened in the distant past. Through a contact of Philip's, they track him down at his ranch south of Santa Fe. They take a journey together to visit him and Kay is astounded by the reaction of both men when they are re-united but Carriscant tells her very little about what is discussed. However, he does show her an old photograph taken at the Aishlie Tennis Cup, and says that he needs to find the woman in it – the wife of an embassy official - who is now living in Lisbon, Portugal and states that he would like her to go with him to try to locate her. Kay, in the meantime, is distracted by the sale of the house she has finished building; it was to be hers but she has to sell it to help keep her company afloat. She shows a Mrs Luard Turner around it and the sale is completed. She also takes her mother to Carriscant's boarding house, telling her she believes him to be a private detective hired by Meynard, and her mother states she has never seen him before although Kay can tell she is lying by her apparent lack of interest in who he is. She then visits a new site she is planning to develop with her foreman, Larry Rugola, and on the way back they drop in on 2265 Micheltorreno, only to find it being knocked down by Eric Meyersen, who tells Kay that they are going to build a very similar house there but with a different architect.

Feeling down in the dumps, Kay decides to take up her 'father's' offer of the trip to Lisbon - vital for him as he does not have the finances to pay for the trip. However, in return her father has to tell her all about his family and the next part of the book is about his life in Manila in the Philippines. Carriscant is the son of Archibald Carriscant, a Scotsman and railway engineer, who married Juliana, the daughter of a local mestizo landowner. After studying medicine at Glasgow University, during which time Archibald died, their son Salvador returned to Manila to set up his practice in 1897.

=== Manila, 1902 ===
Dr Salvador Carriscant becomes the most celebrated surgeon in the Philippines, working at the San Jeronimo Hospital in Manila. However, he is in a strong rivalry with the hospital's director, Dr Cruz, who is totally against the new surgical methods of Listerism introduced by Salvador, preferring to work in Salvador's eyes as 'an antediluvian sawbones cum sinister circus performer'. Salvador's work is made easier because of his highly trained Filipino anesthetist, Pantaleon Quiroga, who assists him in every operation at San Jeronimo. Quiroga is also an aeroplane enthusiast; he has built and housed one in his newly built 'nipa' barn and shows it one day to Carriscant. The surgeon is paid a surprise visit by Paton Bobby, Chief of Constabulary and asked to accompany him to examine the dead body of a young American marine called Ephraim Ward. The corpse is taken by them to the hospital mortuary and put on ice. In the meantime, Salvador returns home to his wife, Annaliese, with whom he has fallen out of love and not had sex with for a whole year. The next day, he discovers that the 'peninsularo' Dr Isidro Cruz has removed the body and so he and Bobby visit the Dr's house near the small village of Flores to recover. He tells them he has it owing to lack of room in the hospital morgue and both men are disgusted by the unhygienic conditions of the Spaniard's domestic operating theatre.

Carriscant decides to take a whore in one of the brothels in Gardenia Street in the Sampaloc district. However, he meets the drunk American military doctor, Wieland, in the Ice-Cream Parlor and has to tell a lie about visiting his cook’s mother for her hernia. He tries to leave but is trapped in the backyard of the whorehouse. Eventually, he scrambles over the wall and on his way back home in the early hours of the morning is nearly killed by a stray arrow. He remonstrates with the American woman doing target practice and finds he is bowled over by her looks. He asks Bobby who she might be, saying his wife met her at a church function, and the policeman thinks it is the Headmistress of the Gerlinger School. Carriscant goes to the school and is told by the nuns she is walking at the Luneta where the islanders parade in the evening. He spots her and finds an opportunity to speak to her but she rebuffs him, stating that her name is not Rudolfa as he presumes – one of the men calls her Delphine and, seeing that there might be some trouble, Carriscant is obliged to leave.

Paton Bobby comes to see Carriscant as another body has been found – this time a soldier called Corporal Maximilian Braun, and Carriscant also meets a young American Colonel called Sieverance. Salvador examines the body and notes that the heart has been removed. They then visit Governor Taft’s office in the Malacanan Palace to update him on the situation and Carriscant gives him his negative opinion about Dr Wieland’s abilities. Carriscant is hauled before Cruz and Wieland for a dressing down and a fight ensues between the three men whose enmity has now spilled over. The doctor is then summoned by a note to Jepson Sieverance’s house and here he re-encounters Delphine, the Colonel’s wife who is suffering from acute appendicitis. Cruz and Wieland appear to examine her but Carriscant persuades her to ignore their misinformed medical opinions and she is taken to San Jeronimo where he successfully performs an operation on her, also thrilled to be able to see and touch her naked body whilst she is under an anaesthetic.

Delphine Sieverance makes a slow but sure recovery and Salvador visits her at her house as a patient. She appears very glad to see him and also gives him a novel to read in order that he may return it to her at a later date. Sieverance’s regiment is called away to fight the insurgents and Salvador visits Calle Lagarda once more – as he is putting the book back in the library he trips and falls and falls into Delphine and they now recognise their attraction to each other. One day at his hospital, he is visited by Mrs Sieverance who is complaining of a pain in her abdomen. She is undressed by Salvador in private on his examination couch and they have sex with each other.

A third body is now discovered, that of a poor female slum dweller who is four months pregnant. A scalpel is found by her body and Bobby asks Carriscant if one is missing from his hospital. Carriscant does an inventory check and discovers there is. He informs Bobby and also tells him that he believes it was planted next to the body by Cruz and Wieland to implicate him in the murder. Bobby dismisses this as fanciful but tells him that he believes the murderer could be Cruz as his family came from Batangas in southern Luzon where the rebellion was fiercest. Back at the hospital he is summoned to Cruz’s side of the hospital and Cruz shows him a man with an exposed beating heart that has six sutures in it, believing this to be a great scientific experiment until Carriscant informs him it was already performed seven years earlier in Germany. Carriscant and his wife attend an official reception given by Governor Taft and his wife and here he meets Delphine once again and they arrange another meeting. They meet and he tries to have sex with her again but she is concerned about the servants and pushes him away. However, Delphine comes to Carriscant’s surgery once more and they have sex again, and she tells him about her life and marriage to Sieverance to whom she now only feels apathy. As they are leaving, they are interrupted by Pantaleon and Carriscant reveals his love. Panteleon understands the situation and lends the couple his ‘nipa’ barn in the afternoons for their assignments. One day, the doctor receives a note from Delphine asking to meet her on the Luneta and she reveals to him that she is pregnant. He later encounters Sieverance and learns that they are to return to the USA, so he dashes round to see Delphine and is forced to set fire to a shed in her friend’s garden to interrupt the bridge party she is attending and tells her he has a plan that will resolve their situation.

Annaliese is remorseful over her coldness towards her husband and effects a reconciliation by having sex with him again. In the meantime, Carriscant goes to see Nicanor Axel, who has smuggled in an engine for Pantaleon’s plane to avoid the duty, and arranges for two passengers to leave on his boat. He is interrupted in his consulting rooms by Pantaleon who tells him that the Amberway-Richault flying prize is taking place in Paris on 30 May 1903 and that they must complete their flight first. Carriscant refuses to be his passenger, stating that he would be terrified but Pantaleon is by now totally obsessive and threatens to reveal his affair. The test flight of Drs Pantaleon Quiroga, accompanied by Dr Salvador Carriscant, finally takes place from the ‘nipa’ barn attended by a sizeable crowd. The machines launches itself into the air and flies over the mark and much higher than they expected before finally crashing by the San Roque creek – Salvador is severely winded and Pantaleon dead. Now, in his grief, the doctor puts his plan into effect. One evening he is visited by Sieverance and Delphine, to whom he has given cordite to make her appear ill. He takes her into the operating theatre and gives the Colonel a glass of rum laced with chloral. He then puts the woman into an ice chest to make her look dead white and covers himself and his theatre with blood, before telling Sieverance that his wife has died and showing him her body. He also shows him the dead body of a five-month-old foetus and Sieverance breaks down. After taking the Colonel home, he returns to Delphine and warms her up before sending her in a carriage to Axel’s boat. However, just as he is readying himself to leave – pretending that he is going to his mother’s house for two weeks – he is arrested by Paton Bobby and his constables for the murder of Sieverance, whose body has been found with two bullet holes in its head.

=== Lisbon, 1936 ===
The ending consists of Carriscant and Kay arriving in Lisbon and the reader will have to read the story to find out if their search for the mystery woman is successful and why Carriscant is looking for her.

== Historical background to the novel ==
U.S. troops invaded Manila in 1898 and waged war with the Spaniards and Filipinos in the Spanish–American War and the Philippine–American War. Following the defeat of Spain, U.S. forces took control of the city and the islands in one of the most brutal and forgotten chapters of Philippine American history. The United States Navy, under Admiral George Dewey, defeated the Spanish squadron in the Battle of Manila Bay on May 1, 1898. Admiral Dewey testified that, after the battle, the Spanish Governor wished to surrender to the Americans rather than the Filipinos, whom he feared.

Having just won their independence from Spain, the Filipinos were fiercely opposed to once again being occupied. Emilio Aguinaldo proclaimed the First Philippine Republic at the Malolos Congress and had begun to build the foundations for an independent nation. Admiral Dewey, however, claimed he never recognized the Philippine Republic, as he did not have the authority to do so and did not consider it an organized government. War broke out between the Filipinos and the Americans on February 4, 1899, when an American soldier shot and killed a Filipino in Manila. The Americans pursued the retreating Filipino forces province by province, until General Emilio Aguinaldo (then president of the Republic) surrendered in Palanan, Isabela, on March 23, 1901.

The American high command at that time was headed by Elwell Stephen Otis who ordered invasion and occupation. By that time the Filipino troops had taken classic defensive positions around Manila to attempt to keep them out. However, the poorly armed, ill-trained soldiers could not compete with the superior firepower of the Americans. They were severely beaten; so much so that it has been reported that the dead were used as breastworks. Under the command of Aguinaldo, the Filipinos began a guerrilla campaign to resist the new occupiers. This campaign had limited success in the early days following the initial occupation of the Americans although any successes were short-lived. The replacement of Otis by General Arthur MacArthur Jr. began an extensive campaign to suppress the local population. This campaign by the United States has been reported as being a particularly bloody suppression with wild reports of commanders ordering the murder of everyone over 10-years-old. Specific mention of these reprisals is made in The Blue Afternoon.

In the Treaty of Paris (1898), Spain handed over the Philippines to the United States of America for US$20,000,000. This ended 333 years of Spanish rule in the islands. Manila continued under an American military government until civil government was established for the city on July 31, 1901. The Philippine–American War continued through 1903 at the cost of many lives both in Manila and elsewhere in the Islands. In 1935, the United States government committed itself to granting the Philippines independence after a ten-year transition, a period that was extended by one year due to World War II.

== Sources ==
- The Blue Afternoon, William Boyd, Penguin Books, 1993
- William Boyd discusses the idea of the maxim 'write what you know' in relation to his own writing
