= Argument (disambiguation) =

In logic and philosophy, an argument is an attempt to persuade someone of something, or give evidence or reasons for accepting a particular conclusion.

Argument may also refer to:

== Mathematics and computer science ==
- Argument (complex analysis), a function which returns the polar angle of a complex number
- Command-line argument, an item of information provided to a program when it is started
- Parameter (computer programming), a piece of data provided as input to a subroutine
- Argument principle, a theorem in complex analysis
- An argument of a function, also known as an independent variable

== Language and rhetoric ==
- Argument (literature), a brief summary, often in prose, of a poem or section of a poem or other work
- Argument (linguistics), a phrase that appears in a syntactic relationship with the verb in a clause
- Oral argument in the United States, a spoken presentation to a judge or appellate court by a lawyer (or parties when representing themselves) of the legal reasons why they should prevail
- Closing argument, in law, the concluding statement of each party's counsel reiterating the important arguments in a court case

== Other uses ==
- Musical argument, a concept in the theory of musical form
- Argument (ship), an Australian sloop wrecked in 1809
- Das Argument, a German academic journal
- Argument Clinic, a Monty Python sketch
- A disagreement between two or more parties or the discussion of the disagreement
- Argument (horse)

== See also ==
- The Argument (disambiguation)
- argumentation
