= Protobiography =

1998 autobiographical work by William Boyd

- Cover of 2005 paperback edition published by Penguin Books
- Author: William Boyd
- Publisher: Bridgewater Press
- Publication date: 1998
- Pages: 56
- ISBN: 0141022507

Protobiography is an autobiographical work by the Scottish writer William Boyd that recalls his early childhood. It was published initially in 1998 by Bridgewater Press in a limited edition. A paperback edition was published in 2005 as part of a series of 70 books celebrating the 70th birthday of Penguin Books. The Penguin edition included an additional chapter, "The Hothouse", which was first published in Boyd's book School Ties in 1985.

== Design ==
The book's cover was designed by Gnikram Nevets. The art director was John Hamilton.

== Contents ==
- "Preface"
- "Fly Away Home"
- "The Lion Griefs"
- "The Hothouse"
- "Memories of the Sausage Fly"
