= Ordinary Thunderstorms =

Book by William Boyd

- First edition
- Author: William Boyd
- Language: English
- Genre: Thriller
- Publisher: Bloomsbury
- Publication date: 2009
- Publication place: United Kingdom
- Media type: Print (Hardback)
- Pages: 404
- Preceded by: Restless (2006)
- Followed by: Waiting for Sunrise (2012)

Ordinary Thunderstorms is a 2009 novel by William Boyd. It explores the dark side of London's underworld and the international pharmaceutical industry.

== Plot ==
Adam Kindred is a recently divorced climatologist who has moved back to England. After attending an interview for a Senior Research Fellowship position at Imperial College, London, he goes into an Italian restaurant in Chelsea and briefly encounters Dr Philip Wang, who accidentally leaves a file behind. Adam takes it to Wang's hotel, only to discover that Wang has been murdered and still has the knife in his body. Before Wang dies, he asks Adam to remove it and so Adam becomes incriminated in his murder. Adam is tailed by the murderer Jonjo to his hotel and only narrowly escapes, but he sees Jonjo's face.

Deciding to take refuge, he shelters in a small enclosed patch of gardens on London's Embankment to give himself time to think. He decides to go underground, cutting up all his cards and removing anything that could identify him. He soon leads the life of a down-and-out, searching in rubbish bins for food and only venturing out at night. In the meantime, he decides to try to find out from the file in his possession why Wang was murdered and if there is any connection to Calenture-Deutz, the pharmaceutical company Wang was working for. Calenture-Deutz is a company set up by Ingram Fryzer who is another of the novel's protagonists. Ingram is married with three children and is about to reap large profits from the introduction of a new anti-asthma drug, Zembla-4, that is just about to be launched onto the market after its clinical trials supervised by Dr Wang. To speed up the search for the killer, the company offers a £100,000 reward.

Adam decides to visit St Botolph's hospital to find out what Wang was working on. After leaving the hospital he loses his way and is viciously mugged near the Shaftsbury estate [a sink estate] in Rotherhithe, and is helped by Mhouse, a prostitute, who gives him the address of the Church of John Christ. He decides to visit the church to get a decent meal and meets others there who are in the same dire situation. Meanwhile, Ingram is having his own troubles - Alfredo Rilke is a major shareholder in his company and he wants to launch Zembla-4 against Ingram's wishes, since he considers it too early. It turns out, unbeknown to Ingram, that Rilke has arranged for Jonjo, the man who killed Philip Wang, to find Adam and the missing file which is vital to Rilke since it contains evidence that is damaging to the new drug.

Adam continues his life as a beggar, doing very well posing as a partially sighted man to obtain money from sympathetic people. Meanwhile, Jonjo is getting closer to him. His enquiries lead him to the Shaftsbury estate and he pays to find out where Adam is. He learns where Adam was dropped off by Mhouse and her friend, Mohammed, and waits for Adam at his Embankment hideaway. Adam recognises him from the earlier encounter and decides to rent a room with Mhouse and her young son, Ly-on, paying Mhouse for sex from his begging money. His life becomes more stable until, one evening whilst walking hand in hand with Ly-on, he passes Jonjo who does not recognise him with his beard. Adam tells Mhouse he has to leave for Scotland and shacks up with Vladimir, whom he met at the Church of John Christ. When he finds Vlad dead the next day, Adam decides to take on Vlad's fake identity as Primo Belem and his new job as a hospital porter at Bethnal & Bow. He gets a transfer to St Botolph's, where he is able to establish why there are problems with the Zembla-4 drug.

Ingram Fryzer realizes that there is something strange about the drug but decides to fit in with Rilke's plans, knowing that he will financially benefit from them. However, he suspects that there is a plot to unseat him. In the meantime, Adam has decided on a plan for attacking Calenture-Deutz following the death of Mhouse at the hands of Jonjo. He also meets Rita, a policewoman, whilst identifying Mhouse's body, and starts to see more of her. He puts his scheme into place and, as a result, Fryzer's comfortable life starts to collapse around him, particularly after a shareholder's meeting and the sale of shares by his selfish, weak brother-in-law, Ivo Lord Redcastle, who is a director on the company's board.

Bad news starts to surround Zembla-4 and Rilke eventually informs Ingram that his proposed takeover of Calenture-Deutz is now off. Ingram has also been feeling strangely ill and it turns out he has a brain tumour that requires an operation. Jonjo, having failed to find Kindred, is sacked from his position as a 'security consultant' and is forced to leave the country after realizing that he will be made the fall guy for Philip Wang's murder and that killers are now after him. And Adam Kindred, happily involved with Rita and Ly-on, wonders whether he should retain his identity of Primo Belem or tell Rita the truth and assume his former life as Adam Kindred.
