= Stars and Bars (novel) =

1984 novel by William Boyd

- First edition (UK)
- Author: William Boyd
- Publisher: Hamish Hamilton (UK); William Morrow & Co (US)
- Publication date: 1984 (UK); 1985 (USA)
- Pages: 255 (UK); 334 (US)
- ISBN: 0241113431
- Preceded by: An Ice Cream War (1982)
- Followed by: The New Confessions (1987)

Stars and Bars, the third novel by Scottish author William Boyd, was first published in 1984 in the United Kingdom by Hamish Hamilton, and in 1985 in the United States by William Morrow & Co. Boyd subsequently developed it as a screenplay and it was released as a film in 1988.

The book tells the tragicomic story of attempts by visiting British art appraiser Henderson Dore, in New York City and the Deep South, to negotiate the cultural differences between British and American approaches to conducting business.

Reviewing the novel for The New York Times, Caroline Seebohm said: "Mr. Boyd has some funny and perceptive things to say about English shyness as opposed to American spontaneity... But the author seems also to latch on to what are now fairly well aired differences between the English and Americans – pronunciation, for instance, and that old cliche about Americans ruining whiskey with ice... The major scenes in Stars and Bars take place in Luxora Beach, a place of unremitting bleakness and despair. Mr. Boyd's talent in evoking a place, which worked for him so well in his earlier two novels, serves him brilliantly here. In fact, the reader is forced to ask why on earth Henderson, wimpish though he is, does not get out when he can... The point about Henderson's liberation from his roots is well taken, and his adventures through the jungle are amusingly narrated, but the 'new clarity' with which he views the world at the end remains, for the reader, a lingering fog".
