= The Dreams of Bethany Mellmoth =

2017 collection of short stories by William Boyd

- Cover of UK hardback edition
- Author: William Boyd
- Cover artist: Vivian Maier (photographer)
- Publisher: Viking Press
- Publication date: 2017
- Pages: 256
- ISBN: 978-0241295878

The Dreams of Bethany Mellmoth is a collection of short stories by the Scottish writer William Boyd. It was published in 2017 by Viking Press. Penguin Books released an unabridged audiobook version, also in 2017.

Reviewing the book for the Financial Times, Alex Preston described it as "a largely superb collection of interlinked stories" that are "brilliant and bewitching". Elizabeth Lowry, for The Guardian, said that the stories "are glossily knowing in the manner of Somerset Maugham... They are unfailingly amusing and clever; their only fault is that they sometimes strive for effects of pathos that the urbane narrative angle can’t quite support".

== Contents ==
=== Part I ===
- "The Man Who Liked Kissing Women" – art dealer Ludo Abernathy remains faithful to his pregnant third wife, substituting kisses for sex, but when he defrauds a mysterious woman of £1m over a Lucian Freud portrait, his resolve weakens. (online text)
- "The Road Not Taken" – the story of a failed relationship told backwards looking back from a chance meeting in Homebase to the first encounter in a university American Literature class discussing Robert Frost's eponymous poem. (online text from The Spectator 14 December 2013)
- "Camp K 101" – a German UN soldier leaves bananas for one-legged chimpanzee. On his return to Germany he tries to free a barrel organ grinder's monkey. (online text from The Sunday Times, 11 September 2010 – subscription required)
- "Humiliation" – author Yves Hill flees from London to Paris and the Dordogne after his 4th novel Oblong receives scathing reviews. He then finds opportunity for revenge on one of his detractors. (online text from The Spectator, 12 December 2007 – subscription required)
- "Unsent Letters" – letters from an aspiring film director attempting to get his latest project Oblong or Triangle off the ground and meeting with various setbacks. (online text from New Statesman, August 2017 – subscription required)
- "The Things I Stole" – an account of a lifetime of thievery, beginning and ending with a BOAC Speedbird lapel badge (online text from The Guardian, 1 August 2008)
- "The Diaries" – an eventful 60th birthday celebration as told from different viewpoints.

=== Part II ===
- "The Dreams of Bethany Mellmoth" – Bethany Mellmoth moves from dead-end job to dead-end job and from short-term relationship to short-term relationship, trying to find an outlet for her perceived artistic talent, and some stability in her life. (This story first appeared in Notes from the Underground, 2007.)

=== Part III ===
- "The Vanishing Game: An Adventure" – Down-at-heel actor Alec Dunbar is offered £1000 to take a flask of water from London to western Scotland, but he comes to realise he has been set up and determines to use tricks learnt from his film plots to turn tables on his manipulators. (audio version, first appeared as an ebook published by Jaguar Land Rover 12 Nov 2014
