= An Ice-Cream War =

Novel by William Boyd

- First edition
- Author: William Boyd
- Genre: black comedy, war novel
- Publisher: Hamish Hamilton
- Publication date: 1982
- ISBN: 0-375-70502-3
- OCLC: 40744463
- Dewey Decimal: 823/.914 21
- LC Class: PR6052.O9192 I2 1999
- Preceded by: A Good Man in Africa (1981)
- Followed by: Stars and Bars (1984)

An Ice-Cream War (1982) is a black comedy war novel by Scottish author William Boyd. It was nominated for a Booker Prize in the year of its publication. The title is derived from a quotation in a letter (not included in the American editions of the book).

== Synopsis ==
The story focuses on the East African Campaign fought between British and German forces during World War I, and how it affects several people whose paths converge.

The first character introduced is Temple Smith (Walter Smith in the US edition), an American expatriate who runs a successful sisal plantation in British East Africa near Mount Kilimanjaro. Before war breaks out in August 1914, Smith is on cordial terms with his German half-English neighbour, Erich von Bishop. Smith even shops for coffee plant seedlings at the botanical garden in the capital of German East Africa, Dar es Salaam. Major von Bishop burns Smith's sisal and linseed plantation in the opening campaign of the Great War, and then dismantles the massive decorticator, the industrial centrepiece of Smith's sisal farm operations. Now made a penniless refugee, and unable to secure any war reparations from the British colonial bureaucracy, Smith places his wife and children with his missionary father-in-law and joins the British military forces in Nairobi, pursuing vengeance against von Bishop over the next four years of the war in East Africa.

The second narrative strand involves Felix Cobb, the studious youngest son of an aristocratic and traditional British military family, every one of whom he despises apart from his older brother Gabriel, a captain. The latter soon marries his sweetheart Charis (inspiring a certain jealousy in Felix), but war breaks out while Gabriel is on his honeymoon in Normandy, and he makes haste back to his regiment. Gabriel is posted to Africa, where he befriends psychotic fellow soldier Bilderbeck and is wounded in the Battle of Tanga. Whilst recovering in a Prisoner of War hospital, he develops an infatuation for Erich von Bishop's plump, stubborn wife Liesl, who works there as a nurse. The novel could be considered a satire on the ineptitude of authority in wartime.

== Reaction ==
As a critic of The New York Times wrote the following of the book at its time of publication:

"Its characters – the survivors in particular – are mercilessly knocked about by the force of historical circumstance: by the war, by the problems of commanding men whose culture they do not understand and whose language they do not even speak, by the influenza epidemic that followed immediately upon the Armistice. But Mr. Boyd sees even domestic life, as Gabriel's and Felix's mother sees her marriage, 'as a relentless challenge, an unending struggle against appalling adverse conditions to get her own way.' That bleak comic vision suggests the early Evelyn Waugh, and An Ice-Cream War is a good enough novel, for all its flaws, to persuade me that Mr. Boyd, who was born in 1952, may someday write a great one."
