= Gabriel's Moon =

2024 novel by William Boyd

- Paperback edition
- Author: William Boyd
- Publisher: Viking Penguin
- Publication date: 2024 (hardback); 2025 (paperback)
- Pages: 272
- ISBN: 9780241542057
- Preceded by: The Romantic (2022)
- Followed by: The Predicament (2025)

Gabriel's Moon is the eighteenth novel by British author William Boyd, published in 2024, by Viking Penguin. Set against the backdrop of the Cold War in the early 1960s, the book follows Gabriel Dax, a travel writer who becomes inadvertently entangled in international espionage. The narrative explores themes of memory, identity, and betrayal. The story includes Boyd's regular blending of historical and fictional people and events. It is the fourth Boyd novel to heavily feature espionage, following Restless (2006), Waiting for Sunrise (2012) and Solo (2013) his James Bond continuation novel.

== Plot ==
The novel begins in 1936 with a traumatic house fire that kills young Gabriel Dax's mother, leaving him haunted by confused memories and chronic insomnia. By 1960, Gabriel has established himself as a successful travel writer. While on assignment in Léopoldville (now Kinshasa), he surprisingly secures an interview with Congolese Prime Minister Patrice Lumumba, who tells Gabriel that he fears assassination and implicates Western intelligence agencies.

On his return to London, Gabriel finds himself under surveillance, and his notes from the Lumumba interview become the target of interest from both MI6 and the CIA. He is approached by Faith Green, an enigmatic MI6 handler, who recruits him for a covert operation in Spain involving the retrieval of a surrealist artwork. As Gabriel delves deeper into the world of espionage, he uncovers unsettling truths about his past and his family.

== Trilogy ==
In interviews, Boyd has discussed his fascination with the espionage genre and its capacity to explore complex human behaviors. He remarked, "I feel that the world of espionage is actually the human condition writ large. We've all betrayed people. We've all lied to people."

Boyd also revealed that Gabriel's Moon is the first in a planned trilogy featuring Gabriel Dax, indicating his intention to further explore the character's unwitting involvement in the espionage landscape. The second Dax book, The Predicament, was published in 2025.

== Reception ==
Marcel Theroux wrote that the book "...skilfully performs double duty: working as a satisfying standalone story and setting Gabriel up for further escapades. The book is a vivid re-creation of the early 1960s, and one of the pleasures it offers is a feeling of agreeable time travel to fascinating corners of a vanished world. These are conveyed with a filmic vibrancy ..."

Malcolm Forbes commented that "the novel is at its most compelling when Gabriel is either interacting with his mesmerizing and fiendishly shrewd handler or doing her bidding in foreign lands ... Boyd routinely impresses with his portrait of an individual who is in too deep emotionally and in the dark as to what is going on around him."

In a largely negative review in The New York Times, Daniel Nieh bemoans the way that "Boyd conveys these plot points in expository dialogue, insulating the narrative from any real sense of danger".
