= Fascination (short story collection) =

Short story collection

- First edition (UK)
- Author: William Boyd
- Publisher: Hamish Hamilton (UK); Knopf Books (US)
- Publication date: 2004 (UK); 2005 (US)
- Pages: 209

Fascination is a collection of short stories by the Scottish writer William Boyd. It was published in the United Kingdom in 2004 by Hamish Hamilton and in the United States in 2005 by Knopf Books.

Reviewing the book for The Guardian, M. John Harrison said: "the stories collected here are perfect. They would seem a little too perfect if they weren't also suffused with an understanding of love, desire and emotional incompetence. Behind the comedy and the stacked sleights of hand, vulnerable people can be seen quite clearly, blundering about trying to make contact with one another; personal disaster lurks and real lives are lost."
