= The Destiny of Nathalie 'X' =

1995 short story collection by William Boyd

- First edition (UK)
- Author: William Boyd
- Language: English
- Publisher: Sinclair-Stevenson Ltd (UK); Viking Press (Canada); Knopf (US)
- Publication date: 1995 (UK & Canada)
- Publication place: United Kingdom
- Media type: Print
- Pages: 288
- ISBN: 1-85619-570-8

The Destiny of Nathalie 'X' is the second short story collection by William Boyd, published in 1995, some fourteen years after his first collection, On the Yankee Station.

== Stories ==
- "The Destiny of Nathalie 'X'" (previously published in Granta) - Aurelién No, a French-speaking West African student wins a prize from ESEC for a short film. He uses the winnings to fund a trip to Hollywood to film the sequel and chooses to set it in a seedy suburb in Westchester near LAX. During filming he is courted by the movie industry who are in turn charmed by him and his principal lead, Delphine Drelle. The story is told by each character in turn.
- "Transfigured Night" (previously published in Granta)- A fictionalized account of the relationship between and troubled poet Georg Trakl and his anonymous sponsor Ludwig Wittgenstein as told from Wittgenstein's perspective and includes many references to his family's history of suicide.
- "Hôtel des Voyageurs" (previously published in the Daily Telegraph and London Magazine) - Inspired by the journals of writer and critic Cyril Connolly it tells of a brief affair between the protagonist, Logan Mountstuart and a French woman. Mountstuart later reappeared in Boyd's novel Any Human Heart.
- "Never Saw Brazil" - London Courier company boss Wesley Bright bemoans his name, and obsessed with Brazilian chorinho music spices up his humdrum life by inventing a shape-shifting Brazilian alter-ego.
- "The Dream Lover" (previously published in London Magazine)- Edward, studying French in Nice befriends Preston, an American who appears to have everything, except a French girlfriend. But Preston's circumstances change and Edward is now the one to be envied.
- "Alpes Maritimes" (previously published in On the Yankee Station)- Edward now has a girlfriend, Ulricke, but instead wants her twin sister Anneliese, but has competition from Steve.
- "N is for N" (previously appeared in Hockney's Alphabet - a short biography of fictional Laotian writer Nguyen N.
- "The Persistence of Vision" - An artist describes his marriage and its associated images.
- "Cork" - a British widow and owner of a Lisbon cork-processing factory tells of her affair with her husband's former office manager, whom she meets every Christmas.

== Reception ==
- The New York Times's Michael Upchurch is full of praise, "the book highlights Mr. Boyd's pleasing variousness as a writer. He is at once as playful as the most perverse metafictionist yet as passionate as the lushest writer of romance. He has a taste for ambiguity and, at the same time, a frank appetite for slapstick. This quality of miscellany may occasionally raise questions about whether he has any cohesive identity as a writer. Yet the very discontinuities that he explores - of personality, of locale, of subject matter - are what he is all about", his "Mr. Boyd's ability to zero in on ordinary human foibles and woes - daydream delusions, cultural dislocations, emotional smash-ups - is swift and sure."
- Michael Bracewell writing in The Independent has more mixed feelings: the collection shows Boyd "as a writer who can fall foul of insipid romanticism and then achieve moments of unique brilliance. It is as though the best stories have been written with the least effort, while the less successful are visibly straining...At his best, Boyd can set a scene in a sentence, deftly selecting those details required to maintain suspense while weighting the tone to suit the temperament of the narrator. Once in character, Boyd can place us behind his eyes - something most writers struggle to achieve. The failures are those stories which are either too slender to support the style or too alien in subject to Boyd's interest in the more romantic levels of history and society." but he ends positively "this is an arresting collection by a fine writer making full use of his formidable talents."
