= A Good Man in Africa (novel) =

William Boyd's first novel, published in 1981

- First edition
- Author: William Boyd
- Publisher: Hamish Hamilton
- Publication date: 1981
- Pages: 256
- Awards: Whitbread First Novel Award; Somerset Maugham Award
- ISBN: 1-4000-3002-1
- OCLC: 53163201
- Dewey Decimal: 823/.914 22
- LC Class: PR6052.O9192 G6 2003
- Followed by: An Ice Cream War (1982)

A Good Man in Africa is the 1981 debut novel by British writer William Boyd. It won both the Whitbread Book Award for a first novel and the Somerset Maugham Award that year.

== Plot ==
Morgan Leafy is First Secretary to the British Deputy High Commission in Nkongsamba in the fictional West African country of Kinjanja. Leafy is unhappy in his post and struggles with various personal and professional difficulties. He becomes entangled in a range of problematic situations, including an affair with his boss’s daughter, a bribery scheme involving a local politician, and a medical crisis involving a venereal disease.

Leafy is tasked with persuading a local politician, Sam Adekunle, to cooperate with the British High Commission. Meanwhile, he is dealing with his own failing health and a blackmail threat. His superior, Arthur Fanshawe, pressures him to manage sensitive diplomatic issues, but Leafy is ill-equipped to do so.

Dr Alex Murray, a local Scottish doctor, becomes involved when Leafy seeks medical treatment and later plays a role in dealing with a broader health emergency in the region. As political tensions rise and Leafy's plans unravel, he finds himself increasingly isolated and out of his depth.

The novel concludes with Leafy facing the consequences of his actions, left with few allies and uncertain prospects.

== Publication ==
Morgan Leafy also appears in two short stories, "Next Boat from Douala" and "The Coup", which concern his departure from Africa. The stories appear in the collection On the Yankee Station, published later in 1981, but as Boyd explained in an interview the collection was actually written before the novel, though he claimed he had written both when he sent the collection to potential publishers. Hamish Hamilton agreed to publish the novel (as yet unwritten) and collection in that order. Boyd admits: "So I said to my new editor, Christopher Sinclair-Stevenson, 'Look, the manuscript is in a shocking state, I just need a couple of months to knock into shape’, and I sat down and wrote A Good Man in Africa in a white heat of dynamic endeavour in three months at my kitchen table."

== Background ==
William Boyd grew up in Western Africa, living in both Ghana and Nigeria. He explains that the setting for the novel "is completely set in Ibadan in Western Nigeria even though I changed the names, but everybody in it is made up. It’s rooted in my autobiography in terms of its colour, texture and smells but the story is – and that’s something that’s always been the case with me – invented. There is an autobiographical element in that the character of Dr Murray is very much a two-dimensional portrait of my father." Boyd said that it was his wife's idea to write a full length novel about Leafy and that he considers that, "inhabiting someone who's absolutely unlike me is more attractive than writing some thinly disguised autobiography".

== Reception ==
- Michiko Kakutani in The New York Times praised the novel, likening it to the work of Evelyn Waugh and Kingsley Amis: "it is as though Lucky Jim had been suddenly transported to the mythical kingdom of Azania in Black Mischief." She concludes, "There are, of course, things a reader might quarrel with: Mr. Boyd's penchant for broad humor and narrative pratfalls makes, at times, for an irritating glibness; and his technical mastery of the novel form obscures the fact that he has yet to develop a voice that is truly his own - the echoes of his predecessors haunt the achievement of this book. Still, this remains a precocious debut indeed, and I eagerly await Mr. Boyd's next novel".
- Kirkus Reviews concluded: "Boyd can lapse from credible black-comedy into cheap farce. Still, if the worst of this energetic novel is reminiscent of crude sit-corns, the best recalls Waugh and Amis – in a dark yet cheerful nightmare that's juiced along by humiliation, fury, and a highly unsentimental view of post-colonial Africa."

== Adaptations ==
In 1985, BBC Radio 4 broadcast an audio adaptation starring Alan Rickman as Leafy. It was repeated on BBC Radio 4 Extra in 2022.

In 1994, the novel was made into a film of the same name, with a script written by Boyd.
