= Good and Bad at Games =

- Written by: William Boyd
- Directed by: Jack Gold
- Starring: Anton Lesser; Dominic Jephcott; Martyn Stanbridge
- Composer: Cream (songs featured in the film)
- Country of origin: United Kingdom
- Original language: English

Production
- Producer: by Victor Glynn

Original release
- Network: Channel 4
- Release: 8 December 1983

Good and Bad at Games is a UK television drama, first shown in the Film on Four strand on Channel 4 Television on 8 December 1983. The screenplay was written by William Boyd and the lead roles of Cox, Mount and Niles were played by Anton Lesser, Dominic Jephcott and Martyn Stanbridge. A young Rupert Graves also appears briefly as Guthrie. The film was directed by Jack Gold, and produced by Victor Glynn.

The story, told partly in flashback to 1968, concerns a clique of English public schoolboys who bully and humiliate an unpopular younger pupil (Cox) who is 'bad at games'. Ten years later Cox uses the naive and equal outsider Niles, who is only included in the clique because he is 'good at games', to find out more about the lead persecutor (Mount), in order to exact revenge.

== Cast ==
- Niles – Martyn Stanbridge
- Cox – Anton Lesser
- Mount – Dominic Jephcott
- Frances – Laura Davenport
- Joyce – Frederick Alexander
- Harrop – Graham Seed
- Colenso – Ewan Stewart
- Guthrie – Rupert Graves
- Tregear – Philip Goodhew
- Girl – Ceri Jackson
- Boy – Tristram Wymark

== Music ==
- The songs "Badge" and "Strange Brew" by the rock group Cream are featured prominently.
