= Stars and Bars (1988 film) =

1988 film by Pat O'Connor

- Theatrical release poster
- Directed by: Pat O'Connor
- Written by: William Boyd
- Produced by: Sanford Lieberson
- Starring: Daniel Day-Lewis; Harry Dean Stanton; Maury Chaykin; Joan Cusack; Keith David; Spalding Gray; Glenne Headly; Laurie Metcalf; Deirdre O'Connell; Will Patton; Martha Plimpton; Steven Wright
- Cinematography: Jerzy Zieliński
- Edited by: Michael Bradsell
- Music by: Stanley Myers
- Distributed by: Columbia Pictures
- Release date: March 18, 1988 (United States)
- Running time: 91 minutes
- Country: United States
- Language: English
- Budget: $7.5 million

Stars and Bars is a 1988 American comedy film directed by Pat O'Connor and starring Daniel Day-Lewis. It is based on William Boyd's 1984 book of the same name.

== Premise ==
A British art expert, Henderson Dores, travels to Georgia in the United States in order to purchase a rare painting by Pierre-Auguste Renoir. He comes across some crazy characters in the process.

== Cast ==
- Daniel Day-Lewis as Henderson Dores
- Harry Dean Stanton as Loomis Gage
- Kent Broadhurst as Ben Sereno
- Maury Chaykin as Freeborn Gage
- Matthew Cowles as Beckman Gage
- Joan Cusack as Irene Stein
- Keith David as Eugene Teagarden
- Spalding Gray as Reverend T.J. Cardew
- Glenne Headly as Cora Gage
- Laurie Metcalf as Melissa
- Bill Moor as Edgar Beeby
- Deirdre O'Connell as Shanda Gage
- Will Patton as Duane Gage
- Martha Plimpton as Bryant
- Rockets Redglare as Peter Gint
- Beatrice Winde as Alma-May
- Steven Wright as Pruitt
- David Strathairn as Charlie
