= Waiting for Sunrise =

2012 novel by William Boyd

- First edition
- Author: William Boyd
- Language: English
- Genre: Spy fiction
- Publisher: Bloomsbury Press
- Publication date: Feb 16, 2012
- Publication place: United Kingdom
- Media type: Print (Hardback & Paperback)
- Pages: 353
- ISBN: 1-4088-1774-8 (h/b); ISBN 1-4088-1858-2 (p/b)
- Preceded by: Ordinary Thunderstorms (2009)
- Followed by: Solo (2013)

Waiting for Sunrise is a 2012 espionage novel by William Boyd. The book was published on April 17, 2012, by Bloomsbury Press in the United Kingdom and by HarperCollins in the United States. It is the second Boyd novel to heavily feature espionage, others include; Restless (2006), Solo (2013), his James Bond continuation novel, and Gabriel's Moon (2024).

== Plot summary ==
=== Part One, Vienna, 1913–14 ===
Lysander Rief is a young actor in Vienna who has come to the city to seek a psychiatric cure for an illness – anorgasmia – from an English doctor, Bensimon. Bensimon has developed his own adjunct to the main line of Freud's psychoanalysis called Parallelism. Whilst sitting in the waiting room, he encounters Captain Alwyn Munro DSO, an English friend of Dr Bensimon's, and a Miss Hettie Bull who is another patient. During the consultation, Bensimon encourages Rief to write a journal. Rief is the son of a famous stage actor, Halifax Rief, and an Austrian chorus singer.

Hettie Bull invites him to an exhibition of her partner, Udo Hoff, and there says she would like to sculpt him. He visits her at her studio in the countryside and sex takes place. They continue to meet in secret and Lysander breaks off his engagement to his fiancée. Despite being cured, he decides to stay on in Vienna but his resources are running low. One day his pension is visited by the Austrian police and he is arrested and charged with the rape of Hettie Bull. He is finally taken to the British Consulate where he learns, by letter, that Hettie is pregnant with their child. An escape with the collusion of the British diplomats is arranged and Lysander ends up in Trieste.

=== Part Two – London, 1914 ===
Lysander takes up his acting work once more and also visits his mother at Claverleigh Hall where she and her second husband, Lord Faulkener, live. He also renews his acquaintance with his uncle, the explorer and eccentric Major Hamo Rief. War breaks out and Lysander decides to join up as a private in the 2/5th (service) battalion of the East Sussex Light Infantry regiment; he is appointed translator at a German internment camp in Bishop's Bay, Wales. Here he is visited by Munro who orders him to appear in London.

Fyfe-Miller, an enigmatic naval officer and Munro introduce him to their superior, Colonel Massinger, and his is instructed by them to travel to Geneva posing as a Swiss railway engineer to discover the identity of a traitor passing on military intelligence to the Germans.

=== Part 3 – Geneva, 1915 ===
Lysander tortures a man to have informations about a secret code. He accidentally kills him while torturing him. Rief successfully completes his task, assisted by another agent, Madame Duchesne. However, because of a misunderstanding, she shoots him three times, almost killing him, as he leaves Switzerland by boat.

=== Part 4 – London, 1915 ===
The traitor still remains at large and Munro and Massinger now order Rief to pose as an officer working on an unfinished investigation in the Directorate of Movements, situated between Waterloo Bridge and Charing Cross Railway Bridge. He has to investigate the twenty-seven senior members, almost all of whom are officers. He reencounters Hettie Bull who is dating a writer and she tells him that their son, Lothar, is living with Udo Hoff in Austria.

Rief singles out one of the officers as a likely candidate and trails his movements, finding out that he is known to his mother, Lady Anna Faulkner, who is now running the very successful Claverleigh Hall War Fund following her husband's death. He is also reunited with his former fiancée, Blanche, during a Zeppelin bombing raid on London's theatre district. After confronting his mother during his investigations, she later commits suicide, explaining her reasons in a letter to her son.

The novel reaches its climax in the closing pages as Rief hunts down his suspect, finally confronting him on a fierce, windy morning on Hampstead Heath. At the end of the novel Lysander Rief resumes his life as an actor but he is a man who has been emotionally scarred by his wartime experiences, looking like someone ‘who is far more at ease occupying the cold security of the dark; a man happier with the dubious comfort of the shadows.’

== Development ==
Boyd stated that he was inspired to write Waiting for Sunrise due to an obsession with Vienna, "particularly at the beginning of the 20th century". He traveled to Vienna to write an article about artist Egon Schiele and during a visit to an apartment that Freud lived in, began wondering what it would be like to visit a psychoanalyst during that time period. For the novel, Boyd created his own version of psychotherapy called "parallelism", which he "pinched from the writing of the American poet Wallace Stevens", stating that it would be "much more fun to think up my own". Boyd also chose to have the theme of "day to day life" present in Waiting for Sunrise, stating: "We know there’s no such thing as objective truth. We can verify subjective truths but everything else is up for grabs."

== Reception ==
Critical reception for Waiting for Sunrise was mostly positive. The Telegraph described the book as a "compelling" bildungsroman, saying it was "both evocative and experimental". Common praise for the book included Boyd's prose and the book's suspense. The Seattle Times praised Waiting for Sunrise's "wild-card factors" and the brisk narrative.

NPR overall panned the book, criticizing the "elaborate plots, Freudian subtexts and creaky mechanics" that "overwhelmed the more subtle and elemental task of good novel writing." The Guardian and The National also gave a negative review for Waiting for Sunrise, with The National saying that it was "clunky" and contained "soul-drainingly pedantic descriptions of furniture and clothing".
