= William Boyd (writer) =

Scottish novelist, short story writer, and screenwriter (born 1952)

William Boyd CBE FRSL
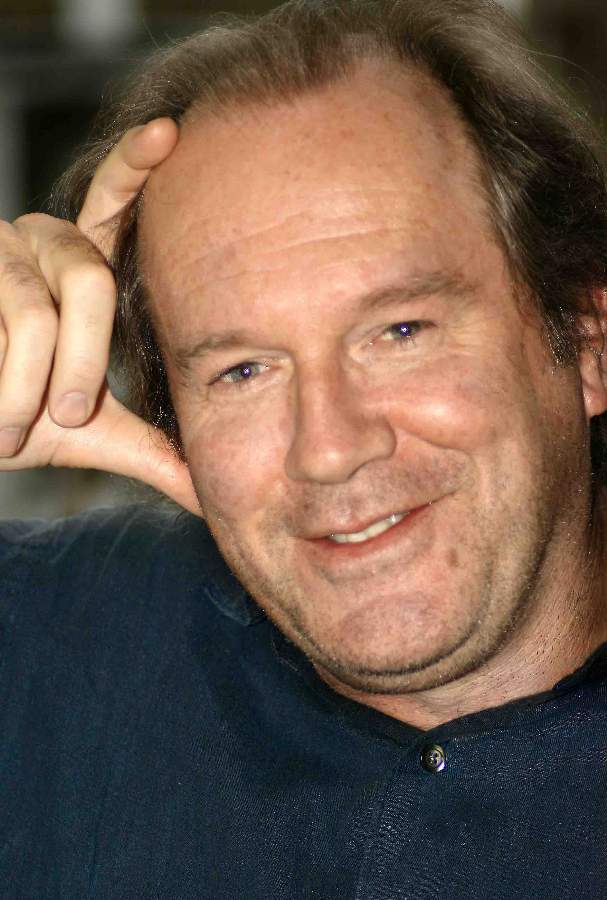
- Boyd in 2009
- Born: William Andrew Murray Boyd; 7 March 1952 (age 74); Accra, Gold Coast
- Education: University of Nice; University of Glasgow (M.A. Hons); Jesus College, Oxford (did not graduate)
- Occupations: Novelist; short story writer; screenwriter; film director
- Writing career
- Language: English
- Notable works: A Good Man in Africa; Any Human Heart
- Notable awards: Grand prix des lectrices de Elle
- Website: www.williamboyd.co.uk

William Andrew Murray Boyd CBE FRSL (born 7 March 1952) is a Scottish novelist, short story writer, screenwriter, and film director. He is best known for his novels, which include A Good Man in Africa (1981), Any Human Heart (2002), and Restless (2006), many of which have received critical acclaim and literary awards. Boyd has also written screenplays for film and television, including Chaplin (1992), and directed the World War I drama The Trench (1999).

His work is characterised by its narrative vitality and range, earning him numerous accolades including the Whitbread First Novel Award, the James Tait Black Memorial Prize, and the Costa Book Award. A number of his works are what he describes as "whole-life" novels which follow a protagonist through the highs and lows of a varied and often remarkable life. He regularly fuses fact with fiction and his lead characters encounter well-known historical figures. He was appointed Commander of the Order of the British Empire in 2005 for services to literature. John Self, writing for The Booker Prizes, described Boyd’s work as “vigorous, entertaining novels” produced by an “exceptionally fertile imagination,” and praised his fiction as “fully committed to his stories and characters.”

== Biography ==
Boyd was born in Accra, Gold Coast (present-day Ghana), to Scottish parents, both from Fife, and has two younger sisters. His father Alexander, a doctor specialising in tropical medicine, and Boyd's mother, who was a teacher, moved to the Gold Coast in 1950 to run the health clinic at the University College of the Gold Coast, Legon (now the University of Ghana). In the early 1960s, the family moved to western Nigeria, where Boyd's father held a similar position at the University of Ibadan. Boyd spent his early life in Ghana and Nigeria and, at the age of nine, went to a preparatory school and then to Gordonstoun school in Scotland, and, after that, to the University of Nice in France, followed by the University of Glasgow, where he gained an M.A. (Hons) in English & Philosophy, and finally Jesus College, Oxford. His father died of a rare disease when Boyd was 26.

Between 1980 and 1983, Boyd was a lecturer in English at St Hilda's College, Oxford, and it was while he was there that his first novel, A Good Man in Africa (1981), was published. He was also a television critic for the New Statesman between 1981 and 1983.

Boyd was appointed Commander of the Order of the British Empire in 2005 for services to literature. He is a Fellow of the Royal Society of Literature and an Officier de l'Ordre des Arts et des Lettres. He has been presented with honorary Doctorates in Literature from the universities of St. Andrews, Stirling, Glasgow, and Dundee and is an honorary fellow of Jesus College, Oxford. Boyd is a member of the Chelsea Arts Club.

Boyd met his wife Susan, a former editor and now a screenwriter, while they were both at Glasgow University. He has a house in Chelsea, London, and a farmhouse and vineyard (with its own appellation Château Pecachard) in Bergerac in the Dordogne in southwest France.

In August 2014, Boyd was one of 200 public figures who were signatories to a letter to The Guardian opposing Scottish independence in the run-up to September's referendum on that issue.

In March 2025, Boyd featured on BBC Radio 4's Desert Island Discs.

== Work ==
=== Novels ===
Boyd was selected in 1983 as one of the 20 "Best of Young British Novelists" in a promotion run by Granta magazine and the Book Marketing Council. Boyd's novels include: A Good Man in Africa, a study of a disaster-prone British diplomat operating in West Africa, for which he won the Whitbread Book award and Somerset Maugham Award in 1981; An Ice-Cream War, set against the background of the World War I campaigns in colonial East Africa, which won the John Llewellyn Rhys Prize and was shortlisted for the Booker Prize for Fiction in 1982; Brazzaville Beach, published in 1991, which follows a scientist researching chimpanzee behaviour in Africa; and Any Human Heart, written in the form of the journals of a fictitious male 20th-century British writer, which won the Prix Jean Monnet de Littérature Européenne and was longlisted for the Booker Prize in 2002. Restless, the tale of a young woman who discovers that her mother had been recruited as a spy during World War II, was published in 2006 and won the Novel of the Year award in the 2006 Costa Book Awards. Boyd's novel Waiting for Sunrise was published in 2012. Following Solo in 2013, Sweet Caress was published in 2015, the fourth novel Boyd has written from a woman's viewpoint.

==== Solo, the James Bond novel ====
In April 2012, Ian Fleming's estate announced that Boyd would write the next James Bond novel. The book, Solo, is set in 1969; it was published in the UK by Jonathan Cape in September 2013. Boyd used Bond creator Ian Fleming as a character in his novel Any Human Heart. Fleming recruits the book's protagonist, Logan Mountstuart, to British Naval Intelligence during World War II.

=== Short stories ===
Several collections of short stories by Boyd have been published, including On the Yankee Station (1981), The Destiny of Nathalie 'X' (1995), Fascination (2004) and The Dreams of Bethany Mellmoth (2017). In his introduction to The Dream Lover (2008), Boyd says that he believes the short story form to have been key to his evolution as a writer.

=== Screenplays ===
As a screenwriter, Boyd has written several feature film and television productions. The feature films include: Scoop (1987), adapted from the Evelyn Waugh novel; Stars and Bars (1988), adapted from Boyd's own novel; Mister Johnson (1990), based on the 1939 novel by Joyce Cary; Tune in Tomorrow (1990), based on the Mario Vargas Llosa novel Aunt Julia and the Scriptwriter; A Good Man in Africa (1994), also adapted from his own novel; The Trench (1999) an independent war film which he also directed; Man to Man (2005), a historical drama which was nominated for a Golden Bear award at the Berlin International Film Festival; and Sword of Honour, based on the Sword of Honour trilogy of novels by Evelyn Waugh. He was one of several writers who worked on Chaplin (1992). His television screenwriting credits include: Good and Bad at Games (1983), adapted from Boyd's short story about English public school life; Dutch Girls (1985); Armadillo (2001), adapted from his own novel; A Waste of Shame (2005) about Shakespeare's composition of his sonnets; Any Human Heart (2010), adapted from Boyd's own novel into a Channel 4 series starring Jim Broadbent, which won the 2011 Best Drama Serial BAFTA award; and Restless (2012), also adapted from his own novel. Boyd created the miniseries Spy City which aired in 2020.

=== Plays ===
Boyd adapted two Anton Chekhov short stories– "A Visit to Friends" and "My Life (The Story of a Provincial)" – to create the play Longing. Directed by Nina Raine and performed at London's Hampstead Theatre, the play starred Jonathan Bailey, Tamsin Greig, Natasha Little, Eve Ponsonby, John Sessions and Catrin Stewart. Previews began on 28 February 2013; the press night was on 7 March 2013. Boyd, who was theatre critic for the University of Glasgow student newspaper The Glasgow Guardian in the 1970s and has many actor friends, refers to his ambition to write a play as finally getting "this monkey off my back". A further play by Boyd, The Argument, described as a Strindberg-like take on human dynamics, was performed at Hampstead Theatre Downstairs in March 2016. Both plays were published by Methuen Drama (see Bibliography).

=== Non-fiction ===
Protobiography, an autobiographical work by Boyd that recalls his early childhood, was published initially in 1998 by Bridgewater Press in a limited edition. A paperback edition was published in 2005 by Penguin Books. A collection of Boyd's journalism and other non-fiction writing was published in 2005 as Bamboo.

== Nat Tate hoax ==
In 1998, Boyd published Nat Tate: An American Artist 1928–1960, which presents the paintings and tragic biography of a supposed New York-based 1950s abstract expressionist painter named Nat Tate, who actually never existed and was, along with his paintings, a creation of Boyd's. When the book was initially published, it was not revealed that it was a work of fiction, and some were duped by the hoax; it was launched at a lavish party, with excerpts read by David Bowie and Gore Vidal (both of whom were in on the joke), and a number of prominent members of the art world claimed to remember the artist. It caused quite a stir once the truth was revealed. The name "Nat Tate" is derived from the names of the two leading British art galleries: the National Gallery and the Tate Gallery. Boyd, who also paints, made artwork under the pseudonym of Nat Tate and sent it to auction, where it raised funds for an art charity. Nat Tate also appears in Any Human Heart, also by Boyd, with a wry footnote to the 1998 book.

== Bibliography ==
=== Novels ===
- A Good Man in Africa; Hamish Hamilton, 1981
- An Ice-Cream War; Hamish Hamilton, 1982
- Stars and Bars; Hamish Hamilton, 1984
- The New Confessions; Hamish Hamilton, 1987
- Brazzaville Beach; Sinclair-Stevenson, 1990
- The Blue Afternoon; Sinclair-Stevenson, 1993
- Armadillo; Hamish Hamilton, 1998
- Nat Tate: An American Artist 1928–1960; 21 Publishing, 1998
- Any Human Heart; Hamish Hamilton, 2002
- Restless; Bloomsbury, 2006
- Ordinary Thunderstorms; Bloomsbury, 2009
- Waiting for Sunrise; Bloomsbury, 2012
- Solo; Jonathan Cape, 2013
- Sweet Caress; Bloomsbury, 2015
- Love Is Blind; Viking Penguin, 2018
- Trio; Viking Penguin, 2020
- The Romantic; Viking Penguin, 2022
- Gabriel's Moon; Viking Penguin, 2024
- The Predicament; Viking Penguin, 2025
- Cold Sunset; Viking Penguin, 2026

==== Unpublished ====
- Against the Day
- Truelove at 29

=== Short-story collections ===
- On the Yankee Station; Hamish Hamilton, 1981
- The Destiny of Nathalie 'X'; Sinclair-Stevenson, 1995
- Fascination; Hamish Hamilton, 2004
- The Dream Lover; Bloomsbury, 2008. This combines the short story collections in On the Yankee Station (1981) and The Destiny of Nathalie 'X' (1995)
- The Dreams of Bethany Mellmoth; Viking Press, 2017. This includes "The Dreams of Bethany Mellmoth" (short story), first published in Notes from the Underground, 2007

=== Plays ===
- School Ties; Hamish Hamilton, 1985
- Longing (based on two Anton Chekhov stories); Methuen Drama, 2013
- The Argument; Methuen Drama, 2016

=== Screenplays ===
- Good and Bad at Games (1983)
- Dutch Girls (1985)
- Scoop (1987)
- Stars and Bars (1988)
- Mister Johnson (1990)
- Tune in Tomorrow (1990)
- Chaplin (1992)
- A Good Man in Africa (1994)
- The Trench (1999)
- Armadillo (2001)
- Sword of Honour (2001)
- Man to Man (2005)
- A Waste of Shame (2005)
- Any Human Heart (2010)
- Restless (2012)
- Spy City (2020)

=== Radio ===
- The McFeggan Offensive (2020)
- The State of the Art (2023)
- The Jura Affair (2025)

=== Non-fiction ===
- Protobiography; Bridgewater Press, 1998 (limited edition)
- Bamboo; Hamish Hamilton, 2005

== Literary prizes and awards ==
- 1981 Whitbread First Novel Award for A Good Man in Africa
- 1982 Mail on Sunday/John Llewellyn Rhys Prize for An Ice-Cream War
- 1982 Somerset Maugham Award for A Good Man in Africa
- 1983 Selected as one of the 20 "Best of Young British Novelists" by Granta magazine and the Book Marketing Council
- 1990 James Tait Black Memorial Prize (for fiction) for Brazzaville Beach
- 1991 McVitie's Prize for Scottish Writer of the Year for Brazzaville Beach
- 1993 The Sunday Express Book of the Year for The Blue Afternoon
- 1995 Los Angeles Times Book Prize (Fiction) for The Blue Afternoon
- 2003 Prix Jean Monnet de Littérature Européenne for Any Human Heart
- 2003 Grand prix des lectrices de Elle for À livre ouvert, French language edition of Any Human Heart
- 2004 Shortlisted for International Dublin Literary Award for Any Human Heart
- 2006 Costa Book Award for Restless
- 2007 Shortlisted for British Book Awards Richard & Judy Best Read of the Year for Restless
- 2016 Shortlisted for Walter Scott Prize for Sweet Caress

== Sources ==
- Boyd, William (2008). "Author's introduction". The Dream Lover. Bloomsbury Publishing. ISBN 9780747592297.
