= On the Yankee Station =

1981 short story collection by William Boyd

- First edition (UK)
- Author: William Boyd
- Cover artist: Craig Dodd
- Language: English
- Publisher: Hamish Hamilton (UK); William Morrow (US)
- Publication date: 1981 (UK), 1982 (US)
- Publication place: United Kingdom
- Media type: Print & eBook
- Pages: 186
- ISBN: 0-241-10426-2
- Dewey Decimal: 823'.914[F]

On the Yankee Station is a short story collection by William Boyd. His first novel, A Good Man in Africa was published in 1981; this collection was published later that same year, and includes two stories featuring Morgan Leafy, the anti-hero of the novel. The title comes from one of the stories which is set at Yankee Station, an operations centre for the US Navy during the Vietnam War. The collection has been a set text for English A-Level.

== Stories ==
Stories appearing in the first edition :

- "Killing Lizards" – In Africa, Gavin the son of the university chemistry professor and his friends kill dozens of lizards on the campus which they regard as vermin. Whilst hunting them they come across his mother and a man.
- "Not Yet, Jayette" – In Los Angeles an out-of-work actor reminisces over his past and makes plans for the future.
- "Bizarre Situations" – a man talks of the problems he experiences after drastic surgery for epilepsy leaves him with a split-brain and leads to the suspicion of murder.
- "Hardly Ever" – At a Scottish boys' public school the adolescent boys sign up to sing in HMS Pinafore with the promise that their counterparts, the girls from local grammar school are 'mad for sex'.
- "Next Boat from Douala" – Morgan Leafy (the anti-hero of A Good Man in Africa) is spending his last few days in Nkongsamba (before departing via boat from Douala) when he finds he has contracted gonorrhoea from a prostitute.
- "Gifts" – Edward arrives in Nice to study French and is struck by the generosity of the people he meets.
- "My Girl in Skin-Tight Jeans" – On the California coast near San Luis Obispo the narrator's infatuation with the girl of the title ends in tragedy.
- "Histoire Vache" – In Villers-Bocage in Normandy, a young English teenager, Eric loses his virginity to an older Marguerite, who works at the abattoir and is used by everybody.
- "On the Yankee Station" – the title story, set during the Vietnam War in which Lt Larry Pfitz on his first mission loses his Phantom shortly after takeoff from an aircraft carrier on Yankee Station. Pfitz, a violent, angry young man with a sadistic slant, blames a member of his ground crew and everybody's scapegoat, Arthur Lydecker, whom he demotes to catapult maintenance, a gruesome job. A chain of unrelated events drive Lydecker to exact his revenge.
- "Bat-Girl!" – She works in a travelling fair where her act involves being licked by a large bat whilst wearing a bikini.
- "Love Hurts" – In California, successful executive Lamar falls in love and marries out-of-work actress Cherylle but the marriage soon breaks down.
- "The Coup" – After his three-year posting, Morgan Leafy heads from to Nkongsamba to Yaoundé airport to return to Britain, only to find on his arrival that there has been a coup.
- "Long Short Story" – Metafiction concerning the writing of a short story.

=== Additional stories ===
The following stories appear in later editions :

- "The Care and Attention of Swimming Pools" – the unnamed narrator maintains swimming pools in Los Angeles and talks of his clients, his girlfriend Noelle-Joy and the disastrous ending to his career.
- "Alpes Maritimes" – A sequel to the story "Gifts", Edward now has a girlfriend, Ulricke, but instead wants her twin sister Anneliese, but has competition from Steve.
- "Extracts from the Journal of Flying Officer J." – set in rural England during a fictitious World War I-like conflict.

== Reception ==
- "Formidably accomplished ... bursting at the seams with raw ability" – The Spectator
- "His writing, with nods in the direction of Borges and Nabokov combines violence, comedy and experiment ... an impressively varied collection" – Time Out
- "Crisp, wry, energetic ... the author slips with ease from one narrative manner to another, reproducing the exact tones of a girl in a sideshow or an articulate psychopath ... nothing in this collection is less than diverting" – The Times Literary Supplement
