= Decorticator =

Plant processing machine

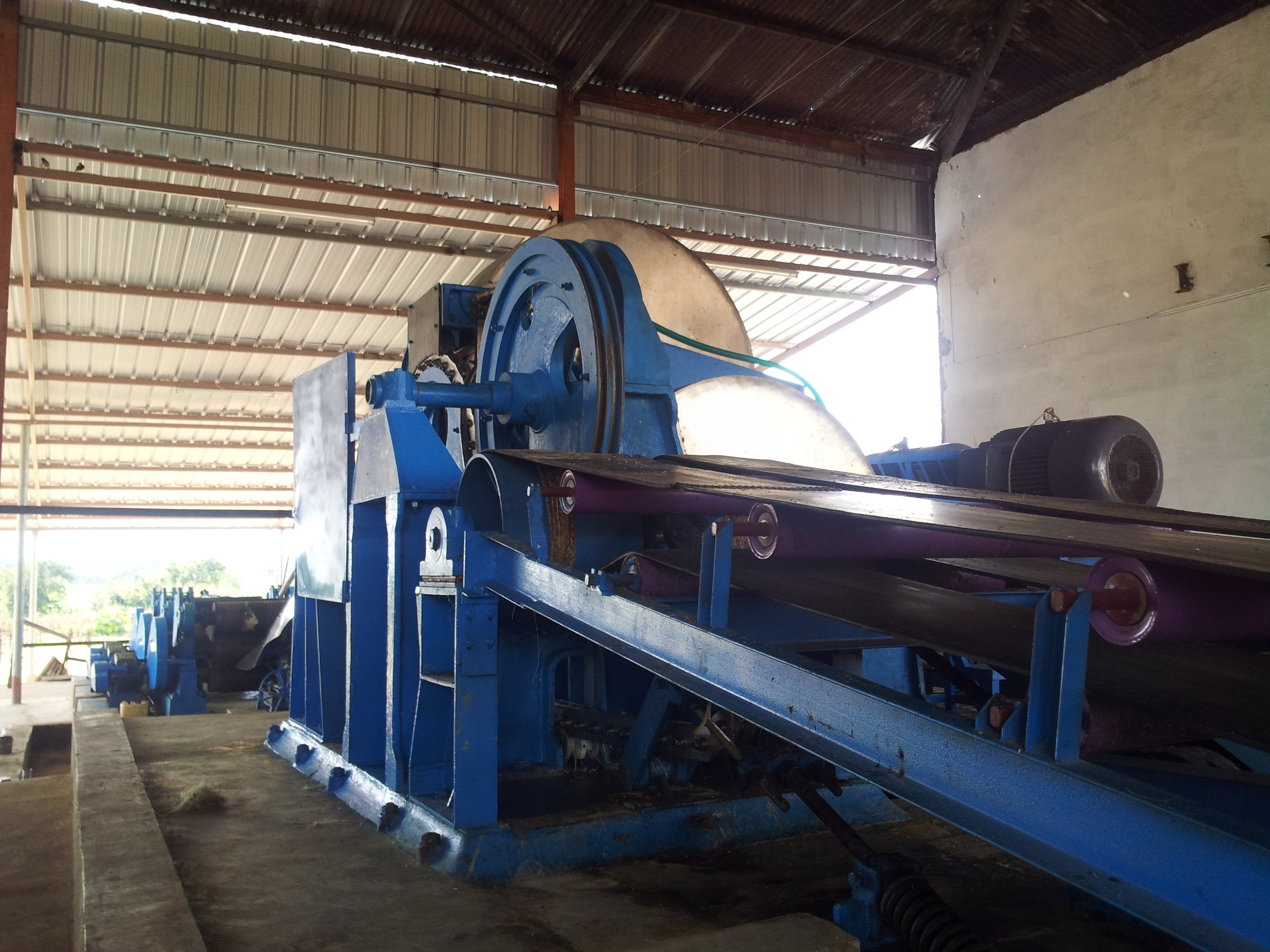
Fully-automatic decorticator

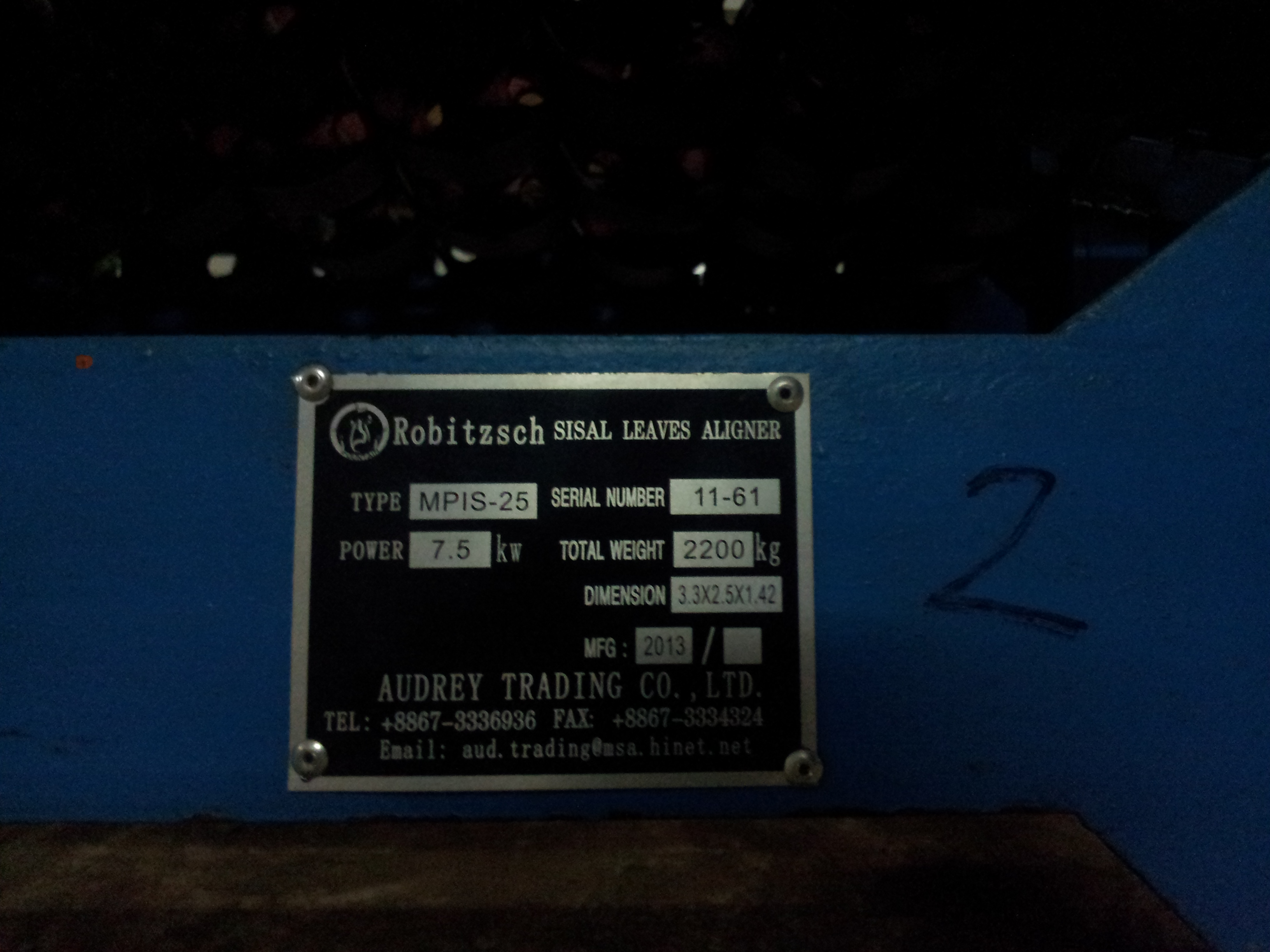
Robitzsch sisal decorticator

A decorticator (from Latin: cortex, bark) is a machine for stripping the skin, bark, or rind off nuts, wood, plant stalks, grain, etc., in preparation for further processing.

== History ==
In 1933, a farmer named Bernagozzi from Bologna manufactured a machine called a "scavezzatrice", a decorticator for hemp. A working hemp decorticator from 1890, manufactured in Germany, is preserved in a museum in Bologna.

In Italy, the"scavezzatrice" faded in the 1950s because of monopolisation from fossil fuel, paper interests, synthetic materials and from other less profitable crops.

Many types of decorticators have been developed since 1890.

In 1919, George Schlichten received a U.S. patent on his improvements of the decorticator for treating fiber bearing plants. Schlichten failed to find investors for production of his decorticator and died in 1923, a broken man. His business was revived a decade after death in 1933.

Newer, high-speed kinematic decorticators, use a different mechanism, enabling separation into three streams; bast fibre, hurd, and green microfiber.

== Current usage ==
In some decorticators, the operation is "semi-automatic", featuring several stops during operation, while more modern systems, such as high-speed kinematic decorticators, are fully automatic.

There are companies who produce and sell decorticators for different crops.
