= Armadillo (novel) =

1998 novel by William Boyd

Armadillo: A Novel
- First edition
- Author: William Boyd
- Language: English
- Publisher: Hamish Hamilton (UK); Knopf (US)
- Publication date: 1998
- Publication place: United Kingdom
- Pages: 310
- ISBN: 0-241-13928-7
- OCLC: 38549989
- Preceded by: The Blue Afternoon (1993)
- Followed by: Nat Tate: An American Artist 1928–1960 (1998)

Armadillo is William Boyd's seventh novel, published in 1998. It was the first of his novels to be based in Britain. Boyd also wrote the screenplay for a BBC/A&E television adaptation in 2001.

== Plot introduction ==
The story concerns Lorimer Black, a successful loss adjuster. His original name is Milomre Blocj and he comes from a family of Transnistrian gypsies who arrived in London in 1957 and set up an import-export business linked to Eastern Europe. They now run a taxi cab firm and are always borrowing money off Milo (as they still call him). Lorimer suffers from insomnia and spends many nights at the "Institute for Lucid Dreaming" in search for a cure. He collects antique helmets, listens to African music and is having an affair with Stella Bull, the owner of a scaffolding company. The book includes extracts taken from Lorimer's journal The Book of Transfiguration, in which he philosophizes on his situation and quotes from Gérard de Nerval.

Hogg, Lorimer's overbearing boss, describes his profession thus: "people turn to insurance to remove uncertainty from areas of their lives. Insurance companies turn to loss adjusters to put uncertainty into insurance, and thus reintroduce uncertainty to insured people."

The narrative itself begins when Lorimer turns up at a routine business appointment only to find the man he was to meet has hanged himself. From then on his already complicated life begins to unravel as he falls in love with Flavia Malinervo, an unhappily married actress; is assigned to investigate a case of suspected insurance fraud in which a colleague, Torquil Helvoir-Jayne, is implicated; and suffers the death of his father.

== Reception ==
According to the complete review, reviews were mixed. There was "no critical consensus: some loved the writing, some thought it was terrible. The same with the meandering story. Only consensus: Boyd was not being ambitious enough, not using his talents to the fullest".

- Caroline Boucher in The Observer writes "In Armadillo William Boyd has not only written a gripping novel. He also pulls off the coup of making loss adjusting exciting... with good prose, a plot that draws you along and is both unsettling and at times comic".
- Richard Bernstein in The New York Times praises Boyd's storytelling talents in "this entertaining novel, which gives us one of the more likable, lost and perplexed central characters yet to appear in his oeuvre."
- In contrast though The Economist complained: "You expect an intelligent, thoughtful, and interesting thriller; unfortunately, the expectations are subverted by three inadequacies, surprising in a writer whose previous work has generally been greeted with acclaim and even delight. What is wrong? Well, chiefly, the plotting, the characters and the writing."

== Television adaptation ==
The novel was adapted into a three-part BBC/A&E television series shown in September 2001 with a screenplay by the author. It was directed by Howard Davies and produced by Sue Birtwistle.

=== Cast ===
- James Frain as Lorimer Black
- Catherine McCormack as Flavia Malinverno
- Stephen Rea as Hogg
- Hugh Bonneville as Torquil Helvoir-Jayne
- James Fox as Sir Simon Sheriffmuir
