= The Argument (2016 play) =

2016 play by William Boyd

- Cover of Methuen Drama edition, 2016
- Original language: English
- Written by: William Boyd
- Characters: Pip and Meredith (a married couple), Tony, Chloe, Jane, Frank
- Genre: Drama

Premiere
- Date: 3 May 2016
- Place: Hampstead Theatre Downstairs, London

The Argument is a 2016 play by the Scottish writer William Boyd. Its premiere production, directed by Anna Ledwich, ran at the Hampstead Theatre Downstairs in London from 3 March to 2 April 2016.

The playscript was published by Bloomsbury Publishing under its Methuen Drama imprint in March 2016.
