= A Good Man in Africa =

- Directed by: Bruce Beresford
- Screenplay by: William Boyd
- Based on: A Good Man in Africa by William Boyd
- Produced by: John Fiedler; Mark Tarlov; Bruce Beresford
- Starring: Colin Friels; Joanne Whalley-Kilmer; Sean Connery; John Lithgow; Louis Gossett Jr.; Diana Rigg
- Cinematography: Andrzej Bartkowiak
- Edited by: Jim Clark
- Music by: John Du Prez
- Production companies: Polar Entertainment; Capitol Films; South African Breweries; Southern Sun
- Distributed by: Gramercy Pictures (United States); United International Pictures (United Kingdom); Capitol Films (Overseas)
- Release dates: 9 September 1994 (USA); 25 November 1994 (UK)
- Running time: 94 minutes
- Countries: United States; United Kingdom; South Africa
- Language: English
- Budget: $18.5 million
- Box office: $2,308,390

A Good Man in Africa is a 1994 comedy-drama film, based on William Boyd's 1981 novel A Good Man in Africa and directed by Bruce Beresford. The film starred Colin Friels, Sean Connery, John Lithgow, Joanne Whalley, Diana Rigg and Louis Gossett Jr.

== Plot ==
Morgan Leafy is a British diplomat living in Kinjanja, an African nation which has recently become independent from British rule. Arthur Fanshawe, a new diplomat eager to leave Africa, learns that Kinjanja sits on top of a huge oil reserve. Unfortunately, Morgan is too preoccupied with alcohol and women to know what to do with the oil. To make matters worse, a woman is struck by lightning on the British compound, creating a tense political situation with the Kinjanja government.

== Cast ==
- Colin Friels as Morgan Leafy
- Joanne Whalley-Kilmer as Celia Adekunle
- Sean Connery as Dr. Alex Murray
- John Lithgow as Arthur Fanshawe
- Louis Gossett Jr. as Prof. Sam Adekunle
- Diana Rigg as Chloe Fanshawe
- Maynard Eziashi as Friday, Leafy's Houseman
- Sarah-Jane Fenton as Priscilla Fanshawe
- Jackie Mofokeng as Hazel
- Themba Ndaba as Kojo
- David Phetoe as Isaiah

== Production ==
In July 1992 Beresford wrote to his colleague and friend Sue Milliken he had Boyd's draft and was "passionately keen to make" the movie. "It's a pretty good first draft."

In October 1992 Beresford told Milliken he was trying to seek finance for the film as an alternative to another project Bessie but was "so far getting rejections even with the proposed cast of Kenneth Branagh, Sean Connery, Michael Caine and Danny Glover! Times are tough and A Good Man in Africa is perceived here as a ‘foreign movie."

Beresford eventually raised finance for the movie. In June 1993 Beresford wrote the film "hasn't turned out at all well. Tm not sure why, but the story never seems to get going and the characters are not at all interesting. The only excuse I can make is that all the production problems combined so that I aimed only at getting through the film and forgot to direct it properly." In January 1994 Beresford called it "probably my worst film".

In November 1994 Beresford reflected, "I knew when I was directing it that it couldn't possibly work. For some odd reason the script read well but couldn't be made to play, I think because it actually had no coherent story and no detail to the characterisations. The novel is the same but it's stylishly written and it doesnt matter. Boyd's comic novels are as hard to film as Evelyn Waugh’s - which have never been done successfully."

== Reception ==
The movie received mixed to poor reviews. Roger Ebert said that he felt uncomfortable during the film but praised the performances of Connery, Lithgow and Gossett. Hal Hinson of The Washington Post said that although the film "held the possibility of being a welcome departure from the ordinary [...] ordinary is what it rises to at its best." Janet Maslin of The New York Times opined that "a good book is the basis for "A Good Man in Africa," but its mordant humor has curdled badly on the screen," adding:

Although William Boyd, the author of these gimlet-eyed observations of colonial antics in Africa, adapted his own novel and also served as one of the film's producers, "A Good Man in Africa" now has none of the cunning that it had on the page.

Film critic Jeffrey Lyons of Sneak Previews ranked the film number 6 on his list of the worst films of 1994.

The film's director, Bruce Beresford, did not remember the film fondly:

God, that was horrible. That was the worst film experience I ever had. It was cast wrong, the crew was all strange. We were filming in the wrong place. We filmed in South Africa, it was set in West Africa. Which is like shooting in Alaska when it’s set in New Orleans. And I realized that although the novel that it’s based on is terribly funny, it was very anecdotal. It had no narrative. I think on about the second day I realized it was never going to work, because the scenes don’t link. I thought, “I’m sunk! I’m never gonna get out.”

Commenting retrospectively in 2023, William Boyd said of the film:

What did make a difference is that the comedy vacillated between broad and deadpan, between something over the top and something quite dark and deadpan, and you can't do that on film otherwise you confuse the audience: is it a belly laugh or is it a knowing chuckle?"

== DVD release ==
Focus Features released an Amazon.com exclusive DVD of the film on 11 January 2010.

== Notes ==
- Beresford, Bruce; Milliken, Sue (2016). There's A Fax From Bruce: Edited Correspondence Between Bruce Beresford & Sue Milliken 1989 1996. Currency Press.
