= Solo (Boyd novel) =

James Bond continuation novel by William Boyd

- First edition cover
- Author: William Boyd
- Series: James Bond
- Genre: Spy fiction
- Publisher: Jonathan Cape
- Publication date: 26 September 2013
- Publication place: United Kingdom
- Media type: Print (hardcover, e-book, audio)
- Pages: 336 pp (first edition, hardback)
- ISBN: 978-0-224-09747-5 (first edition, hardback)

Solo is a James Bond continuation novel written by William Boyd. It was published in the UK by Jonathan Cape on 26 September 2013 in hardback, e-book and audio editions, and in the US by HarperCollins on 8 October 2013.

The plot centres on Bond's mission to the civil war in the fictional country of Zanzarim—a thinly veiled version of Biafra during the Nigerian Civil War—where he meets the local MI6 contact, Efua Blessing Ogilvy-Grant, and a Rhodesian mercenary, Kobus Breed. After being shot by Ogilvy-Grant, Bond tracks both people to Washington on a revenge mission, finally establishing that Breed is trafficking heroin into the US.

Boyd closely based his version of the Bond character on Ian Fleming's, and eschewed any of the film versions. The novel is set in 1969—six years after Fleming's last work was set—and Bond is 45 years old. Boyd was raised in Nigeria and used his experiences during the civil war to provide the location for the novel. He has been a Bond fan since his youth and, in preparation for writing the novel he read all the Bond stories in chronological order. It took 18 months to write the novel, with some friction between Boyd and the Fleming estate over the portrayal of Bond.

Solo received mixed reviews, with a number of critics pointing to the convoluted and unstirring plot. Other critics saw the book as being equal with, or superior to, Fleming's stronger novels. The book sold well, appearing in the top ten-selling book lists in the UK.

== Plot ==
After celebrating his 45th birthday alone at The Dorchester, Bond is sent to Zanzarim to bring a speedy end to the civil war in the country which has seen the delta region of the country split to form the Democratic Republic of Dahum. Before leaving for Africa, Bond visits Gabriel Adeka—the rebel leader's brother—who runs AfricaKIN, a London-based charity who send aid to Dahumni children; Gabriel tells Bond that he is not in contact with his brother Solomon, as the pair have fallen out.

On his arrival in Zanzarim, Bond is aided by a local agent who introduces herself as Efua Blessing Ogilvy-Grant. The two travel from the capital city to the rebel enclave, but are attacked shortly before reaching their destination and taken captive by Kobus Breed, a mercenary assisting the rebels. The group are attacked on their return journey and Ogilvy-Grant goes missing in the confusion, while Bond escapes.

Bond proceeds to the enclave, where he is met by Breed, who accepts Bond's cover as a journalist. Bond meets Solomon Adeka and realises that the leader will shortly die of cancer: his mission to kill Adeka is needless. Bond sees supply flights of arms and equipment coming into the country, all funded by billionaire Hulbert Linck; the aeroplanes all show the AfricaKIN name on the fuselage. When Adeka dies a few days later, Bond tries to leave the country on one of the supply flights, but is confronted by Breed and Blessing, who both shoot him and leave him to die.

Bond is saved by a journalist he befriended and returns to the UK, where he spends time in a military hospital. After discharging himself, he decides to go on a revenge mission against Breed and Ogilvy-Grant. Discovering AfricaKIN has relocated to Washington DC, Bond travels to the US and tracks down both of them at the AfricaKIN offices. While conducting surveillance against the company, Bond is briefly detained by Brigham Leiter—nephew of Felix—of the CIA, who explains Ogilvy-Grant also works for the CIA.

Bond meets Ogilvy-Grant, who assures him that she shot to wound him in order that Breed would not shoot them both. The following day Bond watches a mercy flight bringing in maimed and injured Zanzarimi children; he dines alone and returns to his hotel to find that Breed has killed Ogilvy-Grant.

Bond attacks the house where Breed is staying with the children, and incapacitates the mercenary, leaving him for dead. He establishes that the children are being used as drug mules to smuggle raw heroin into the country and locates Solomon Adeka, who had not been killed in Africa, but been turned into a heroin addict in order to control him. Adeka's older brother had been killed in London, ensuring Solomon became chief of the tribe whose lands held massive amounts of oil: as he was an addict, these rights were signed away in favour of Hulbert Linck. Linck was killed by the CIA during the raid on the house.

== Characters and themes ==
The central character of the novel is James Bond, the fictional MI6 agent created by Ian Fleming. The author, William Boyd modelled his version of the character on Fleming's version, which Boyd identified as being very different from the version seen in the films. Solo is set in 1969—six years after Fleming's last work was set—and the novel begins with Bond celebrating his 45th birthday. Boyd altered aspects of the character, making him "an older, wiser Bond"'; while having coffee on the King's Road, Bond's "advancing age lends an undertone of poignancy to his almost detached observation of the bra-less, mini-skirted cavalcade". Boyd's version of Bond is "more impulsive, less emotionally guarded, and also more sadistic" than Fleming's, and he has the facility for extreme violence. According to The Sunday Times, Bond's "casual sexism has gone, to be replaced by a flaring lust that teeters on the edge of being out of control, and has to be reined in".

The primary antagonist of the novel is Kobus Breed, a mercenary with a disfigured face and a permanently weeping eye who had previously served with the Rhodesian Light Infantry in Matabeleland; Olen Steinhauer, writing in The New York Times thinks the scarred villain to be "an obligatory nod toward the requirements of the Bond formula". Some writers are unimpressed with Breed; Robert Crampton of The Sunday Times thinks that the character "feels more like a henchman than a proper power-crazed villain. He has menace, but no ambition. You wait for the evil genius to turn up—but he never does", while David Sexton in the London Evening Standard thinks the character "lacks charisma", and David Connett in the Sunday Express considers him "a colourless character in comparison with factual and fictional counterparts". Steinhauer also thought that the novel's villains were realistic, "motivated by simple greed yet clever enough to be legitimately dangerous". There are two main female characters in Solo—a horror film actress, Bryce Fitzjohn and the local MI6 contact Efua Blessing Ogilvy-Grant; rather like many of Fleming's female characters, both are "determined females who are not to be patronised by Bond".

The main theme of the novel is revenge. Bond is stopped from leaving Zanzarim by Breed and subsequently shot and badly wounded by Ogilvy-Grant; he tracks down the pair to Washington and attempts to get his revenge. According to The Sunday Business Post, "this is where the author comes into his own, along with our hero, and it's all taken up a notch."

== Background ==
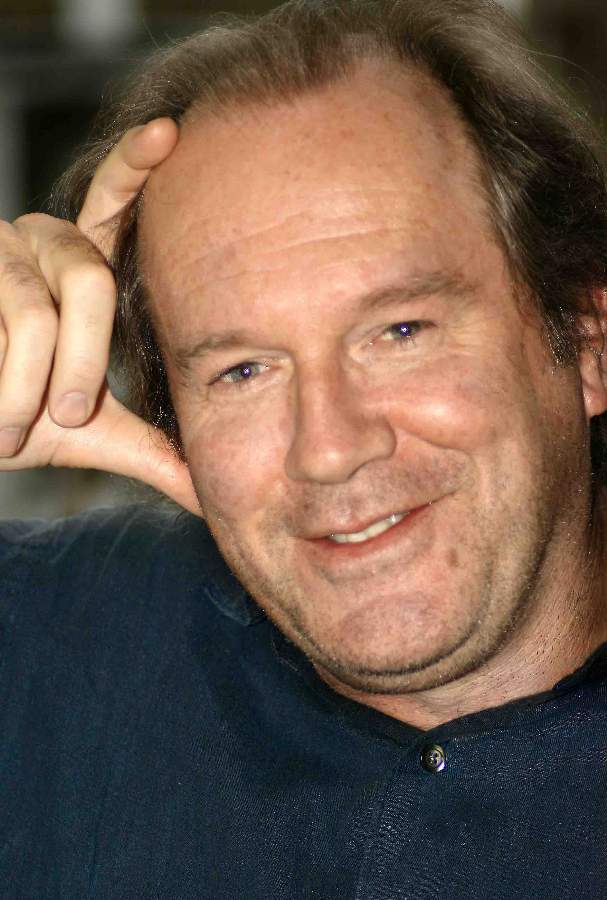
William Boyd, author of Solo, in 2009

On 31 March 2012 Boyd announced at the Oxford Literary Festival that he was working on a novel set in Africa. Boyd had lived in Nigeria—"where his mother was a teacher and his father a doctor"—during the Nigerian Civil War, which "had a profound effect on him." On 11 April 2012 the Fleming estate announced that Boyd would write a Bond novel to follow Jeffery Deaver's 2011 novel Carte Blanche. The civil war, over the attempted secession by Biafra from Nigeria, was the location for Solo, although Boyd renamed this as the fictional Zanzarim.

On 15 April 2013 Boyd announced the book's title at the London Book Fair. The announcement was part of the "Author of the Day" event at the English Pen Literary Café. Selected press were invited to the event and were given a brief opportunity to question Boyd about the book's title. Boyd believes the short title is "strikingly apt" for the novel. He remarked that "titles are very important" to him, and that as soon as he "wrote down Solo on a sheet of paper I saw its potential. Not only did it fit the theme of the novel perfectly, it's also a great punchy word, instantly and internationally comprehensible, graphically alluring and, as an extra bonus, it's strangely Bondian in the sense that we might be subliminally aware of the '00' of '007' lurking just behind those juxtaposed O's of SOLO".

For background Boyd read all the Bond stories in chronological order; and had researched Fleming and the literary Bond's background. Boyd was a child when his father introduced him to Fleming's works. As a result, Boyd found himself also becoming fascinated with Ian Fleming. He told reporters that he was interested in Bond as a human being. "Bond is not just a superhero. He has flaws, he has weaknesses, he makes mistakes. ... That was Fleming's genius." The novel is set in 1969 when Bond is 45; Boyd intentionally picked the year, further adding that "there are no gimmicks, it's a real spy story." Boyd criticised how the filmmakers have portrayed Bond onscreen as a "cartoon character"; he also believes that Bond should be "troubled and a massive boozer." The novel reflects Boyd's view, where Bond "drinks enough to float a boat. He drinks so much you wonder that he ever has the time or inclination to do anything else".

The writing process took 18 months and Boyd was required to run synopses and drafts through the Fleming estate, a process he described as "benevolent surveillance". The process was not always smooth, and the author had a number of arguments with the estate over the portrayal of Bond: "they were concerned about Bond being seen as an assassin, but I would argue Bond is sent on an assassination mission in at least four Fleming books", with further issues over Bond's relationship with M.

Boyd described writing the book as "tremendous fun" and a "once in a lifetime challenge", but admitted that he had to take it "really, really seriously." After completing the writing process, Boyd commented that he did not "attempt to write a pastiche Fleming novel ... it's my own voice; I'm dealing with things and subjects I am interested in ... it is very much my novel; it just features these characters invented by Fleming."

== Release and reception ==
Solo was launched on 25 September 2013 at the Dorchester Hotel. Seven copies of the book were signed by Boyd, were collected by seven Jensen Interceptors and were then flown by British Airways to Amsterdam, Edinburgh, Zurich, Los Angeles, Delhi, Cape Town and Sydney. The book was released into the shops on 26 September 2013; the hardcover book was published by Jonathan Cape and was 336 pages long and cost £18.99. An e-book edition was also released, as was an audio book, narrated by Dominic West. The hardcover edition was released in the US by HarperCollins on 8 October 2013 for $26.99.

The jacket was designed by Suzanne Dean, the creative director at Random House. The book's dust jacket featured die-cut bullet holes, while the hardcover binding featured "burn marks" under the holes. Dean commented that she took inspiration from the 1960s in her design, and was influenced by the graphic designers Saul Bass, Paul Rand and Alvin Lustig.

=== Reviews ===
The novel sold nearly 9,000 copies in its first week, although that was 48% down on Deaver's Carte Blanche, and even further behind Sebastian Faulks's 2008 book Devil May Care. By 10 October the London Evening Standard listed the books as number one on the London's Bestsellers list, and in the two weeks of 5 and 12 October 2013 was shown as number 3 in the UK fiction best sellers list, dropping to fourth place on 19 October 2013.

Solo received mixed reviews. A number of reviewers, including Robert McCrum in The Guardian, David Mills in The Sunday Times and Olen Steinhauer in The New York Times, all consider the book to be equal with, or superior to, Fleming's stronger novels. Steinhauer writes that it was Boyd's description of the Zanzarim civil war that gave the novel its "greatest power", and that Boyd performs a "neat metafictional trick" by connecting Bond's wartime experiences with 30 Assault Unit—a British Commando unit developed by Fleming. Writing in The Guardian, Richard Williams saw Boyd using some similar phrasing of Fleming's, while also including "gestures of independence" with his own ideas. The result, Williams considers, is a story that "entertains far more than it exasperates".

Much of the criticism about the novel focuses on the plot; Jon Stock, writing in The Daily Telegraph, thought that although Boyd used details in the same way Fleming did that would appeal to Bond aficionados, the book was based on "a curiously unstirring plot", which was also "convoluted". The National's Nick Leech also noted the use of details, but considered that this led to "a pedantic, meandering narrative" which led to "an underwhelming finale". Writing in the London Evening Standard, David Sexton agreed, calling the book a "rather inattentive novel", that was a "lame outing" in the Bond canon. David Connett was another who saw flaws in the novel, calling it "anaemic stuff", although it was "far superior to the last effort to breathe life into a Bond novel by Jeffery Deaver".

== Adaptations ==
On 30 September 2013 Solo was the chosen work for Book at Bedtime on BBC Radio 4. The work was read by Paterson Joseph; the book was adapted by Libby Spurrier and was broadcast in ten episodes.

== See also ==
- Outline of James Bond
