= Outline of cannabis =

Overview of and topical guide to cannabis

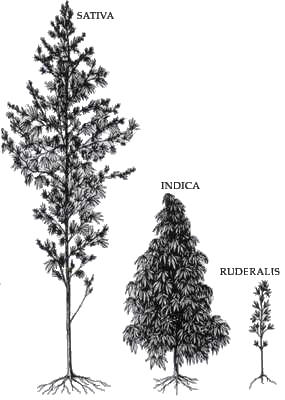
Three varieties of cannabis

The following outline is provided as an overview of and topical guide to the plant Cannabis sativa and its relatives Cannabis indica and Cannabis ruderalis, the drug cannabis (drug) and the industrial product hemp.

== Botany ==
- Cannabis indica
- Cannabis ruderalis
- Cannabis sativa
- Autoflowering cannabis
- Cannabis strains

== Economy ==
Cannabis industry

- List of cannabis companies
- Cannabis in the restaurant industry

== Cannabis drug ==
Cannabis (drug)

- Cannabis consumption
  - Adult lifetime cannabis use by country
  - Cannabis edible
    - Bhang
    - Cannabis tea
    - Dawamesc
  - Cannabis smoking
  - Vaporizer (inhalation device) § Cannabis vaporizers
- Chemicals
  - Cannabinoids
    - Cannabichromene (CBC)
    - Cannabidiol (CBD)
    - Cannabigerol (CBG)
    - Cannabicyclol (CBL)
    - Cannabinol (CBN)
    - Cannabidivarin (CBDV)
    - Cannabinodiol (CBDL)
    - Tetrahydrocannabinol (THC)
    - Tetrahydrocannabinol-C4 (THC-C4)
    - Tetrahydrocannabivarin (THCV, THV)
    - Synthetic cannabinoids
  - Terpenes
    - Humulene
    - Limonene
    - Linalool
    - Myrcene
    - alpha-Pinene
- Conversion of CBD to THC
- Nonmedical
  - Cannabis (drug)
- Medical
  - Medical cannabis
    - Medical Marijuana Dispensary Registration Portal
- Preparations and extracts
  - Kief
  - Charas
  - Cannabis flower essential oil
  - Tincture of cannabis
  - Hash oil
  - Hashish

== Culture ==
Cannabis culture

- Festivals and events
  - Category:Cannabis events (main in lieu of list)
  - 420 (cannabis culture)
  - Cannabis Cup
  - Hempfest (disambiguation), several events
- Media
  - Cannabis advertising
    - Cannabis advertising in Denver
  - Digital
    - Category:Cannabis websites
    - Weedtuber
  - Film and television
    - Category:Films about cannabis
    - Category:Television episodes about cannabis
    - Category:Television series about cannabis
    - Cannabis exploitation films:
      - Assassin of Youth
      - Marihuana
      - Reefer Madness
      - She Shoulda Said No!
    - List of films containing frequent marijuana use
    - Public service announcements
      - Stoner Sloth
    - Stoner film
    - Stoner TV
  - List of cannabis hoaxes
  - Music
    - Category:Cannabis music
  - Print
    - List of books about cannabis
    - List of cannabis columns
    - Cannabis cookbook
    - Category:Books about cannabis
    - Category:Plays about cannabis
    - Category:Games about cannabis
    - Category:Cannabis magazines
- Religion
  - Category:Cannabis and religion
  - Entheogenic use of cannabis

== Effects ==
Effects of cannabis

- Cannabis and impaired driving
- Cannabis-induced psychotic disorder
- Cannabis use disorder
- Long-term effects of cannabis
- Occupational health concerns of cannabis use
- Scromiting

== Farming and production ==
Cannabis cultivation

- Category:Cannabis seed banks
- List of hemp diseases
- Cannabis irradiation
- Cannabis product testing
- Extraction
  - Ice extraction
  - Rosin (heat)
  - Liquid–liquid extraction (aka solvent extraction) (see also Hash oil)
  - Supercritical fluid extraction (CO_{2})
- Indoor production
  - Aeroponics
  - Grow house
  - Grow light
  - Hydroponics
- Hemp in the United States
  - Hemp in Kentucky
  - Hemp in North Carolina
  - Hemp in Washington (state)
  - Hemp research and production activities
    - Arlington Experimental Farm
    - Farmington
    - Wisconsin Agricultural Experiment Station

== Laws and politics ==
- General
  - Legality of cannabis
  - Timeline of cannabis law
  - Cannabis drug testing
- Cannabis rights
  - List of cannabis rights organizations
- International law
  - Cannabis and international law (main)
  - Single Convention on Narcotic Drugs
  - United Nations Convention Against Illicit Traffic in Narcotic Drugs and Psychotropic Substances
- National law
  - Canada:
    - Cannabis Act
    - Cannabis in Canada
    - Cannabis and the Canadian military
  - Germany:
    - Betäubungsmittelgesetz
    - Cannabis in Germany
    - Entwurf eines Cannabiskontrollgesetzes
    - German cannabis control bill
  - Japan: Cannabis Control Law
  - Malta: Cannabis in Malta
  - United Kingdom: Cannabis classification in the United Kingdom
  - United States:
    - Cole Memorandum
    - Congressional Cannabis Caucus
    - Legality of cannabis by U.S. jurisdiction
      - Cannabis on American Indian reservations
    - Legalization of non-medical cannabis in the United States
    - Marihuana Tax Act of 1937
    - Cannabis and the United States military
    - Removal of cannabis from Schedule I of the Controlled Substances Act
    - United States case law
    - State decriminalization and legalization
      - Legal history of cannabis in the United States § Decriminalization (1970s–) (main)
    - Timelines
      - Category:2012 cannabis law reform
      - Category:2014 cannabis law reform
      - List of 2016 United States cannabis reform proposals
      - List of 2017 United States cannabis reform proposals
      - List of 2018 United States cannabis reform proposals
      - Timeline of cannabis laws in the United States
  - Uruguay: Cannabis in Uruguay

== Organizations ==
- Category:Cannabis industry trade associations
- List of cannabis rights organizations
- San Francisco Cannabis Buyers Club, first dispensary in U.S.

== Products ==
List of hemp products

- Hemp
  - Hemp beer
  - Hemp fiber
  - Hemp hurds
  - Hemp milk
  - Hemp oil
  - Hemp protein
- Miscellaneous products
  - Cannabis flower essential oil

== Regional issues ==
- Emerald Triangle

== Science ==
- Endocannabinoid system
  - Cannabinoid receptor
    - Cannabinoid receptor type 1 (CB_{1})
    - Cannabinoid receptor type 2 (CB_{2})
- Medical cannabis research
- Researchers
  - John W. Huffman
  - Raphael Mechoulam, discoverer of THC and Anandamide

== See also ==
- Glossary of cannabis
