= List of hemp products =

Products using hemp as a component material

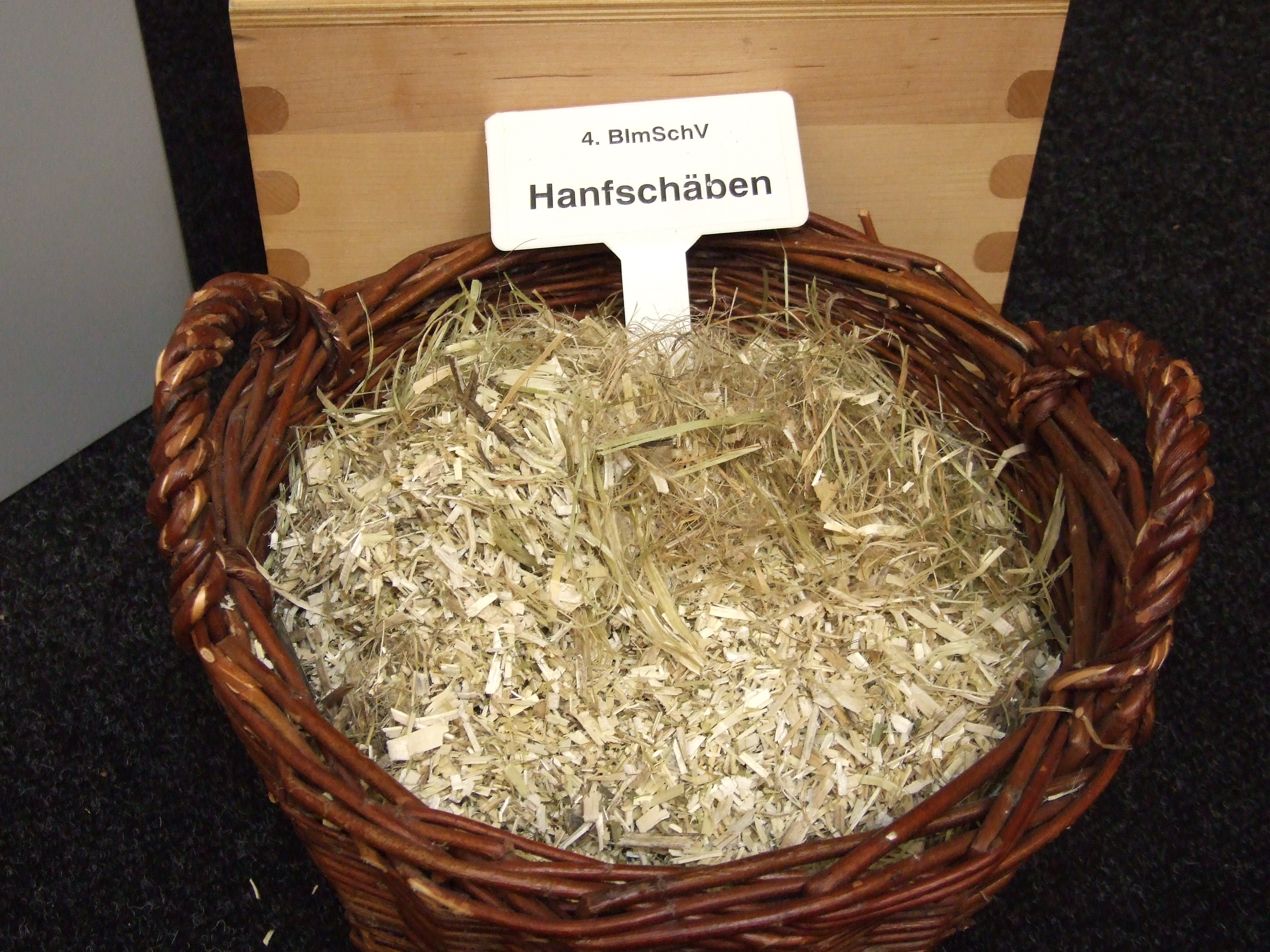
Hemp hurds can be used for animal bedding.

Hemp fiber, seed and oil can be used for a number of products.

Food products

- Hemp juice
- Hemp milk
- Hemp protein
- Maltos-Cannabis

Construction and materials

- Fiber reinforced plastic
- Hempcrete
- Oakum

Medicine

- Cannabis (drug)
- CBG oil
- Medical cannabis

Raw fiber

- Hemp fiber

Fuel

- Hemp oil can be used to make biodiesel
- Alcohol fuel

Other

- Hemp hurds
- Hemp jewelry
- Paper
- Sleeves for tablet computers
