= Spring Hope hemp mill =

Hemp processing facility in North Carolina, USA

- Location: 1436 Highway 581 North Spring Hope, North Carolina
- Coordinates: 35.9680°N 78.1120°W
- Industry: Cannabis industry
- Products: Hemp products
- Area: 70,000 sq ft (6,500 m^{2})
- Owners: Industrial Hemp Manufacturing, LLC (Hemp Inc.)

The Hemp Inc. mill in Spring Hope, North Carolina is the largest industrial hemp processing facility in the United States. It is on North Carolina Highway 581.

The mill, a 70,000-square-foot (6,500 m^{2}) former sweet potato processing plant, contains a decorticator to separate hemp hurds from external fibers, and supercritical carbon dioxide extraction for CBD recovery.

Fiber products will become textiles and composites used in the automobile industry.

== See also ==
- Hemp in North Carolina
