= Weaver's Day =

logo proposal for the Weaver's day

Weaver's day (pl. Dzień Tkaczki / Dzień Tkacza) – holiday that was inaugurated in Poland in 2008 by Urszula Wolska. The holiday is celebrated at first Saturday of October. This month was pickup, as the day of celebration, because polish name of October, Październik, came from the word paździerze (en. Shives).
