= Cang =

Cang or CANG may refer to:

- Cang County, in Hebei, China
- Cangue, small device that was used for public humiliation
- California National Guard
- Canada goose, bird species alpha code used by banders
- Cang Du is a Quincy of the Wandenreich and also member of the groups Sternritter from Bleach.
- Cannabis Act (Germany) (Cannabisgesetz, officially abbreviated CanG)
