= Cannabis Act =

Cannabis Act may refer to:

- Cannabis Act (Canada), 2018 legislation
- Cannabis Act (Germany), 2024 legislation
