= Canon (bar) =

Bar in Seattle, Washington, U.S.

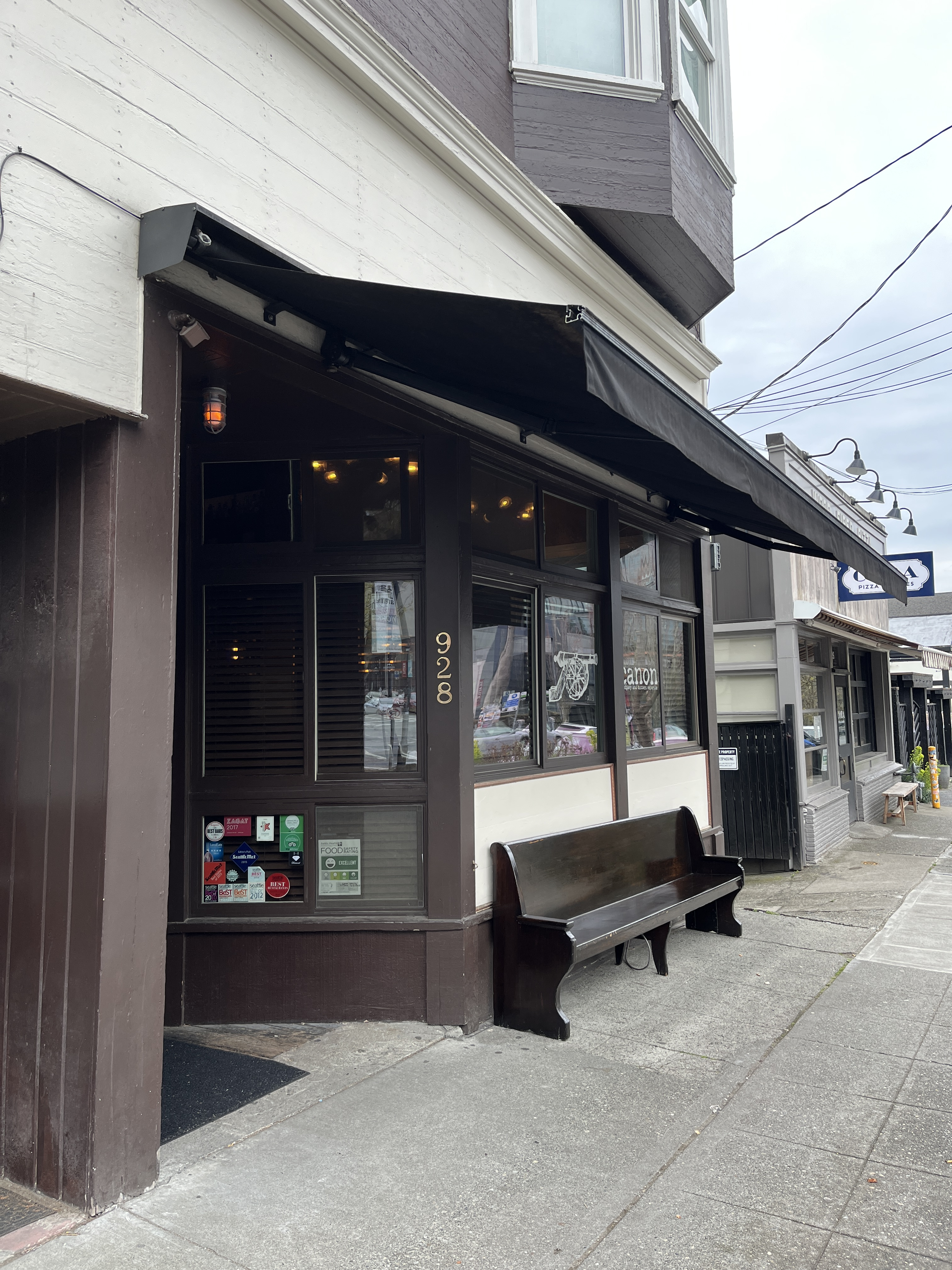
- The bar's exterior, April 2023
- Interactive map of Canon

Restaurant information
- Owner: Jamie Boudreau
- Location: 928 12th Avenue, Seattle, King, Washington, 98122, United States
- Coordinates: 47.6113°N 122.3166°W
- Website: canonseattle.com

Canon is a cocktail bar in Seattle, Washington, United States. Located on 12th Avenue near Seattle University, the bar has been recognized for having the "World's Best Spirits Selection".

== Description ==
Thrillist has described Canon as a "snug bespoke whiskey bar and bitters emporium" with the world's largest selection of American whiskey. Condé Nast Traveler has described Canon as "world-class cocktails in a glowy spirits library where pretty booze bottles twinkle and shine".

In 2017, Aimee Rizzo of The Infatuation wrote, "Canon is the Willy Wonka's Chocolate Factory of cocktails. The encyclopedic menu has pages upon pages of classic mixed drinks and original ones with intricate involvements like smokes, syrups, rinses, and/or Cap'n Crunch-infused ice cream floating on top. Plus, everything is served in whimsical vessels like light bulbs, Russian nesting dolls, glass hearts you wear around your neck, or IV bags that drip into your glass. Once you decide which nuanced masterpiece in mixology to order, watch the bartenders gather the ingredients from the bookshelves of liquors so massive they need their own Dewey Decimal System."

Drinks have included the Canon Cocktail (rye, Ramazzotti, triple sec foam, bitters) and the Campfire in Georgia (mezcal, peach-habanero shrub, orange juice, cinnamon French oak, bitters). The Mandalorian Milk has dark rum, cacao, spicy vanilla citrus, green chartreuse, hemp milk, and bitters. The DK Ain't Got Sh*t On Me is served in a Donkey Kong game cartridge and has Japanese whiskey, rosé aperitif, banana, and chapparel. The Mrs. Eale's Receipt is served in a cone with ginger smoke and has bourbon, dark rum, oloroso sherry, vanilla, and ceylon.

== History ==
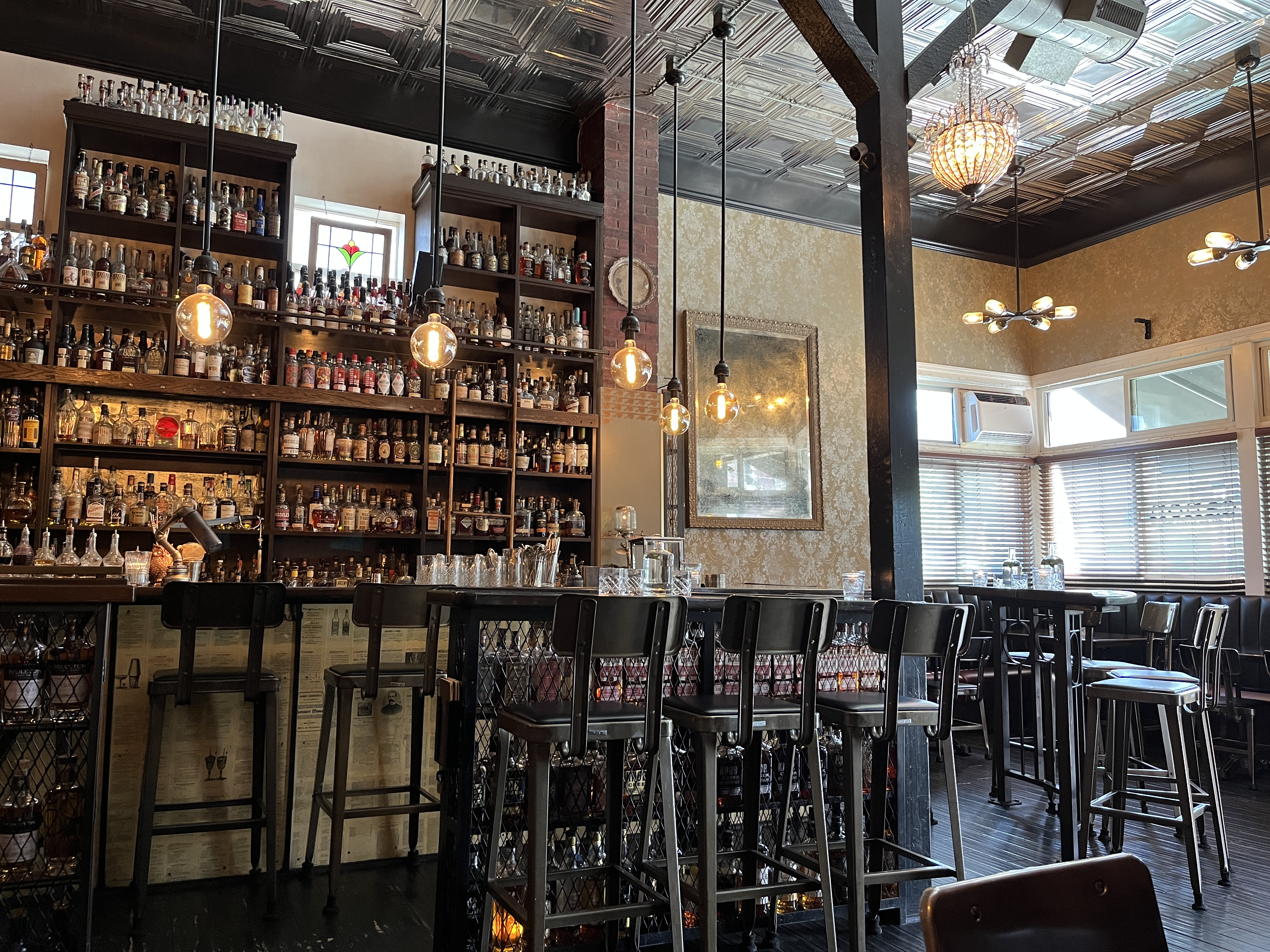
The bar's interior, 2023

Jamie Boudreau is the owner. The business closed temporarily, during the COVID-19 pandemic.

== Reception ==
Seattle Magazine named Canon the city's best new bar in 2012. Canon placed sixth in Drinks International's 2014 list of The World's 50 Best Bars. Chona Kasinger included the business in Thrillist's 2014 list of Seattle's ten best whiskey bars. The website's Naomi Tomky and Bradley Foster included Canon in a 2022 list of "The Absolute Best Bars in Seattle Right Now". The Infatuation's Aimee Rizzo included Canon in a 2023 list of Seattle's 19 best bars.
