= Drug and precursor laws by country or territory =

The legal status of drugs and drug precursors varies substantially from country to country and is still changing in many of them. United Nations classify drugs internationally, it affects all its member states.

== Territories ==
Territory	Drug and precursor laws
United Nations	INCB – Single Convention on Narcotic Drugs, 1961; INCB – Convention on Psychotropic Substances, 1971; INCB – United Nations Convention Against Illicit Traffic in Narcotic Drugs and Psychotropic Substances, 1988; INCB "Green list" – List of Psychotropic Substances under International Control; INCB "Yellow list" – List of Narcotic Drugs under International Control; Chemical Weapons Convention, 1997; UN Convention on Drug Precursor Chemicals; INCB "Red list" – List of Chemicals frequently used in the Illicit Manufacture of Narcotic Drugs and Psychotropic Substances under International Control

== Countries ==
Country	Drug and precursor laws
Germany	Anlage I; Anlage II; Anlage III
Sweden	Narkotikastrafflagen; Läkemedelsverkets föreskrifter om förteckningar över narkotika; Lagen om förbud mot vissa hälsofarliga varor; List of substances; Kontroll av narkotikaprekursorer (up to date list of laws)
New Zealand	Search engine
Philippines	Comprehensive Dangerous Drugs Act of 2002
United Kingdom	Medicines Act 1968; Misuse of Drugs Act 1971; Misuse of Drugs Regulations 2001; Drugs Act 2005; Psychoactive Substances Act 2016
United States	Controlled Substances Act; Federal Analogue Act
