= Maltos-Cannabis =

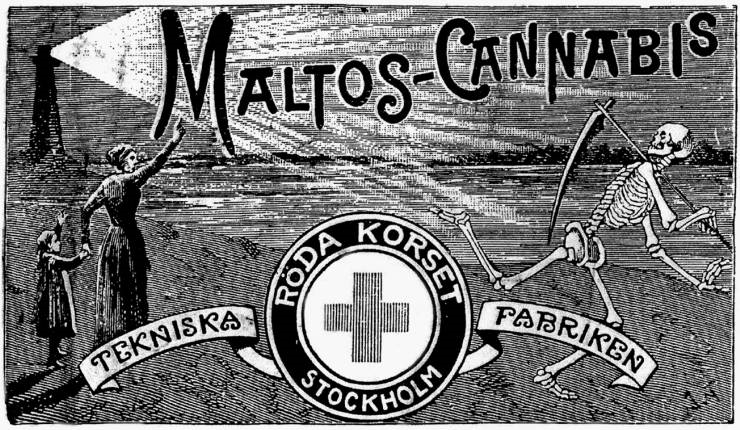
Advertisement

Maltos-Cannabis was a Swedish hemp seed-based malt beverage "food remedy" with sedative qualities produced beginning around the late 19th century into the early 20th century. The product contained malt and hemp seed fatty extract.

Produced between 1892 and 1912 in Stockholm by Tekniska Fabriken Röda Korset (Red cross technical factory), the product was widely available in Sweden, Denmark, and Norway, and advertised in a number of American publications.

An 1899 pharmaceutical reference book printed in Philadelphia defined the product as a "Swedish nutrient in form of a yellowish-white powder, possessing a taste at first saline, later sweetish, and then acrid and bitter."

== See also ==
- Cannabis tea
- Hemp juice
