= 2025 Soest torture and rape case =

Crime in Germany

Over the course of several months in 2025, a 33-year-old woman was tortured, abused and raped in a residential area of Soest, Germany. On the evening of 3 November 2025 she was discovered by neighbors and freed by police. The four male suspects aged 16, 17, 24 and 29 are set to go to trial in October 2026.

== Ordeal ==
Over the course of several months in 2025, the 33-year-old woman was tortured, humiliated, raped and intermittently locked up at the row house of the 29-year-old main suspect. The suspects are accused of making the homeless woman psychologically dependent by offering food and shelter and punishing her harshly for supposed misbehavior. Reports of abuse include:

- The woman was sometimes locked up in the basement and tied to a heating pipe.
- She was hit hard.
- She was raped.
- She was forced to eat excrement.
- She was splashed with a pressure washer.

On 3 November, a neighbor saw the woman hanging half-naked on the patio of the house and alerted police. She had been hanging there for several hours, was severely hypothermic and was unconscious. After her rescue she required several months of hospital care.

== Suspects ==
The police identified four male suspects aged 16, 17, 24 and 29, all of which have a German passport. One of the suspects went into hiding but eventually all four were caught. The two adult suspects are in pre-trial detention as of August 2026.

The 29-year-old is considered the main suspect. He was already known to the police. The crimes occurred at the house where he lived with his partner and their three children.

== Trial ==
The trial is set to commence on 12 October 2026 at the juvenile division of Arnsberg district court. The indictment covers grave bodily injury, joint bodily injury, rape, coercion, false imprisonment and cannabis trade. The 33-year-old victim will appear as joint-plaintiff.
