= Seiter =

The surname Seiter is of German origin, primarily found in the Swabian region of southern Germany and Switzerland. It is an occupational surname derived from the Middle High German word "suter," meaning "shoemaker" or "cobbler." This term traces back to the Latin "sutor," which also signifies "shoemaker." In some instances, the surname may have originated from the Middle High German "seite," meaning "side," indicating a person who lived on the side of a valley or slope. The surname has several variations, including Sauter, Seuter, and Sutter. These variations are found across different regions of Germany and among German-speaking communities worldwide. Notable individuals bearing the Seiter surname include Daniel Seiter (c. 1642–1705), a Viennese-born Baroque painter known for his works in Italy. The Seiter family name has been present in various historical records, with early mentions dating back to the 13th century in Germany. Regarding heraldry, some Seiter family crests feature a swan, symbolizing grace and purity. Over time, bearers of the name have migrated to other countries, contributing to its presence in regions such as the United States and Canada.

Notable people with the surname include:

- Daniel Seiter (c.1642/1647–1705), Italian painter
- Jimmi Seiter (born 1945), American musician, producer and manager
- John Seiter (born 1944), American musician
- Michael P. Seiter (born 1978), Swiss-German journalist and consultant
- William A. Seiter (1890–1964), American film director
