= Suchtmittelgesetz =

Controlled-substances law of Austria

The Suchtmittelgesetz (SMG; Narcotic Substances Law) is the controlled-substances law of Austria, being passed in its current form in 1998 after the accession of the country to the European Union. It is a modification of the earlier Suchtgiftverordnung of 1951, and like the Narcotic Drugs Act (Betäubungsmittelgesetz, "BtMG") of Germany, the BtMG of Switzerland, the Controlled Substances Act of Canada and the United States, the Misuse Of Drugs Act of the UK and other such laws, is a consolidation of earlier laws and an implementation of international treaty obligations, such as the Single Convention on Narcotic Drugs.

Suchtmittel and Betäubungsmittel are somewhat different concepts; the latter are drugs which numb, namely narcotics like morphine, whilst Suchtmittel and Suchtgiften are drugs which cause a morbid seek orientation for their use in the user, therefore poisoning or corrupting the individual sense of initiative and concern for other matters.

The SMG brought Austrian narcotics law into line with the prevailing standards in the European Union, which Austria joined in 1995. Some vestiges of the 1951 SVV and earlier laws remain in place, such as local and provincial regulations dealing with registry and permit programmes for those dependent on narcotics including chronic pain patients and long-term unsupervised users of narcotics and the over the counter availability of codeine, dihydrocodeine, nicocodeine and similar drugs including some in other chemical/pharmaco-neurological categories.
