= Hemp juice =

Non-psychoactive juice

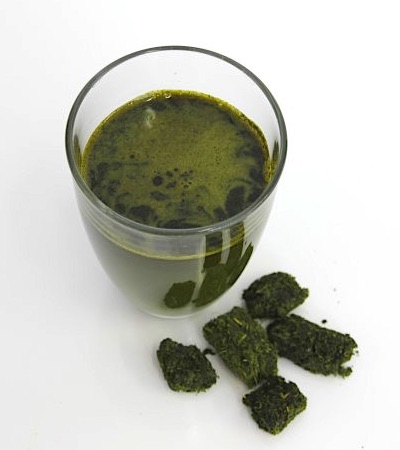
Hemp juice with residual material

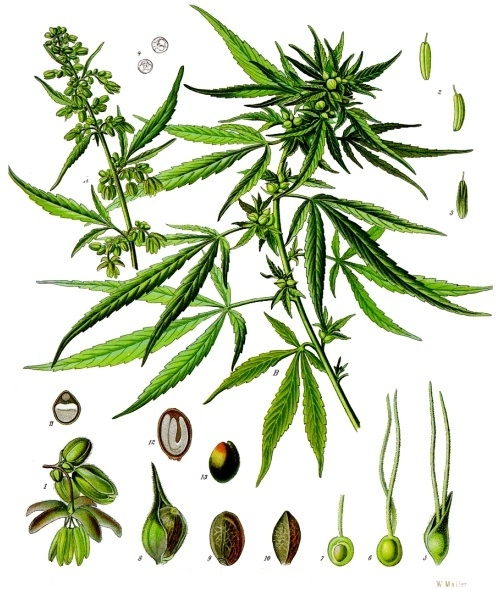
Cannabis sativa

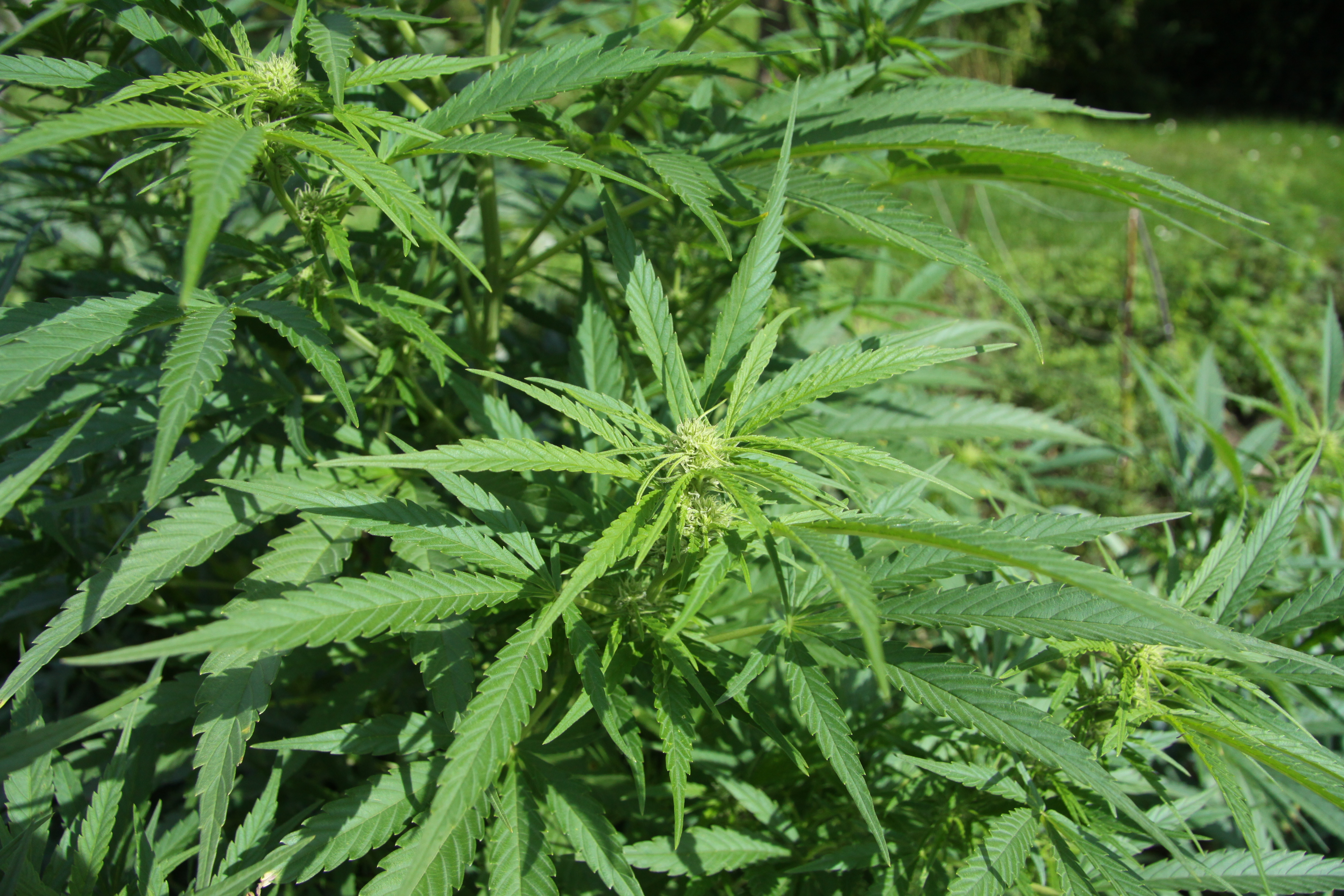
Industrial hemp plant (Cannabis sativa)

Hemp juice is a beverage derived from industrial hemp, made from the result of pressing the Cannabis sativa plant. The juice is obtained through a large-scale industrial cold-pressing procedure using the upper parts of the hemp plant as well as the leaves. This procedure distinguishes hemp juice from other hemp products such as hemp oil, hemp sprouts or hemp milk, which are obtained through the seeds of the hemp plant.

Proponents of hemp juice claim it as a base for a variety of drug-free products in the areas of nutrition, medicine, cosmetics, and beverages. Hemp juice has also been used as a flavor enhancer due to its umami flavor. Hemp juice has also appeared as a health food product due to the high amounts of proteins it contains.

Studies point out the medical potential of the cannabinoid CBD, which is found in industrial hemp and hemp juice. Drug-free industrial hemp and the hemp juice produced from it offer the advantages of legal cultivation and utilization in many countries, as opposed to the Cannabis Indica and Sativa plants, which have higher tetrahydrocannabinol (THC) content and are not legal in many countries.

People have found alternative uses for hemp juice. Hemp juice and its pressed remnants have been used to substitute some portion of flour in bread. It has also been used as a food supplement in the form of freeze-dried hemp juice powder for nutritional reasons, mostly thanks to the high percentage of protein hemp juice possesses.

Advocates for hemp juice and other hemp-based products cite hemp as a sustainable food source, due to its advantages in cultivation compared to other crops.

== Description ==
Hemp juice cold-pressed from industrial hemp prior to seed maturation and is an emulsion. This is because at the best time of harvest for industrial fiber the green hemp also contains the special omega oils, most cannabinoids as well as the other valuable ingredients in the suspended particles. All hemp varieties with a THC content of below 0.2% classify as industrial hemp in Europe (below 0.3% in the US and Canada) and are defined as drug-free foods and therefore legal under EU, US and Canadian law, allowing them to be marketed without stipulations put on higher THC based hemp products in those countries.

== Contents and characteristics ==
=== Content ===
Drug-free hemp juice contains all of the ingredients of the hemp plant in their natural form and matrix. The highest content of cannabinoids and proteins can be found in the hemp plant prior to seed maturation when the hemp plant is still green.

The main ingredients of hemp juice besides the presence omega-n-fatty acids are more than 100 cannabinoids, which are recognized by special receptors in the human body (endocannabinoid system and signal transduction). Hemp is the only botanical source of cannabinoids.

Hemp juice contains many easily digestible proteins, in particular all of the eight essential amino acids important for humans. Furthermore, the juice contains a variety of minerals, vitamins and many polyphenols.

=== Measuring methods for contents of cannabinoids ===
Measuring methods for cannabinoids are based on the extraction of fluids from the hemp plant. Research and studies conducted at the University of Wuppertal (Germany) have shown that extracts contain much less of the initial contents of the hemp plant present in the juice. Besides, with extracts there is a risk of residues of solvents.

There are no specific measuring methods for the quantities of cannabinoids in hemp juice accepted by all states. The EU is working on the development of a commonly accepted procedure. An alternative procedure used for the extraction of fluids first filters and centrifuges the hemp juice. The findings however showed no traces of cannabinoids because the characteristic contents of the hemp plant solely can be found in the unfiltered hemp juice.

=== Flavor and Color ===
The juice of the uppermost parts of the plant has an intensive green color; its pure flavor is bitter – hempy. The juice of the fibers and shives of the plant is lighter in color and tastes sweet. Hemp juice creates a distinct umami flavor, based on the multitude of proteins, polyphenols and cannabinoids in the hemp plant. The bitter taste of the hemp juice is transformed into a fresh and sweet flavor after mixing it with vegetable or fruit juices. Moreover, the original taste of fruits and vegetables may be highlighted with the use of hemp juice.

== Production ==
=== Harvest and pressing ===
Industrial hemp – harvesting separate parts for different further processing: The upper part of the plant is being collected for the cold-pressing procedure of hemp juice. The lower part of the plant remains on the field to rot for fabric production.

Hemp juice is produced in a patented industrial procedure directly following harvest whereby the leafy upper part of the plant, including the flower heads, are being cold-pressed after harvest. These parts of the hemp plant have been entirely neglected so far in industrial hemp fabric production. Hence, through the procedure of pressing juice, a previously neglected highly valuable part of the plant is now being used for human consumption. All active ingredients remain fully intact without drying the hemp. The juice does not compete with the production of fibers and shives instead both add up to double revenue of the farmer.

The average yield of hemp juice is approximately 3 tons per hectare. This newly developed production procedure allows for a significantly higher financial efficiency as well as sustainability in the cultivation of drug-free industrial hemp. Furthermore, the cold-pressing procedure preserves all of the plant-based active ingredients.

There are two common harvesting procedures: "Cutting" the upper parts of the hemp plant or "stripping" the leaves off the uppermost part of the hemp plant. Both these procedures result in varying quantities of cannabinoids in the hemp juice. Consequently, the harvesting procedure in itself already influences the quality of the resulting hemp juice.

If one only uses the uppermost, leafy part of the hemp plant for hemp juice production, the remaining part of the hemp plant can still be used for the industrial production of its fibers or any other industrial uses. Subsequently, the juice production creates a significant additional financial gain without compromising the fiber production in any way. In climate zones in which hemp seeds do not ripen easily such as Northern Europe, the juice production represents and additional utilization of the hemp plant.

Additionally to hemp juice, press remnants of approximately 3 tons per ha are being gained. A quarter to a third of the ingredients found in hemp juice are present in the press remnants. These constitute a valuable food part for humans as well for instance used to bake bread. They also can be dried or fermented and used as cattle feed. On top of this, cold-pressing the fibers and shives offers an additional added value of the plant.

It is also possible with a suitable pressing procedure during harvest to press the juice of the entire hemp plant. The use of the fiber in industry is not necessarily compromised if the right pressing process is chosen. The resulting juice of the hemp stem represents an additional value added. It can be used for bio-gas production of energy or in fermenting lactic acid for the chemical industry. Cold-pressing the fibers and shives does not compromise their value for further industrial processing.

=== Juice content ===
The juice content of the plant varies depending on the age of the plant, since younger plants contain more juice than older ones. The plant provides the least juice after seed maturation because the leaves have already begun decay at that point. Depending on the kind of press used, the amount of resulting juice varies significantly. On average, 50% of the weight of the plant is obtained as juice. The water to dry matter ratio of the juice shows high dry matter content in the upper part of the plant, and is lowest in the leaves when the seeds are ripe. The dry matter content is medium in the fibers and lowest in the shives. The relatively high content of dry matter implies a high percentage of substance components such as carbohydrates, amino acids, protein, fat, cannabinoids, polyphenols, as well as other substrates.

=== Partial harvest ===
This procedure allows for the harvest of leaves for hemp juice as well as hemp seeds from the same field in areas where the climate is suitable. This procedure starts a few weeks after sowing, with the harvest of the leafy tops only. As a consequence, the plant grows new tops which will be multiply leafy tops in most cases and they can be harvested later on. If the plant grows on until seeds are ripe, hemp seeds can be harvested. Thus, harvest for juice and harvest for seeds are both possible. Partial harvest can help to increase the seed crop.

=== Storability and stability ===
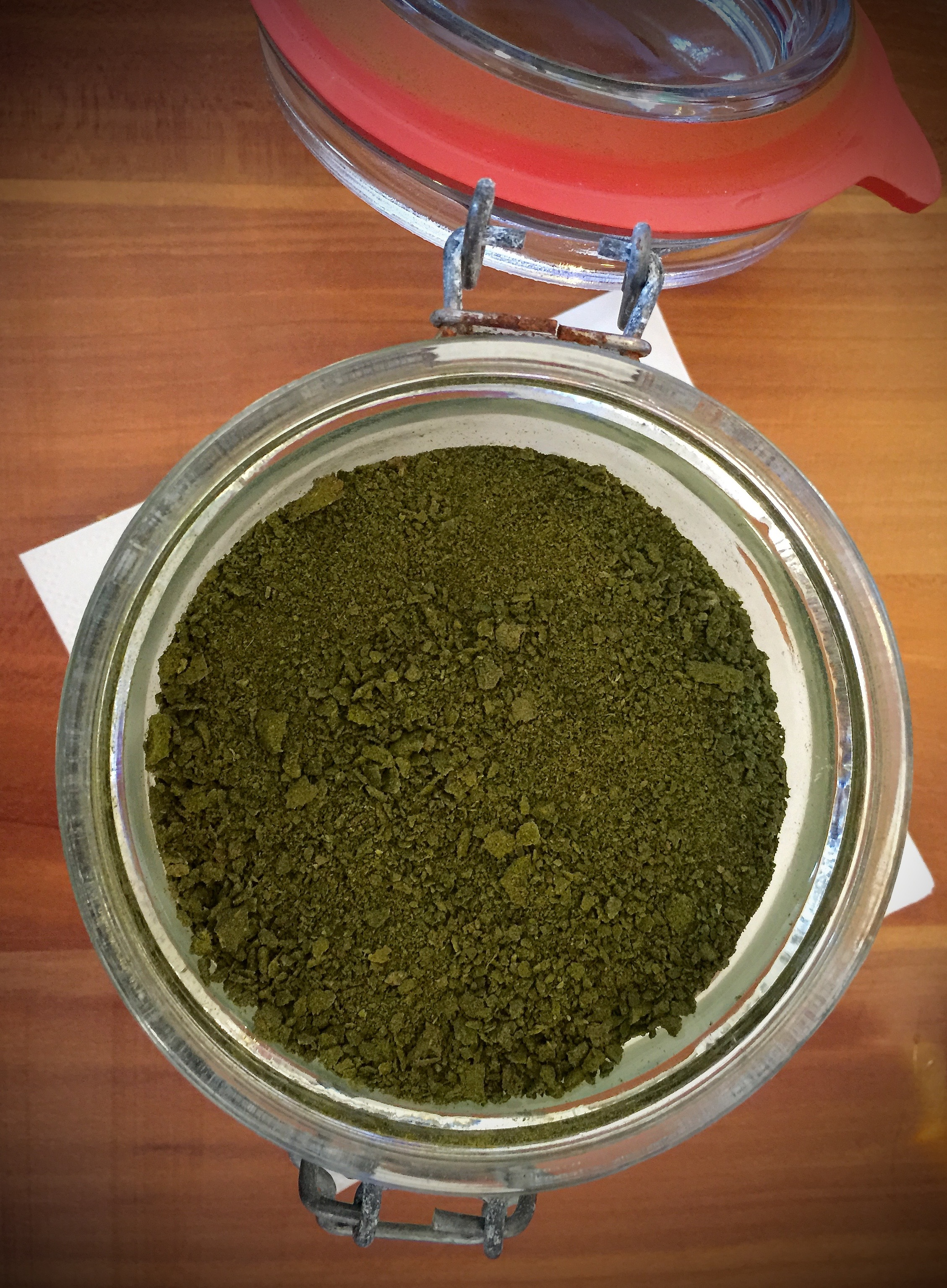
Freeze-dried hemp juice

A common way to preserve the longevity of hemp juice is to freeze the freshly cold-pressed juice instantly for preservation. The quality of the juice depends on immediate freezing, hence, the frozen juice can be freeze-dried into a storable powder. Freezing and freeze-drying stabilize the natural form of the cannabinoids as cannabinoid-acids. Another procedure is pasteurization, where the ultra-heat-treatment will "activate" the cannabinoids by separating the acid part from the natural cannabinoids. Increasing shelf life of hemp juice can also be achieved by fermentation, using various procedures, usually by adding yeast or yeast extract and sugar. With salt's role in food preservation hemp juice is no different. With regard to hemp juice this can be done by mixing salt with fresh hemp juice, which leads to a "hemp salt" type product.

== Use ==
The juice is drinkable, yet not palatable in its pure form due to its bitter taste. The bitterness diminishes as the hemp juice is mixed with fruit or vegetable juices. The hemp juice simultaneously heightens the fruity, savory and sweet taste of juices and foods in general. Therefore hemp juice is often used in drinks, certain food dishes, seasoning, food supplements, medical products as well as cosmetics. The press remnants can also be used as food supplements.

=== Differentiation ===
Hemp juice can be clearly distinguished from other liquid products of the hemp plant. Hemp milk and hemp oil, just like soy milk, are produced from the seeds of the plant. Beverages such as hemp beer use the dried flowers or dried leaves of the plant. When dried parts of hemp are used in water and extract results. Water extraction only contains a proportion of about 10% of hemp ingredients otherwise found in cold-pressed juice, therefore, cold-pressed hemp juice contains a much higher percentage of notable ingredients. More importantly, water extraction does not contain any of the important cannabinoids as they cling to the fatty acids of the plant, which are not dissolved in water extraction. That being said, cold-pressed hemp juice does contain the valuable cannabinoids. These valuable ingredients are also preserved when hemp is juiced in a conventional home blender. This process of juicing is not suitable for industrial hemp because the plant fibers used for industrial applications are too hard to digest for humans.

=== Beverages ===
Hemp juice can be used for mixed non-alcoholic drinks or as a base for alcoholic drinks. The juice is often used for relaxing soft drinks due to its calming effects. For instance:

- As iced-tea mix
- As fermented mix without alcohol (vegetable or fruit juice)
- As a supplement for vegetable or fruit juices to intensify the sweet flavor, to increase the nutritional value, as well as to create a umami taste
- Light or dark hemp drink without alcohol similar to beer
- As a distilled hard liquor, such as hemp spirit
- As herb liqueur or bitter using alcohol and sugar in the production process
- As a mixer for alcoholic drinks such as cocktails
- As a brewing ingredient for hemp beer
- As a base for gluten-free beer

Gluten-free hemp beer does not require malt or cereal mash and it is low in calories. Hemp as a close relative of hops provides the fine and bitter beer taste even without using any hops.

=== Seasoning ===
While the taste of hemp juice itself is not notable, people have found the intensifying properties makes hemp juice useful as seasoning. Hemp juice can reduce salt and sugar use in foods considerably without sacrificing taste.

- Hemp Microgreens Powder works well as a seasoning on salads, in smoothies or just mixed in pure water.
- Hemp salt: Hemp juice is mixed and dried with good quality table salt. It can be used for cooked as well as uncooked dishes. Henceforth, cannabinoids are consumed in their natural cannabinoid-acid form as well as in their activated form. Hemp salt helps reduce salt intake due to its natural effect of intensifying flavors.
- Hemp sugar or hemp syrup: Hemp juice can lower sugar intake when consumed in combination with fruit juices, sweet dishes, or sugar because it intensifies sweet flavors significantly.
- Hemp juice and its umami flavor enhance the savory taste of any dish and is suitable for use in mixing, cooking, baking, ready meals, beverages, seasoning, pastries, jams, and soups (Siemieniotka).

=== Food supplement ===
The valuable cannabinoids, proteins, vitamins, minerals, polyphenols, and poly-unsaturated fatty acids are useful to prevent deficiencies and aid muscle growth. Athletes for instance use protein powder made from hemp. Hemp juice offers a natural alternative to the industrially produced hemp protein. Even the dietary fibers in the press remnants can be used for food supplements if fermented. Finely ground hemp press remnants can substitute some portion of flour in bread recipes with yeast.

=== Medicine (pharmaceutical) ===
Cannabis has been used in traditional medicine over centuries. Today, cannabis is subjected to medical research mostly concentrating on the cannabinoids THC and CBD. The cannabis varieties used for the production of the hemp juice such as cannabis sativa are high in CBD content. Hemp juice can also be added into crèmes and gels, and used as an eczema treatment.

=== Additive for cosmetics ===
The juice can be used in skin creams due to its high polyphenol, vitamin and protein content. Hemp salt unfolds its soothing effect on neurodermatitis as a bath additive. Hemp juice is now appearing as an inactive ingredient in many cosmetic products.

=== Leather care product ===
Evaporation liquid can be collected when leaving industrial hemp for a couple of hours after harvest. This liquid is useful in cleaning and softening leather surfaces, such as car seats, furniture and clothing.
