= Georg Wurth =

German lobbyist and activist

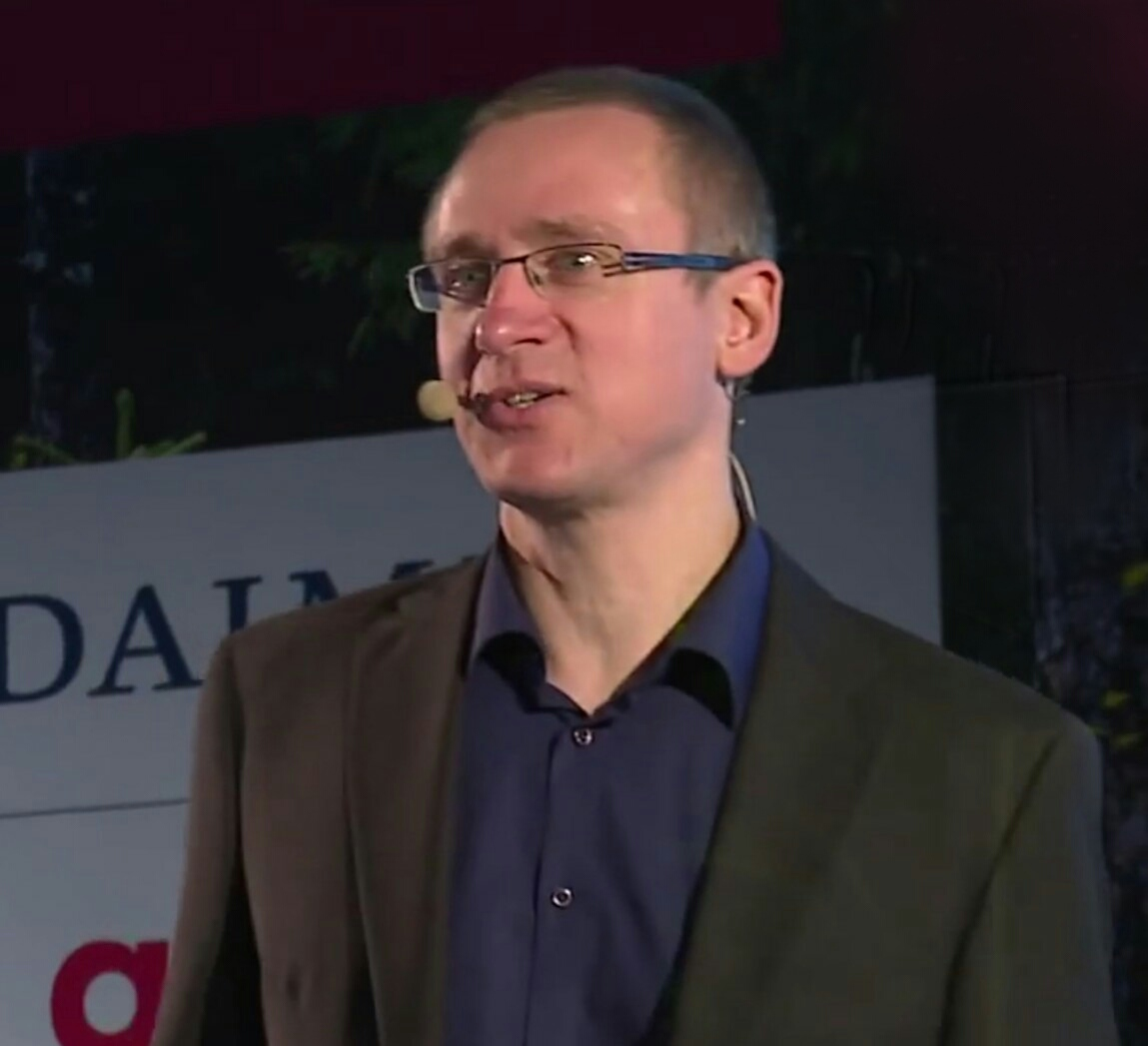
Georg Wurth in 2014

Georg Wurth (born 1972 in Remscheid) is a German lobbyist and activist. He is CEO and owner of the German Hemp Association (DHV), the largest organisation of the hemp rights movement in Germany.

== See also ==
- 2022 German cannabis legalization framework
- Cannabis in Germany
