= Hemp in Washington =

Hemp in the U.S. state of Washington has emerged as an experimental crop in the 21st century.

== Historical production ==
The U.S. Government reported no hemp production in Washington in 1890, nor did the state government in 1914 or 1922.

=== Related crops in Washington ===
Cannabis and Humulus lupulus are both members of the family Cannabaceae, and a number of similarities in the botany and human use of the two species have been noted. (Note: See subsection titled "The incredibly parallel histories of cannabis and its closest relative, humulus (hop)" in Small (2016)) Humulus lupulus produces hops, a crop grown in quantity west of the Cascades historically (especially the Snoqualmie and Puyallup River valleys) and is a major 21st century crop in the Yakima Valley. (Note: Washington leads national hop production, for instance 75% of national yield in 2015.)

== Prohibition and legalization ==
All cannabis was made illegal by the Washington State Legislature in 1923. Although Washington voters legalized marijuana in 2012 with I-502, the initiative did not authorize hemp cultivation or sales.

In accordance with the Federal 2014 Farm Bill, the state legislature created an Industrial Hemp Research Pilot (IHRP) in 2016 following passage of ESSB 6206 (codified as Revised Code of Washington Chapter 15.120), with regulation by the Washington State Department of Agriculture. Industrial hemp is defined in Washington as cannabis with a THC concentration of 0.3 percent or less by dry weight. (Note: The 0.3% THC definition is compatible with the Hemp Farming Act of 2018.) Under the 2018 farm bill, the state's Department of Agriculture is recognized by the United States federal government as the regulator for industrial-scale non-experimental hemp production.

State law defines hemp-derived products containing less than 0.3% THC as "Cannabis Health and Beauty Aids".

Following the 2018 United States farm bill, the state legislature passed SB 5276, and it was signed by the governor on April 26, 2019, establishing a full-scale agriculture program and allowing acquisition of crop seed without federal approval. Revised Code of Washington chapter 15.140 was added as a result.

=== First crops ===
The state's first post-Prohibition experimental hemp crop was planted at Moses Lake in 2017. (Note: As noted by the lack of reports of pre-1923 hemp production, it may have been the state's first hemp crop ever.) A total of 180 acres (73 ha) was planted statewide 2017. The first crop on tribal land in the United States may have been planted by the Confederated Tribes of the Colville Reservation in 2017.

== See also ==
- Cannabis in Washington (state)
