= Cannabis irradiation =

Process to remove contaminants from cannabis

Cannabis irradiation is a process used in the cannabis industry to remove or inactivate microbial contaminants (mold, fungus, etc.) from cannabis meant for human consumption, using various forms of radiation. The radiation applied may include gamma radiation, electron beam irradiation, and X-rays. Cold plasma has also been studied experimentally in Israel. As of 2021, the most common radiation used to decontaminate was gamma rays. In the regulated Canadian market, "irradiation is considered to be an effective way of meeting [microbial contaminants] standards", and it has been "standard practice" since at least 2016 in Canada and the Netherlands.

== See also ==
- Cannabis product testing
- Food irradiation
