= Narcotic Drugs Act =

German controlled substances law

The Narcotic Drugs Act (German: Betäubungsmittelgesetz, pronounced [bəˈtɔɪ̯bʊŋsmɪtl̩ɡəˌzɛt͡s] or BtMG) is the controlled substances law of Germany. In common with the Misuse of Drugs Act of 1971 of the United Kingdom and Controlled Substances Acts of the US and Canada, it is a consolidation of prior regulation and an implementation of treaty obligations under the Single Convention on Narcotic Drugs, Convention on Psychotropic Substances and other treaties.

The BtMG updated the German Opium Law 1929 and mirrors the Swiss BtMG and Austrian Suchtmittelgesetz.

The German Narcotics Act was re-announced on 1 March 1994. The last change to the law was the legalization of Cannabis in Germany on 1 April 2024. Since then, the handling of this drug has been subject to the German cannabis control bill.

== See also ==
- Drug policy of Germany
- Drugs controlled by the German Narcotic Drugs Act

== Links ==
- Non-official translation (as of 2009)
