= Hempcrete =

Biocomposite material used for construction and insulation

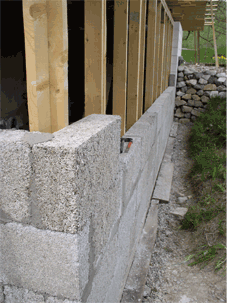
Construction block made from hempcrete

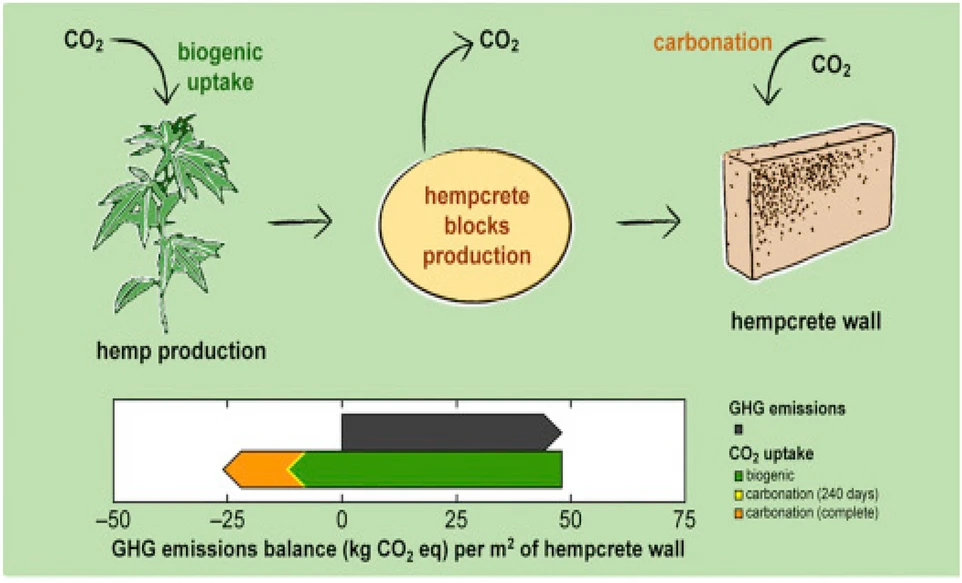
Illustration of hemp concrete carbon emission and sequestration, with a net emissions balance indicating carbon negativity

Hempcrete or hemplime is biocomposite material, a mixture of hemp hurds (shives) and lime, sand, or pozzolans, which is used as a material for construction and insulation. It is marketed under names like Hempcrete, Canobiote, Canosmose, Isochanvre, and IsoHemp. Hempcrete is easier to work with than traditional lime mixes and acts as an insulator and moisture regulator. It lacks the brittleness of concrete and consequently does not need expansion joints.

Typically, hempcrete has good thermal and acoustic insulation capabilities, but low mechanical performance, specifically compressive strength. When used in prefabricated blocks, hempcrete acts as a carbon sink throughout its lifetime. The result is a lightweight, fireproof, insulating material, finishing plaster, or a non-load bearing wall, ideal for most climates, since it combines insulation and thermal mass while providing a positive impact on the environment.

== History ==
There are some mentions of use of concrete building materials including hemp, like in India, 1727: "Puckah […] is a Composition of Brick-dust, Lime, Molasses, and cut Hemp, and when it comes to be dry, it is as hard and tougher than firm Stone or Brick."

== Mixture of materials ==
Hempcrete is made of the inner woody core of the hemp plant (hemp shives), a lime-based binder, and water. The binder consists of either hydrated lime or natural hydraulic lime. Hydrated lime is made from pure limestone and sets through the absorption of CO_{2} during the carbonation process. When dealing with time constraints, hydraulic binders are used in combination with regular hydrated lime, because the set time for hempcrete will be less than that of regular limes (e.g., about two weeks to a month, to gain adequate strength).

A small amount of cement, pozzolanic binder or both are added to speed up the setting time. The overall process creates a mixture that will develop into a solid, light, and durable product.

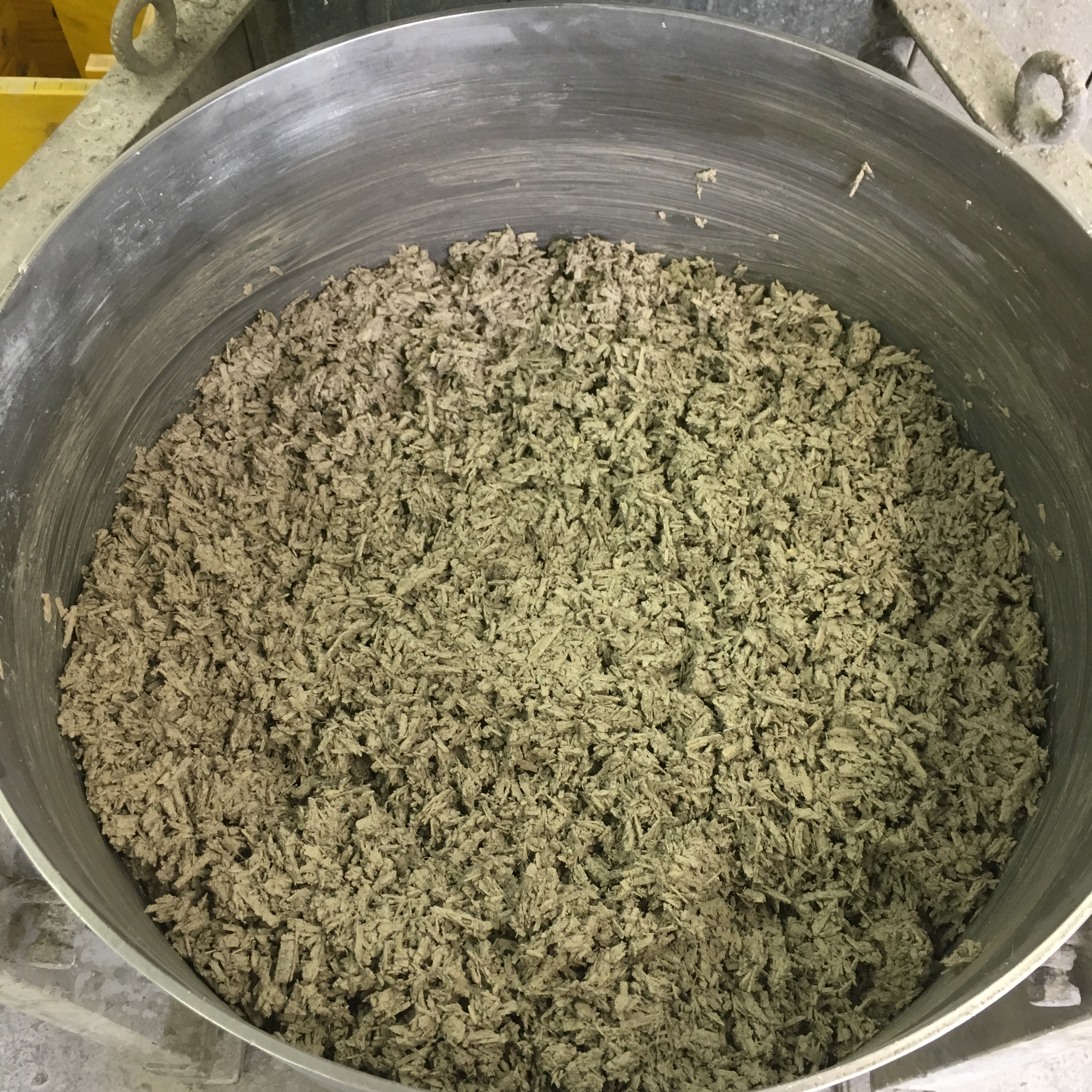
Freshly mixed hempcrete. Composed of hemp hurds, hydrated lime and water

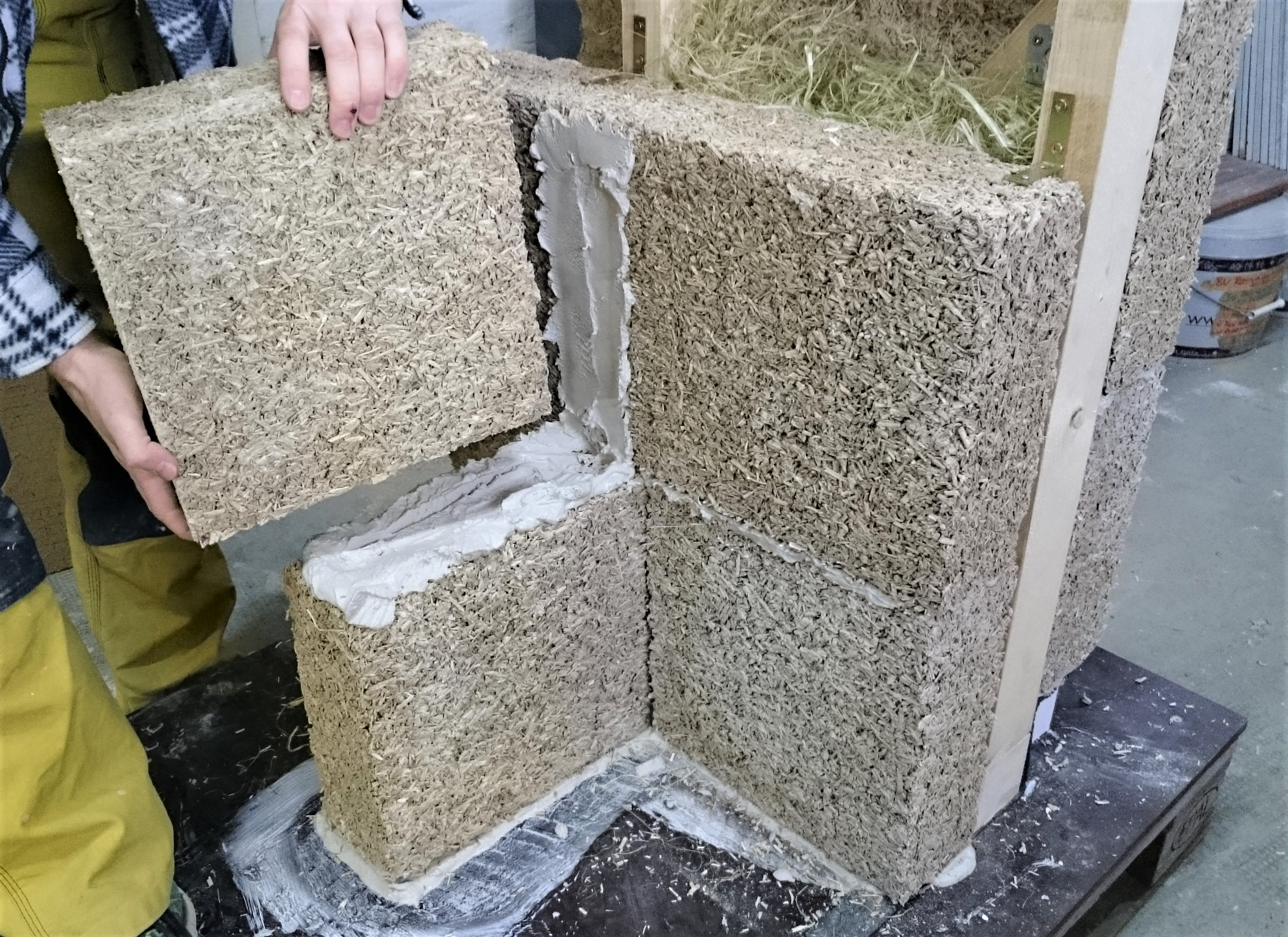
Hempcrete wall

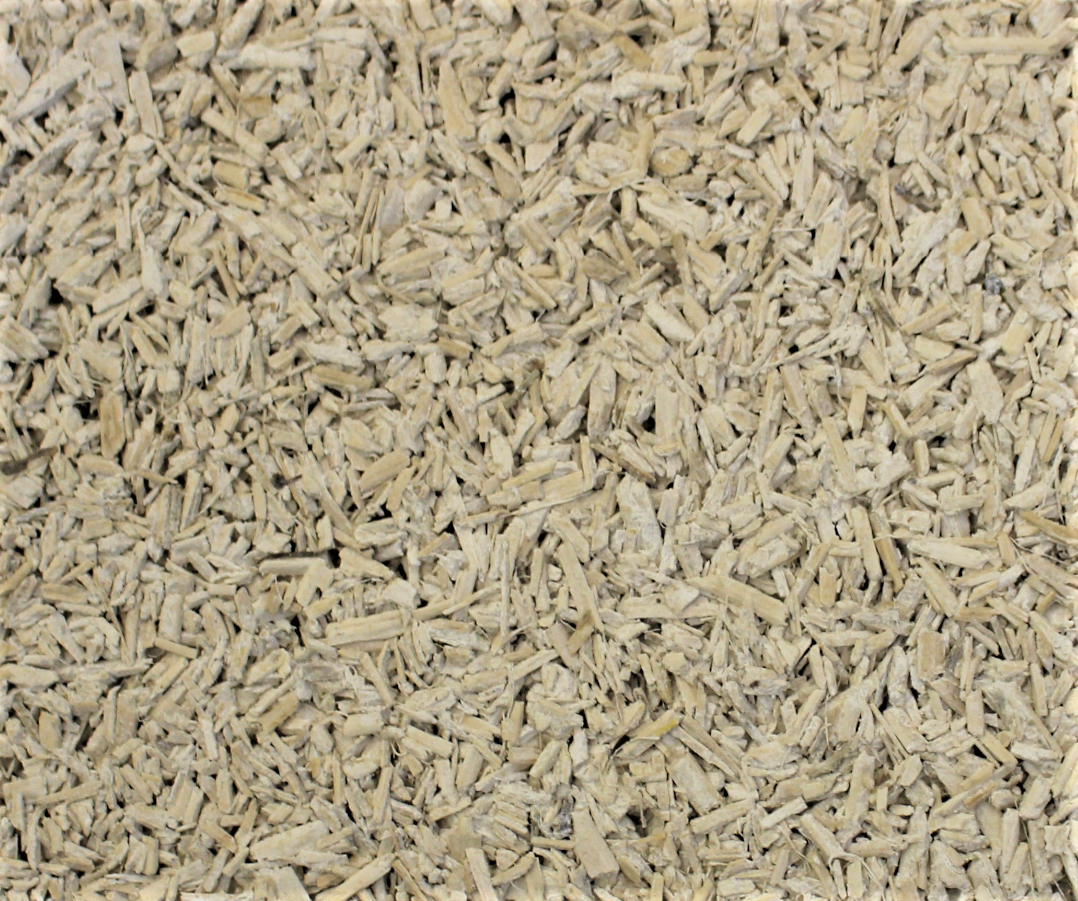
Structure of hempcrete

== Applications ==
Hempcrete has been used in France since the early 1990s, and more recently in Canada, to construct non-weight bearing insulating infill walls, as hempcrete does not have the requisite strength for constructing foundation and is instead supported by the frame. Hempcrete was also used to renovate old buildings made of stone or lime. France continues to be an avid user of hempcrete, and it grows in popularity there annually. Canada has followed France's direction in the organic building technologies sector, and hempcrete has become a growing innovation in Ontario and Quebec.

There are two primary construction techniques used right now for implementing hempcrete. The first technique consists of using forms to cast or spray hempcrete directly in place on the construction site. The second technique consists of stacking prefabricated blocks that are delivered to the project site similar to masonry construction. Once hempcrete technology is implemented between timber framing, drywall or plaster is added for aesthetics and increased durability. Hempcrete can be used for many purposes in buildings, including roof, wall, slab, and render insulation, each of which has its formulation and dosages of the various constituents respectively.

== Properties ==
=== Mechanical properties ===
Typically, hempcrete has a low mechanical performance. Hempcrete is a fairly new material and is still being studied. Several items affect the mechanical properties of hempcrete such as aggregate size, type of binder, proportions within the mixture, manufacturing method, molding method, and compaction energy. All studies show variability within hempcrete properties and determine that it is sensitive to many factors.

A study was conducted that focuses on the variability and statistical significance of hempcrete properties by analyzing two sizes of hempcrete columns with hemp from two different distributors under a normal distribution. The coefficient of variance (COV) indicates the dispersion of experimental results and is important in understanding the variability among hempcrete properties. Young's modulus continually has a high COV across multiple experiments. The Young's modulus of hempcrete is 22.5 MPA. Young's modulus and compressive strength are two mechanical properties that are correlated.

The compressive strength is typically around 0.3 MPA. Due to the lower compressive strength, hempcrete cannot be used for load-bearing elements in construction. Density is affected by drying kinetics, with a larger specific area the drying time decreases. The size of the specimen and the hemp shives should be accounted for when determining the density. In the model, the density of hempcrete is 415 kg/m^{3} with an average coefficient of variance (COV) of 6.4%.

Hempcrete's low density material and resistance to cracking under movement make it suitable for use in earthquake-prone areas. Hempcrete walls must be used together with a frame of another material that supports the vertical load in building construction, as hempcrete's density is 15% that of traditional concrete. Studies in the UK indicate that the performance gain between 230 mm (9 in) and 300 mm (12 in) walls is insignificant. Hempcrete walls are fireproof, transmit humidity, resist mould, and have excellent acoustic performance. Limecrete, Ltd. (UK) reports a fire resistance rating of 1 hour per British/EU standards.

=== Thermal properties ===
Hempcrete's R-value (its resistance to heat transfer) can range from 0.67/cm (1.7/in) to 1.2/cm (3.0/in) , making it an efficient insulating material (the higher the R-value, the better the insulation). The porosity of hempcrete falls within the range of 71.1% to 84.3% by volume. The average specific heat capacity of the hempcrete ranges from 1000 to 1700 J/(kg⋅K). The dry thermal conductivity of hempcrete ranges from 0.05 to 0.138 W/(m⋅K). The low thermal diffusivity (1.48×10^{−7} m^{2}/s) and effusivity [286 J/(m^{2}⋅K⋅s^{−1/2})] of hempcrete reduce the ability of hempcrete to activate the thermal mass.

Hemp concrete has a low thermal conductivity, ranging from 0.06 to 0.6 W m^{−1} K^{−1}, a total porosity of 68–80% and a density of 200 kg /m^{3} to 960 kg/m^{3}. Hemp concrete is also an aerated material with high water vapour permeability and its total porosity very close to open porosity allowing it to absorb significant amounts of water. The water vapour diffusion resistance of hemp concrete ranges from 5 to 25. Furthermore, between 2 and 4.3 g/ (m^{2}%RH), it is considered an excellent moisture regulator. It can absorb relative humidity when there is a surplus in the living environment and release it when there is a deficit. These properties depend on the composition of the material, the type of binder, temperature and humidity. Due to its latent heating effects, which are the results of its high thermal ability and comprehensive moisture control, hemp concrete exhibits phase change material properties.

Due to the large variety of hemp, the porosity differs from one type to another, therefore its thermal insulating abilities vary too. The lower the density, the lower the heat transfer coefficient, a characteristic of insulating materials. On three cubic samples of hempcrete after 28 days of drying the heat transfer coefficient was measured using ISOMET 2114, a portable system for measuring the heat transfer of properties. Hempcrete has a coefficient of heat transfer of 0.0652 W/(m⋅K) and a specific weight of 296 kg/m^{3}. Attention should be paid to mixing the hempcrete, as it influences the properties of the material. Further testing needs to be conducted in correlation to specimen size to determine the influence that size has on the properties of hempcrete.

=== Other ===
In the United States, a permit is needed for the use of hemp in building.

Hempcrete has a high silica content, which makes it more resistant to biological degradation than other plant products.

== Benefits and constraints ==
Hempcrete materials are a product of a type of binder and hemp shives size and quality, and the proportions in the mixture can greatly affect its properties and performance. The most notable limiting factor with hempcrete is the low mechanical performance. Due to low mechanical performance, the material should not be used for load-bearing structures.

Although it is not known for its strength, hempcrete provides a high vapor permeability that allows for better control of temperature in an indoor environment. It can also be used as a filling material in frame structures and be used to make prefabricated panels. Altering the density of hempcrete mixtures also affects its use. Higher-density hempcrete mixtures are used for floor and roof insulation, while lower-density mixtures are used for indoor insulation and outdoor plasters.

Hempcrete block walls can be laid without any covering or can be covered with finishing plasters. This latter uses the same hempcrete mixture but in different proportions. Since hempcrete contains a plant-based compound, walls need to be built with a joint in between the wall and ground to prevent capillary rising of water and runoff, blocks need to be installed above ground level and exterior walls should be protected with sand and plasters to avoid rotting shives.

== Life cycle analysis ==
Just like any crop, hemp absorbs CO_{2} from the atmosphere while growing, so hempcrete is considered a carbon-storing material. A hempcrete block continually stores CO_{2} during its entire life, from fabrication to end-of-life, creating positive environmental benefits. Through a life cycle assessment (LCA) of hempcrete blocks using research and X-ray Powder Diffraction (XRPD), it was found that the blocks store a large quantity of carbon from photosynthesis during plant growth and by carbonation during the use phase of the blocks.

The LCA of hempcrete blocks considers seven unit processes: hemp shives and production, binder production, transport of raw materials to the manufacturing company, hempcrete blocks production processes, transport of hempcrete blocks to the construction site, wall construction, and the use phase. The impact assessment of each process was analyzed using the following impact categories: abiotic depletion (ADP), fossil fuel depletion (ADP Fossil), global warming over a time interval of 100 years (GWP), ozone depletion (ODP), acidification (AP), eutrophication (EP), and photochemical ozone creation (POCP).

The binder production provides the largest environmental impact while the transport phases are the second. During binder production in the lime calcination and clinker creation portion, the emissions are the most notable. A large amount of diesel consumption in the transport phases and during the manufacturing of hemp shives created a large portion of the cumulative energy demand and along with the calcination of lime which takes place in kilns, is a main source of fossil fuel emissions. Abiotic depletion is mostly attributed to the electricity used during binder production and although minimal, also during the block production processes. It is important to focus on the water content in a hempcrete mixture, because too much water can cause slow drying and create a negative impact, preventing lime carbonation.

The main cause of the environmental footprint for hempcrete comes from the production of the binder. Reports have estimated that 18.5% - 38.4% of initial emissions from binder production can be recovered through the carbonation process. The specific amount of carbonates in the blocks actually increases with the age of the block. During the growth of hemp the plant absorbs CO_{2}, the binder begins to absorb CO_{2} after the mixing process, and the wall absorbs CO_{2} counteracting the greenhouse emissions, by acting as a carbon sink. A hempcrete block will continue to store carbon throughout its life and can be crushed and used again as a filler for insulation. The amount of CO_{2} capture within the net life cycle CO_{2} emissions of hempcrete is estimated to be between -1.6 to -79 kg CO_{2}e/m^{2}. There is a correlation that increasing the mass of the binder which increases the mixture density will increase the total estimated carbon uptake via carbonation.

The impacts arising from indirect land use changes of hemp cultivation, maintenance work, and end-of-life need to be studied to create a full cradle-to-grave environmental impact profile of hempcrete blocks. To counteract the negative environmental impacts that hempcrete blocks have on the environment the transport distances should be shortened as much as possible. Since hempcrete is not typically load-bearing, ratios should be explored to possibly completely remove the cement from the mixture.

== Summary ==
Hempcrete is a fairly new natural building material whose usage has increased throughout European countries in recent years and is gaining traction within the United States. The Hemp Building Foundation submitted paperwork to the International Residential Codes (IRC) in February 2022 to certify the material as a national building material, allowing the construction industry to gain more familiarity with the material.

Hempcrete is a construction building material that uses hemp shives, aggregate, water, and a type of binder to act as non-bearing walls, insulators, finishing plasters, and blocks. The material has low mechanical properties and low thermal conductivity, making it ideal for insulation material. Hempcrete blocks have a low carbon footprint and are effectively carbon sinks. Widespread codes and specifications still need to be developed for the widespread usage of hempcrete, but it shows promise to replace current non-bearing construction materials that negatively impact the environment.

== See also ==
- Fiber-reinforced concrete
- Hemp as a building material
