= Drug policy of Germany =

The drug policy of Germany is considered to be one of the most lenient among European Union (EU) countries. Policies vary depending on the state.

== History ==
In 1994, the Federal Constitutional Court ruled that drug addiction and the possession of small quantities of narcotics for personal use were not crimes. In 2000, the German law on narcotics (Betäubungsmittelgesetz) was changed to allow supervised injection rooms.

In 2002, a pilot project was started in seven German cities to evaluate the effects of heroin-assisted treatment on addicts, compared to methadone-assisted treatment. In 2009, the positive results of the study led to heroin-assisted treatment becoming included in mandatory health insurance.

As of November 2010, the youth organisation of Alliance 90/The Greens, namely the Green Youth, support the decriminalisation of those who consume drugs and the regulated sale of drugs via specialist stores along with drug education.

In February 2021, authorities in Germany and Belgium seized more than 23 tonnes (23 long tons; 25 short tons) of cocaine, worth billions of euros, from shipments that originated in Paraguay and Panama. In an international operation that resulted in one arrest, a man from Vlaardingen, Netherlands, German and Belgian authorities seized the largest amount of cocaine in Europe.

== Cannabis policy ==
In 2017, Germany re-allowed medical cannabis. After the 2021 German federal election, the new government announced in their coalition agreement that they intend to legalise cannabis for all purposes (including recreational), and legislation to this effect was passed on 23 February 2024. The German cannabis control bill law went into effect on 1 April.

In March 2023, the former health minister, Karl Lauterbach, reported a positive reaction from European Commission on the plan, and intended to bring a bill forward soon.

The finalised bill received approval of the governing parties on 2 February 2024. The Bundestag passed the bill on 23 February 2024, and the Bundesrat approved it on 22 March, with the national legalisation to follow by 1 April. The final bill legislates that adults in Germany (those aged 18 and over) can legally use cannabis, possess and carry up to 25 grams (7/8 oz) of cannabis for personal possession in public and have up to 50 grams (1 3/4 oz) of dried cannabis at home. The legislation states that adults have a maximum purchase limit of 25 grams of cannabis a day and a monthly maximum purchase limit of 50 grams of cannabis. Each individual adult in Germany can also have up to three of their own cannabis plants at home. From 1 July 2024, adult residents of Germany will be allowed to join adult-only non-profit cannabis social clubs in Germany, with a maximum membership of 500. These cannabis social clubs will require permits. Consumption of cannabis inside and in a radius of less of 100 m from the entrances of schools, kindergartens, public playgrounds, public sports facilities, as well as in presence of minors and, between 7 am and 8 pm, in pedestrian zones in city centers will not be allowed.

== See also ==
- Anti-tobacco movement in Nazi Germany
- Doping in East Germany
- Drug liberalization § Germany
- Drug policy of Nazi Germany
- Drugs controlled by the German Betäubungsmittelgesetz
- Federal Institute for Drugs and Medical Devices – German medical regulatory agency
- List of German drug laws
