= Cannabis and the Canadian military =

The Canadian government announced in September 2018 that Canadian Armed Forces members will be allowed to use cannabis with some restrictions, following Canada's intent to legalize cannabis in October 2018.

== History ==
Speaking with CBC Canada in January 2018, Chief of Military Personnel Lieutenant General Chuck Lamarre stated that it was too soon to know if there will be limits on military use of cannabis. In response to the question as to whether military dining halls, which sell alcohol, will also sell cannabis, Lamarre said the issue has not yet been considered.

In February 2018, Chief of Defence Staff General Jonathan Vance stated that members of the CAF, particularly those in dangerous positions, will face some restrictions on cannabis usage, but it will not be a total ban on cannabis for CAF members.

In early September 2018, the Canadian government released a directive stating that servicemembers will be allowed to use cannabis following legalization in October, but with restrictions on use depending on the individual's duties. Per the new regulations, servicemembers may use legal cannabis, but must cease usage:

- 8 hours prior to duty: all personnel
- 24 hours prior to duty: anyone operating a weapon or vehicle
- 28 days before duty: members involved in high-risk activities such as high altitude parachuting, operating in a hyperbaric environment, and serving on military aircraft.
- while away on domestic or foreign operations (includes Class B & C service for reservists)

== See also ==
- Canadian Forces Drug Control Program
