= Cannabis in Germany =

Legality of cannabis in Europe Legal for recreational use Legal for medical use Illegal^{1}May include recent laws or court decisions which have not yet entered into effect.

Cannabis in Germany was legalised for recreational use by adults (aged 18 and over) on 1 April 2024, making Germany the ninth country to do so. It became the first major European Union member state to adopt nationwide legalisation. As of early 2024, an estimated 4.5 million Germans use cannabis.

The reform allows adults to possess limited amounts of cannabis and to cultivate a small number of plants for personal use. From July 2024, non-profit cannabis social clubs also became legal. Licensed commercial sales were excluded from the initial legislation, a decision that attracted criticism.

Implementation has been shaped by European Union law, requiring a phased approach and limiting the scope of commercial distribution. Future stages may include pilot projects for regulated sales.

== Medical cannabis ==
Dronabinol was rescheduled in 1994 from annex I to annex II of the Narcotic Drugs Act (Betäubungsmittelgesetz) to facilitate research. In 1998 it was moved from annex II to annex III, making it available by prescription. By contrast, Δ^{9}-THC remains listed in annex I.

Despite this, in certain cases patients were granted special permits by the federal drug authority to import natural cannabis through pharmacies. Manufacturing instructions for dronabinol preparations were published in the Neues Rezeptur-Formularium.

By February 2008, seven German patients were receiving medicinal cannabis legally, dispensed by pharmacies on prescription.

On 4 May 2016, the Cabinet of Germany approved legislation allowing cannabis use for seriously ill patients who had consulted a doctor and had no therapeutic alternative. Health Minister Hermann Gröhe presented the draft, which entered into force on 10 March 2017. Licences were issued by the Federal Institute for Drugs and Medical Devices to companies for cultivating medical cannabis and for importing it under EU Good Manufacturing Practice standards. From March 2017, seriously ill patients could obtain cannabis with a doctor's prescription, covered by health insurance.

== Politics ==
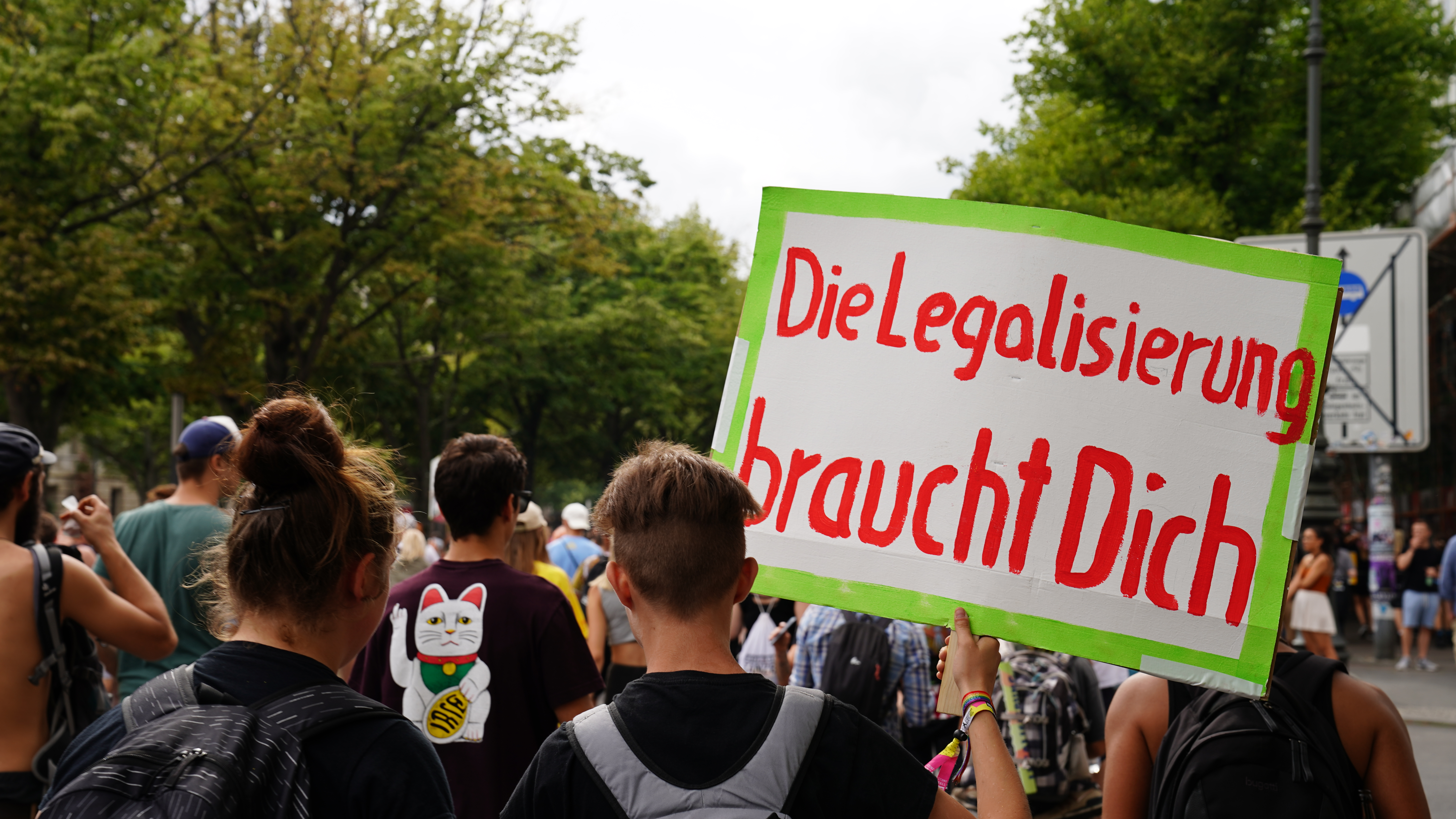
Hanfparade Berlin, 2019

The Greens, The Left, and the Free Democratic Party supported legalising cannabis for private consumption. They argued that this would protect consumers from adulterated products, reduce stigma, and prevent minors from accessing the drug through regulated shops with age checks.

=== 2021 German federal election ===
During coalition talks between the SPD, the Greens, and the FDP after the 2021 federal election, the parties agreed to legalise cannabis for recreational use through licensed shops.

These commitments were formalised in the coalition agreement. A 2021 study by the University of Düsseldorf estimated that a regulated cannabis market could generate €4.7 billion annually and create about 27,000 jobs.

In January 2022, Federal Minister of Justice Marco Buschmann stated that the ministry was drafting cannabis regulations, but the date of legalisation would be up to the Federal Ministry of Health. A 2022 German cannabis legalisation framework was introduced in October. The German health minister wants to make it legal for adults to purchase and own up to 30g (1 oz) of cannabis for recreational use and to privately grow up to three plants. Additionally, according to the plans, Cannabis Social Clubs with up to 500 members, may cultivate marijuana jointly for recreational use and sell it to members only for personal use. The draft bill was circulated on 28 April. In an interview published on 6 August 2023, Michael P. Seiter, Chief Advisor from the Bundestag, opined, "I currently suspect it will come soon, within the next 5–12 months. Chance – about 90%." According to an agreement, the legalization of cannabis possession and cultivation could take effect on 1 April 2024, with 50 grams (1¾ oz) of dried cannabis allowed for home cultivation. Some anticipate that this could lead to a tipping point for the entire EU.

=== 2023 efforts towards legalisation ===
In September 2023 the Bundesrat issued its first official statement on the Cannabis Act (Cannabisgesetz, CanG), which removed cannabis from the Narcotic Drugs Act. Health Minister Karl Lauterbach predicted the law could take effect by the end of 2023, while other Bundestag members expected early 2024.

The final draft permitted possession of up to 25g in public, 50g at home, and cultivation of up to three plants, either privately or through cultivation associations.

=== 2024 legalisation ===
On 23 February 2024, the Bundestag passed the Cannabis Act (407 votes in favour, 226 against, four abstentions). The Bundesrat approved it on 22 March.

The law legalised possession of up to 25 grams (0.88 oz) in public, 50 g (1.8 oz) at home, and cultivation of up to three plants. Adults aged 18–20 are restricted to 30 g (1.1 oz). From 1 July 2024, adults were permitted to join cannabis social clubs of up to 500 members, purchasing up to 50 g per month, although on-site consumption was prohibited.

The Act prohibits consumption within 100 metres (330 ft) of schools, kindergartens, playgrounds, sports facilities, and pedestrian zones in city centres between 07:00 and 20:00. It entered into force on 1 April 2024.

The impact on the illicit market remained debated, since commercial sale outside social clubs was still prohibited. The production and sale of cannabis edibles remained prohibited due to youth protection concerns, with penalties of up to three years in prison.

In spring 2025, Germany's government announced that they would not immediately change the Cannabis Act in 2025, but would carry out a re-evaluation in the fall.

== Hemp-based food and products ==
Non-psychoactive foods made with hemp seeds (containing less than 0.2% THC) are common in German health food shops such as Reformhaus. Since the late 2010s, hemp foods and drinks have become widely available in supermarkets and in drugstores such as dm and Rossmann. These stores also sell CBD products, typically THC-free cannabis extracts.

== Activism and protests ==
=== Hanfparade ===
The Hanfparade (English: Hemp Parade) is a hemp legalisation demonstration in Berlin. It has taken place annually since 1997.

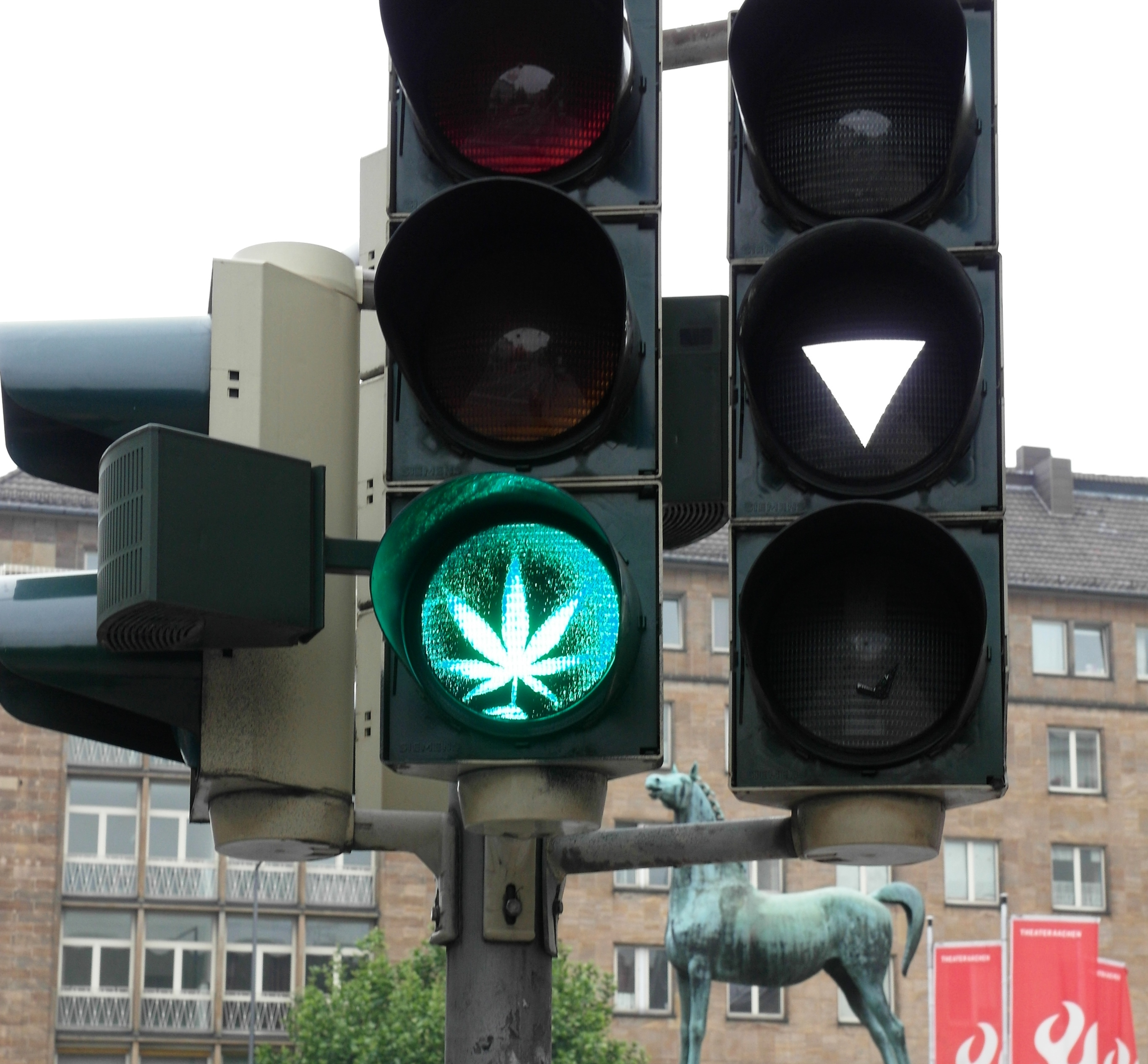
Stencil graffiti in Aachen.

=== Global Marijuana March ===
The Global Marijuana March has taken place in Germany since 2000 and has been coordinated since 2011 by the Deutscher Hanfverband (German Hemp Association).

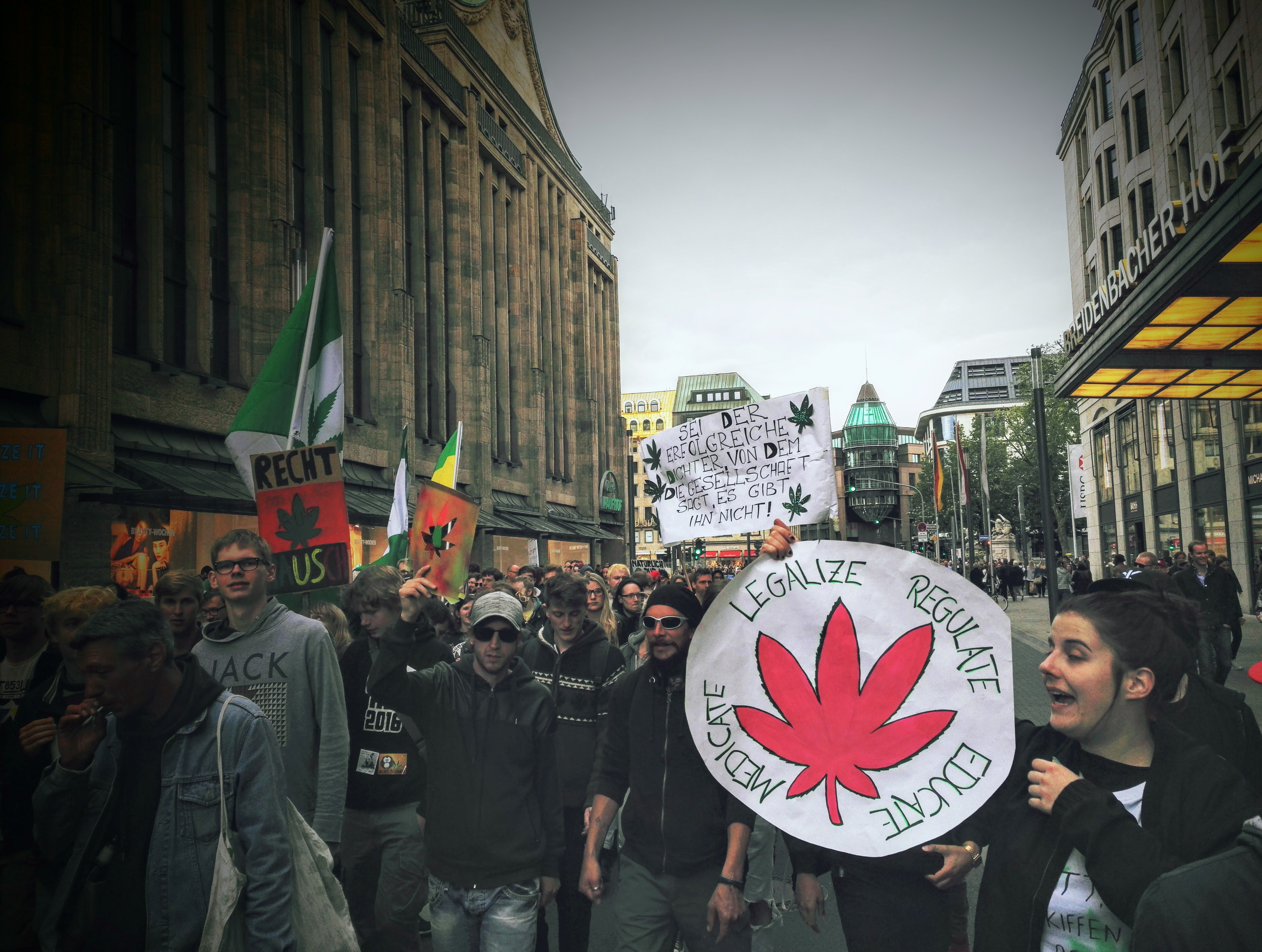
Global Marijuana March in Düsseldorf, 2016.

=== Other protests ===
In July 2023, the protest group "Who Are We Hurting?", led by Alec "Craze" Zammitt and Will Stolk, staged a publicity action in Berlin. The group distributed hundreds of fake cannabis plants throughout the city, similar to an earlier protest in Sydney in 2018.

== Culture ==
The Hanf Museum (Hemp Museum) was established in Berlin in 1994.
