= Michael P. Seiter =

Michael Patrick Seiter (born 8 October 1978) is a political consultant, journalist and snooker player. He is a former Liechtenstein national champion, having won the snooker championship in 2019.

== Life ==
Michael P. Seiter lives in both Liechtenstein and the USA. Professionally, he works internationally as a consultant, journalist, and manager. In 2021, he advised the FDP in the Bundestag, facilitating their entry into government. Seiter also works in the media sector, where he has collaborated with ProBonoTV, Ippen Media, and public figures including Ulrich Kienzle, Peter Scholl-Latour, and Mirko Drotschmann. He played a decisive role in the 2024 cannabis legalization negotiations in Germany. Later, in late 2024, he served as chief advisor in Basel's campaign for the cantonal government (Executive Council) of Basel-Stadt.

Seiter is also active in homelessness aid, organizing a major relief effort during the first winter of the COVID lockdowns alongside prominent figures. He is a recipient of the Jerusalem Pilgrim’s Cross. Additionally, he advocates for wildlife protection and the mobility transition, being one of the initiators of the Eco Grand Prix, a racing series aimed to support e-mobility.
