= Hemp in North Carolina =

Hemp was a crop since Colonial times in Southern Appalachia, including North Carolina, which exported "modest amounts". It ceased to be grown legally around 1940.

== Industrial Hemp Pilot Program (2017–) ==
In 2017, hemp farming in North Carolina was restarted as Industrial Hemp Pilot Program. The regulated, experimental program was authorized by state law conforming to the Federal 2014 Farm Bill's provisions for U.S. hemp production. In 2017, 1,000 acres (400 ha) of hemp were grown in the state. The planting was late due to DEA's refusal to allow transportation of U.S. hemp seed and non-issuance of a permit to import $200,000 of seed the state agriculture bought from Italian suppliers; instead, with a letter of authorization from the state Attorney General, two individuals drove a truck to Colorado and back with live plants for the state's first crop. The late planting and high heat were blamed by at least one farmer for loss of 95% of the 2017 crop.

The first processing facility for state-grown hemp opened at Asheboro in September 2017, producing dehulled seed, oil and CBD.
