= Cannabis tea =

Cannabis-infused drink

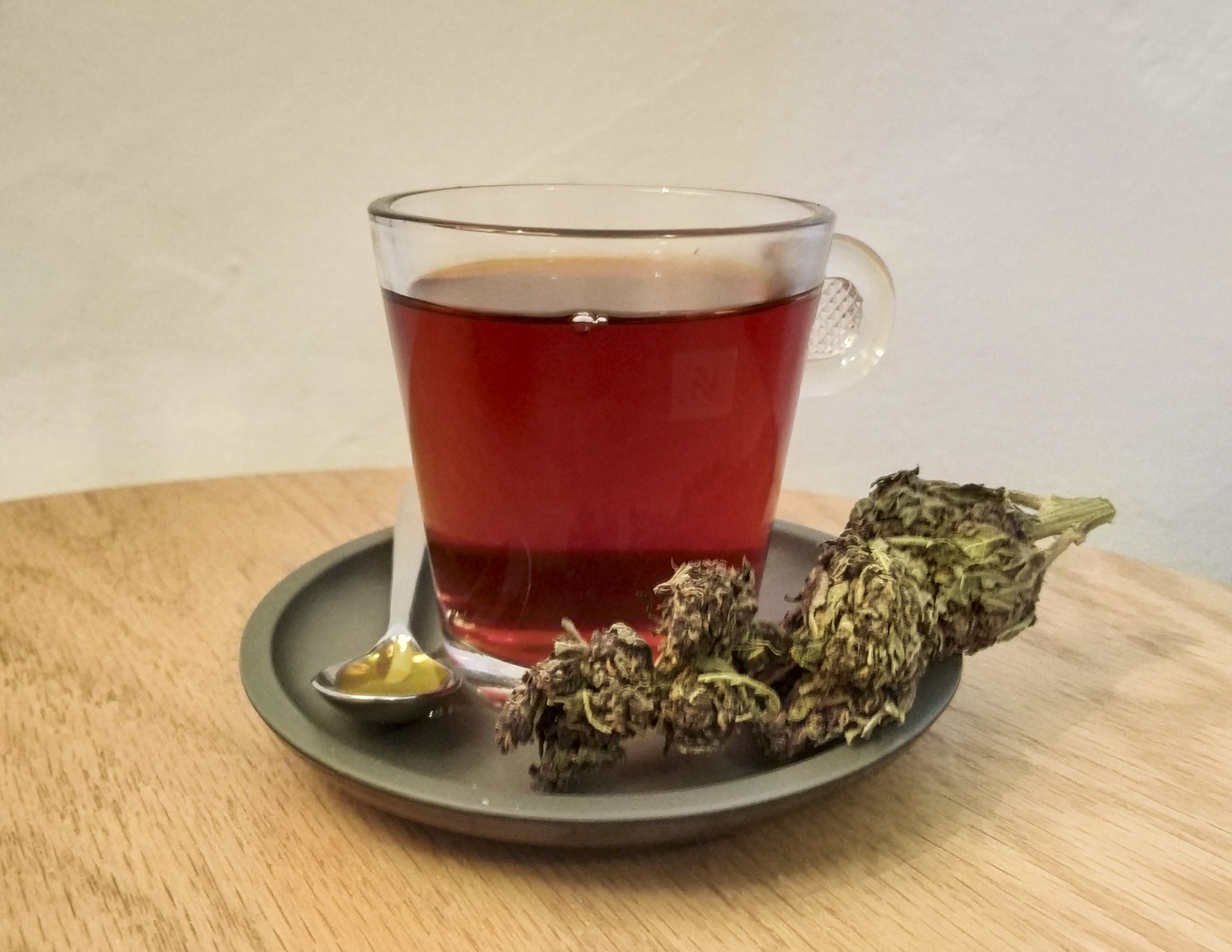
Cannabis tea with cinnamon and a spoonful of agave honey

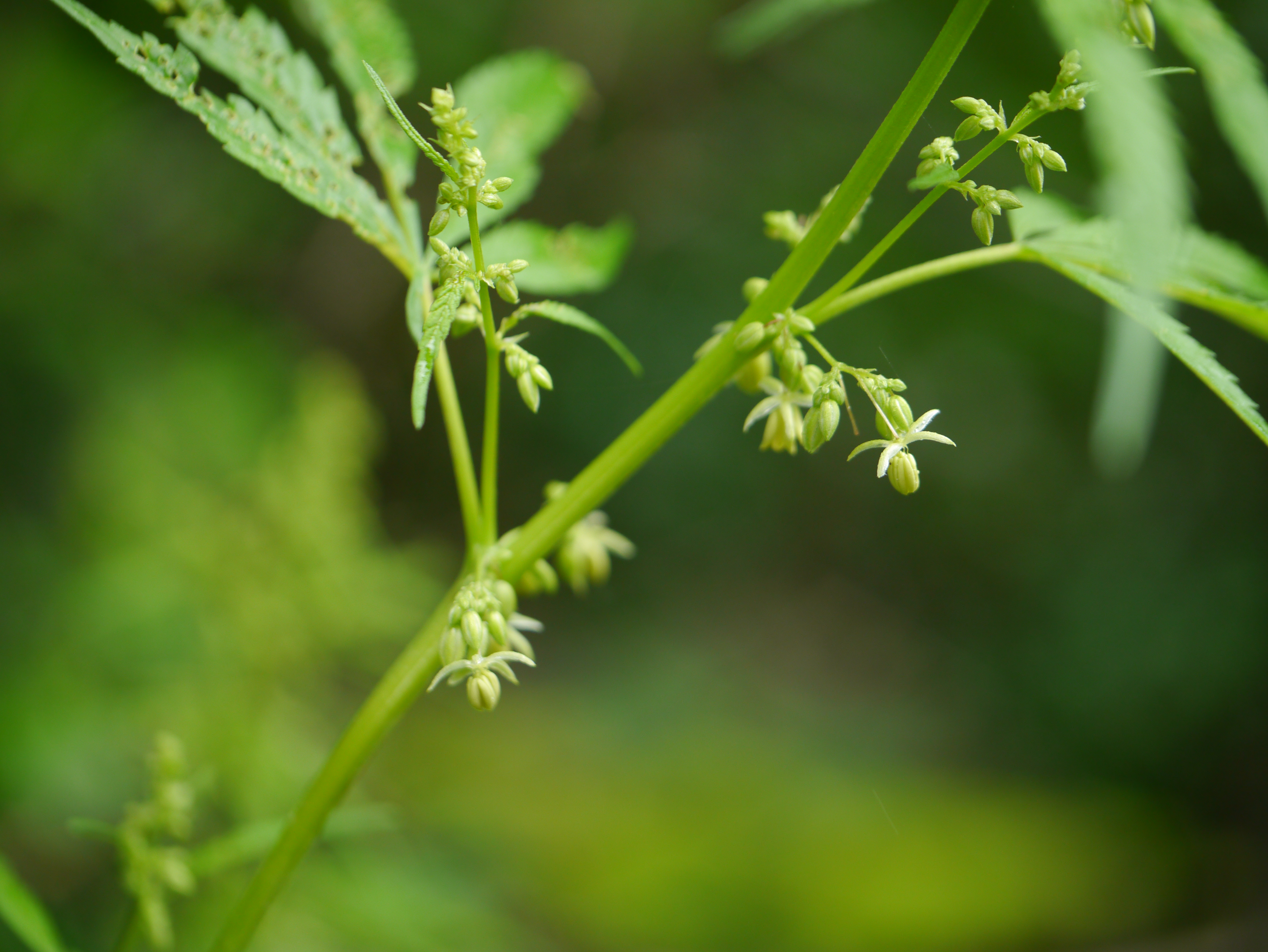
Male flower tops

Cannabis tea (also known as weed tea, pot tea, a cannabis decoction) is a cannabis-infused drink prepared by steeping various parts of the cannabis plant in hot or cold water. Cannabis tea is commonly recognized as an alternative form of preparation and consumption of the cannabis plant, more popularly known as marijuana, pot, or weed. This plant has long been recognized as an herbal medicine employed by health professionals worldwide to ease symptoms of disease, as well as a psychoactive drug used recreationally and in spiritual traditions. Though less commonly practiced than popular methods like smoking or consuming edibles, drinking cannabis tea can produce comparable physical and mental therapeutic effects. Such effects are largely attributed to the THC and CBD content of the tea, levels of which are drastically dependent on individual preparation techniques involving volume, amount of cannabis, and boiling time. Also in common with these administration forms of cannabis is the heating component performed before usage. Due to the rather uncommon nature of this particular practice of cannabis consumption in modern times (in contrast to historical use) as well as the legality of cannabis throughout the world, the research available on the composition of cannabis tea is limited and based broadly around what is known of cannabis as it exists botanically.

== Composition ==
According to a 2007 study published in the Journal of Ethnopharmacology, the composition of cannabis tea is affected by criteria including, but not limited to, the duration of time over which the cannabis is steeped, the volume of tea prepared, and the period of time for which the tea is stored before consumption. The study mentions the ways in which levels of THC and THCA impact variability of composition by changing the bioactivity of the beverage. Therefore, cannabis teas that include less bioactive cannabinoids, "based on HPLC peak area" will demonstrate varying compositions.

== Preparation ==
According to a 2017 study on cannabinoid concentration and stability in preparations of cannabis oil and tea, a boiling period of fifteen minutes was found to be sufficient in order to reach the highest concentrations of cannabinoids in tea solutions. However, preparation of cannabis oil in the study was found to ensure a higher stability of cannabinoids than that which was found in preparation of cannabis tea.

To produce psychoactive effects, cannabis used in tea must first be decarboxylated. As with regular tea, spices are often added. Typically, the tea is allowed to simmer for 5–10 minutes.

== Folk medicine ==
Cannabis tea was used for centuries in folk medicine as it was thought to be a treatment for rheumatism, cystitis, and various urinary diseases.

In an article in Nature, it is projected that cannabis has been used medicinally for nearly 12,000 years. The oldest confirmed reference to medicinal cannabis is ~2700 BC, in Ancient China. There is ~190AD evidence that a Chinese physician, Hua T'o, used an emulsion of tea and wine to anesthetize a patient for surgery.

According to a short communication published in the Journal of Ethnopharmacology, based on the research of Zias et al. regarding cannabis use in ancient childbirth, cannabis is said to have been used to assist women during childbirth. The communication is regarding an anthropological find of a birthing mother, dated to the 4th century AD., "We assume that the ashes found in the tomb were cannabis, burned in a vessel and administered to the young girl as an inhalant to facilitate the birth process." Cannabis tea has been traditionally used by Jamaican women as a remedy for morning sickness associated with pregnancy. There is no evidence that cannabis is an abortive medicine."

== Legal status ==
Cannabis tea is controlled as a derivative of cannabis in most countries as is required of countries whose governments are party to the United Nations' Single Convention on Narcotic Drugs. However, similar to the regulation surrounding alcohol content of kombucha, there are some forms of cannabis tea with cannabis levels considered to be highly undetectable. These variations of the drink do not contain the psychoactive cannabinoid known as THC (delta-9-tetrahydrocannabinol) and, instead, contain the non-psychoactive cannabinoids cannabidiol (CBD) or cannabinol (CBN)—both of which tend to go undetected in cannabis use/intoxication drug tests. As such, the legal status of cannabis tea is largely dependent on its composition and preparation.

=== United States ===
Cannabis tea is scheduled at the federal level in the United States by nature of being a derivative of Cannabis sativa, and it is therefore illegal to possess, buy, and sell. Due to variances in statewide laws, and the reluctance of the federal government to overrule the states, however, the federal legislation has little impact on nationwide use, and is "generally applied only against persons who possess, cultivate, or distribute large quantities of cannabis". As such, regulation of recreational and/or medicinal growth and use on an individual level is not the responsibility of the federal government.

==== Colorado law ====
In Colorado, for medical purposes, cannabis tea is a "Medical Marijuana Infused Product" which is "a product infused with medical marijuana that is intended for use or consumption other than by smoking, including edible products, ointments, and tinctures. These products, when manufactured or sold by a licensed medical marijuana center or a medical marijuana-infused product manufacturer, shall not be considered a food or drug for the purposes of the "Colorado Food and Drug Act", part 4 of article 5 of title 25, C.R.S." Colorado currently stands as one of 33 states that have laws legalizing marijuana as of 2018.

== Adverse effects ==
Although not as widely published as the beneficial, therapeutic effects of cannabis tea, adverse effects of consumption have been found to exist, in addition to the known adverse effects of cannabis use in general. Based upon the findings of select studies, it appears as though such effects occur mainly as a result of unconventional methods or dosage used when interacting with the decoction.
