= Cannabis Act (Germany) =

German cannabis legislation passed in 2024

Cannabisgesetz
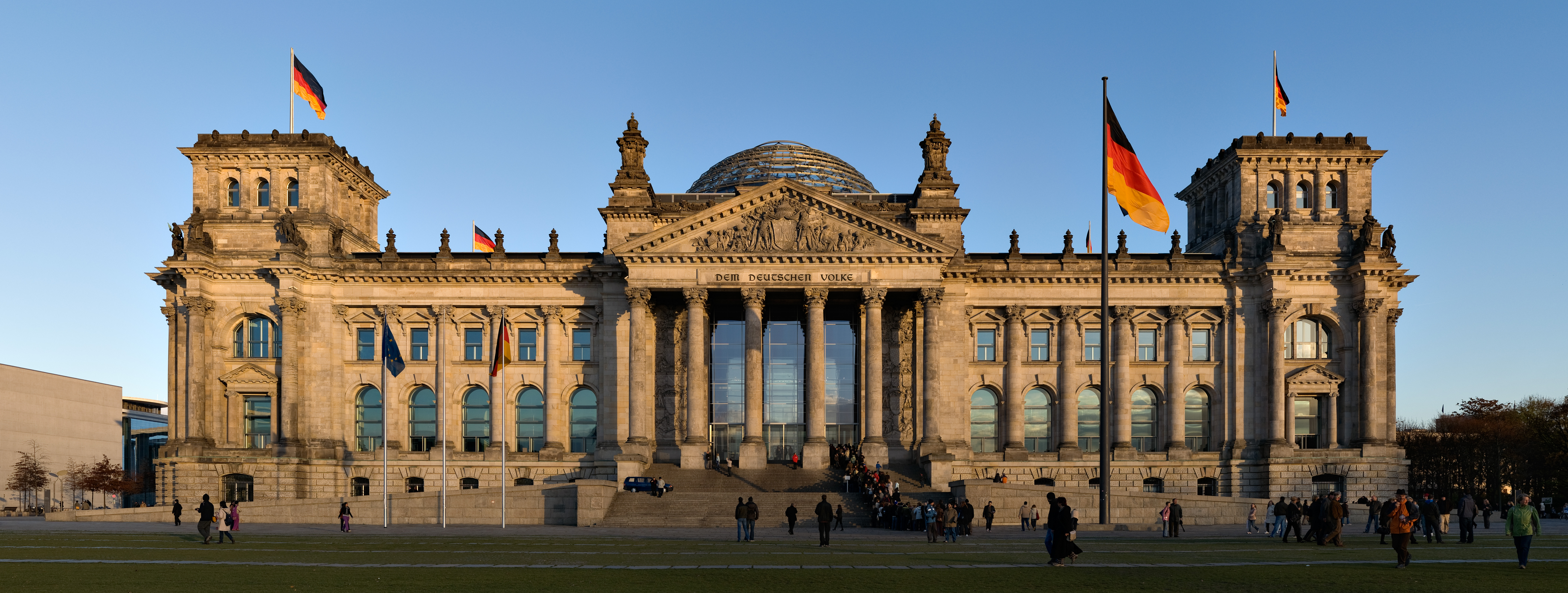

Bundestag
- Long title: Gesetz zum kontrollierten Umgang mit Cannabis und zur Änderung weiterer Vorschriften
- Territorial extent: Germany
- Enacted by: Bundestag
- Enacted: 27 March 2024
- Commenced: 1 April 2024
- Status: In force

The Cannabis Act (Cannabisgesetz) is a German law passed by the Bundestag in February 2024 and the Bundesrat in March 2024 that legalised the possession, cultivation, and use of cannabis by adults aged 18 and over. The law took effect on 1 April 2024, allowing adults to possess up to 25 grams of cannabis in public and up to 50 grams of dried cannabis at home, as well as to cultivate up to three plants for personal use. From 1 July 2024, adult-only non-profit cannabis social clubs with a maximum of 500 members also became legal.

== 2015 proposal ==
Entwurf eines Cannabiskontrollgesetzes (CannKG; "Draft of a cannabis control law") was a bill proposed in 2015 that would remove cannabis from the list of scheduled drugs in Germany's Narcotic Drugs Act. The issue was proposed by Alliance 90/The Greens (the German Green Party) on 20 March 2015. It would regulate cannabis in a manner similar to alcohol, with adults 18 years old permitted to buy and possess up to 30 grams in regulated stores.

== 2022 proposal ==
A new regulatory framework that would legalise cannabis in Germany was brought out with an Eckpunktepapier ("cornerstone paper", or framework paper), introduced on 26 October 2022 by Minister of Health and member of the Bundestag, Karl Lauterbach, who is a physician and epidemiologist trained in the United States and Germany.

The 2022 deregulation proposal was leaked around 19 October 2022.

== 2023 proposal ==
In March 2023, the former health minister, Karl Lauterbach, reported a positive reaction from European Commission on the plan, and intended to bring a bill forward soon.

The finalised bill received approval of the governing parties on 2 February 2024. The Bundestag passed the bill on 23 February 2024, and the Bundesrat approved it on 22 March, with the national legalisation to follow by 1 April. The final bill legislates that adults in Germany (those aged 18 and over) can legally use cannabis, possess and carry up to 25 grams (7/8 oz) of cannabis for personal possession in public and have up to 50 grams (1 3/4 oz) of dried cannabis at home. The legislation states that adults have a maximum purchase limit of 25 grams of cannabis a day and a monthly maximum purchase limit of 50 grams of cannabis. Each individual adult in Germany can also have up to three of their own cannabis plants at home. From 1 July 2024, adult residents of Germany will be allowed to join adult-only non-profit cannabis social clubs in Germany, with a maximum membership of 500. These cannabis social clubs will require permits. Consumption of cannabis inside and in a radius of less of 100 m from the entrances of schools, kindergartens, public playgrounds, public sports facilities, as well as in presence of minors and, between 7 am and 8 pm, in pedestrian zones in city centers will not be allowed.

=== Development ===
Details of a leaked version of a new scaled-back plan were published by German newspaper Die Zeit in late March. The new plan would have experimental controlled legalization in sub-national areas.

The new plan was officially announced on 12 April. Provisions included legal possession of up to 25 grams of cannabis, and home- or club-grown cannabis, but did not allow large-scale commercial production and sale of the plant.

The proposal was accepted by the federal cabinet on 16 August to be submitted to parliament. If it goes through as planned by the health ministry, the law could be in effect as early as the beginning of 2024. It survived a challenges by German states in the Bundesrat in late September, prior to its being taken up by the Bundestag.

A version of the bill agreed to by the then German governing coalition, the traffic light coalition, was released on 27 November 2023, with a vote planned soon to allow for legal possession by adults by 1 April 2024. A vote on the bill was considered likely to pass by 1 December. Health minister Lauterbach said in January 2024 that the bill would be passed by the Bundestag in the week between 19 and 23 February and then go into force on 1 April.

According to a YouGov poll in February 2024, 42% of Germans stated that they either somewhat or completely support the bill, while 47% of respondents said they somewhat or completely oppose the bill.

=== Reception ===
The issuance of the draft regulations by the Ministry of Health was called a "decisive step toward legalization" by Politico.

The Deutscher Hanfverband (German Hemp Association) criticised the 15% THC limit in the leaked draft.

The bill has been criticised by many in the Social Democratic Party of Germany (SPD) because it does not allow for the control of cannabis via sales from licensed stores, which they state would tackle organised crime and reduce the burden on the police. A 2021 study from the University of Düsseldorf concluded that legal sales of recreational cannabis in Germany could raise over $5.3 billion in additional yearly tax revenue and create 27,000 jobs in the country.

The opposition CDU/CSU said if they form a government after the 2025 German federal election they will completely scrap the bill. The conservative Christian Social Union in Bavaria government wanted to see if it could take a legal route to stop the implementation of the bill.

=== Provisions ===
Provisions of the October 2022 framework paper include sales in licensed establishments, and personal possession by adults over 18 years of 20 to 30 grams of cannabis without THC content limit. There may be sales limitations regarding persons under 21 years of age.

=== Effect ===
The ministry document is intended to have direct effect under Directive (EU) 2015/1535. Germany said it would present the framework paper to the European Union before implementing legislation.

By October 2025 the ministry had come to the conclusion that fraud was happening with the "Medical Cannabis Act", which is Article 2 of the "Cannabis Act". When comparing the rise in prescriptions for cannabis with the statutory health insurance, in the one digit percentage, to the rise in imports of medical cannabis, some 400 percent from 19 to 80 tonnes in the same time frame, the imbalance was obvious. On 8 October 2025 an amendment was introduced, making a consultation in person with a doctor now mandatory for getting a cannabis prescription. For follow up prescriptions, a patient now needs a new consultation in person with a doctor every year and shipping of medical cannabis is prohibited, with pharmacy delivery services excluded. The final vote on the amendment in the Bundestag is expected in early 2026.

== See also ==
- Cannabis in Germany
- Drug policy of Germany
- Hanfparade
- Legality of cannabis
- Outline of cannabis
