= Hemp milk =

Beverage made from soaked and ground hemp seeds

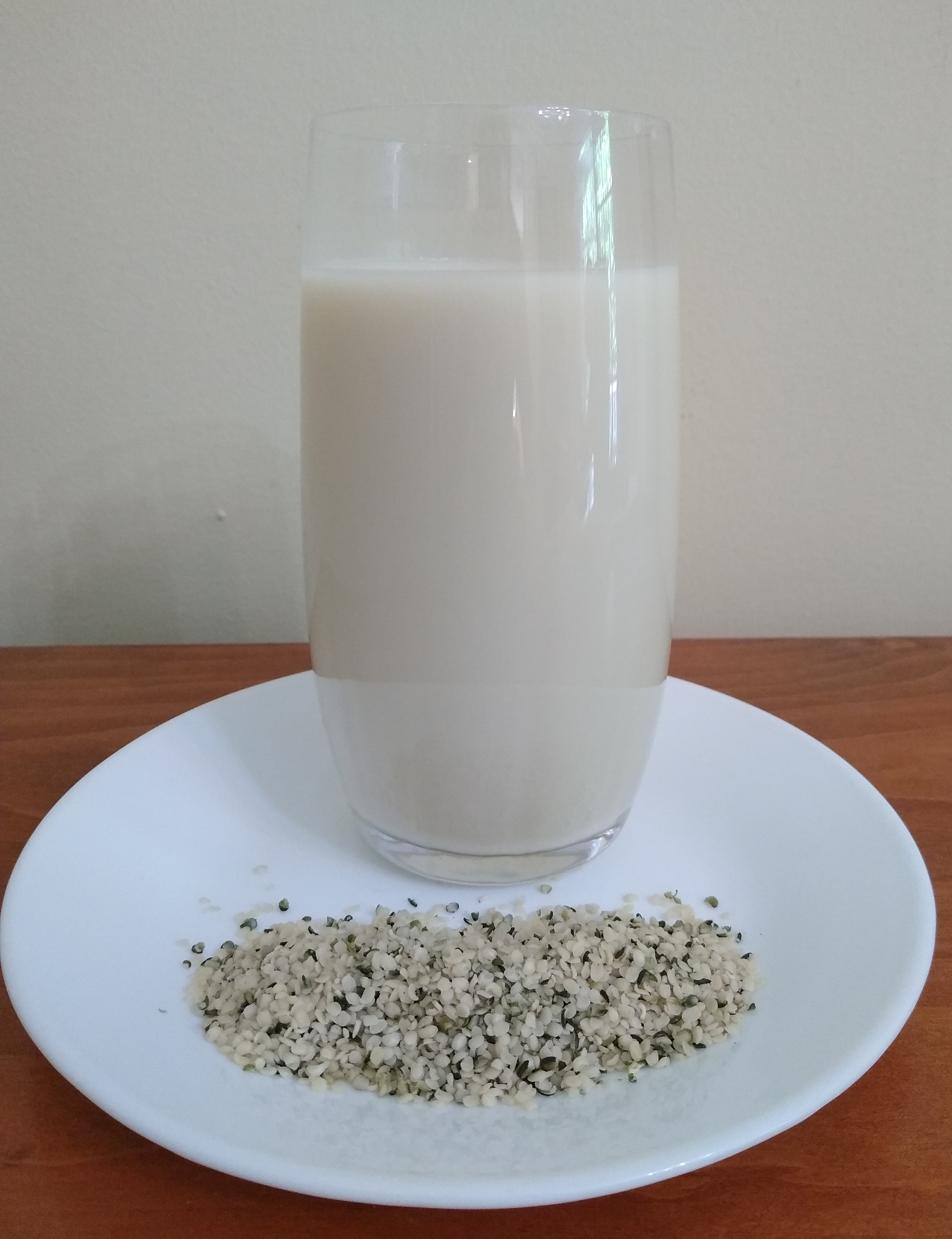
- A glass of hemp milk, pictured with hemp seeds
- Alternative names: Hemp seed milk

Hemp milk, or hemp seed milk, is a plant milk made from hemp seeds that are soaked and ground in water. The result resembles milk in colour, texture, and flavour. Hemp is conducive to being organically grown and labelled. Plain hemp milk may be additionally sweetened or flavoured.

Compared to soy milk, in coffee culture hemp milk is said to produce better latte art and to have a texture more like cow's milk.

== Production ==
Production of hemp milk requires hemp seeds, water, and a blender or juicer. Many recipes call for ground vanilla or vanilla extract to add flavour, and a type of sweetener. Once all the ingredients are blended together, some people pour the hemp milk through a cheesecloth and strainer to get a smoother and more refined milky texture, but this process is optional.

== Nutrition ==
In a 100 millilitres (3.5 imp fl oz; 3.4 US fl oz) serving, hemp milk provides 46 calories from 3 g of carbohydrates, 3 g of fat and 2 g of protein. Hemp milk contains no micronutrients in significant amounts. Although there is limited history of making hemp milk, hemp seeds have been eaten for a long time, and hemp milk is safe for those concerned about soy or milk allergies.
