= Shives =

Wooden refuse product from fiber processing

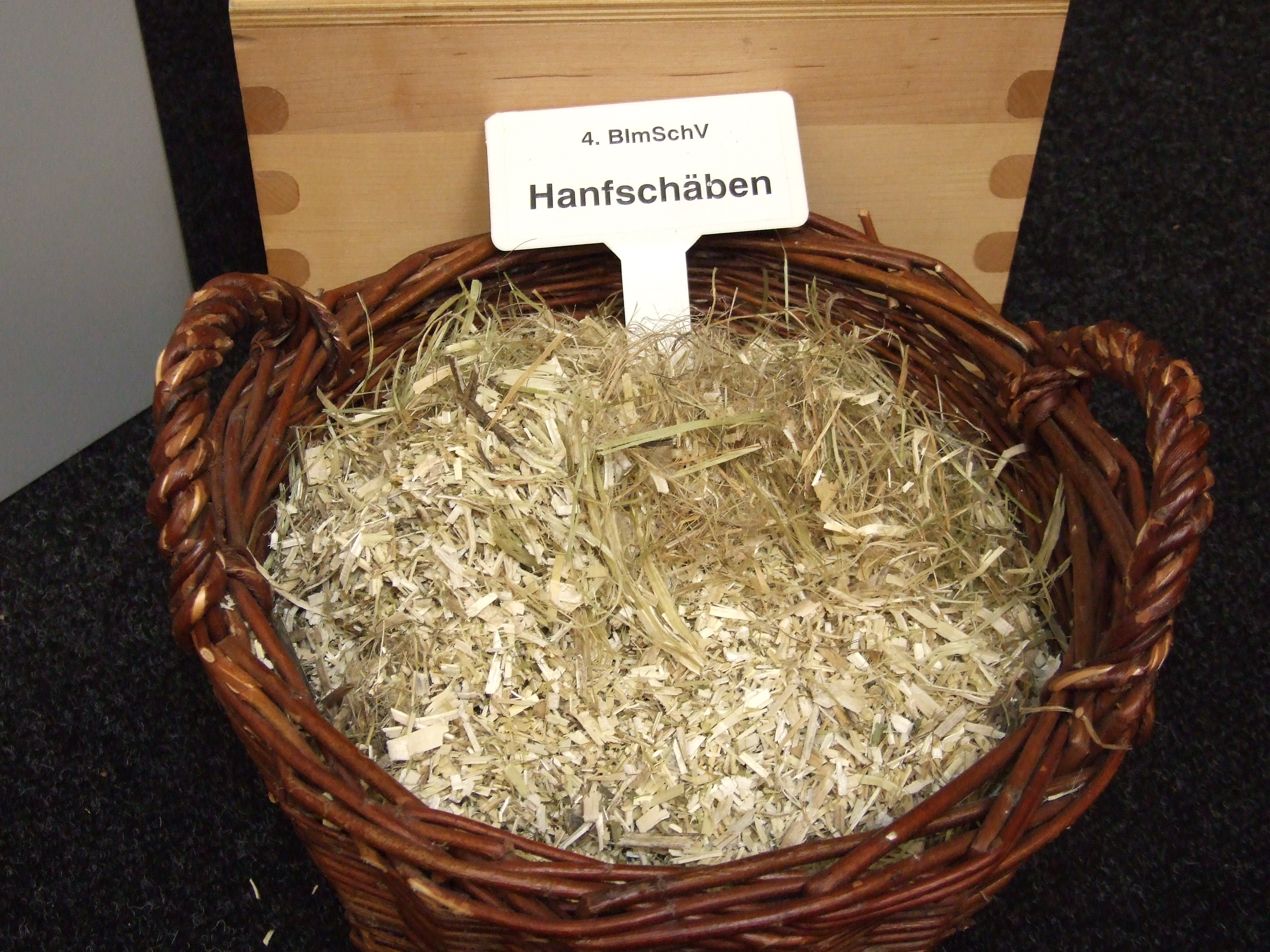
Raw hemp shives

Shives, also known as shoves, boon or hurd, are the wooden refuse removed during processing flax, hemp, or jute, as opposed to the fibres (known as tow). Shives consist of "the woody inner portion of the hemp stalk, broken into pieces and separated from the fiber in the processes of breaking and scutching" and "correspond to the shives in flax, but are coarser and usually softer in texture". Shives are a by-product of fiber production.

== Decortication ==
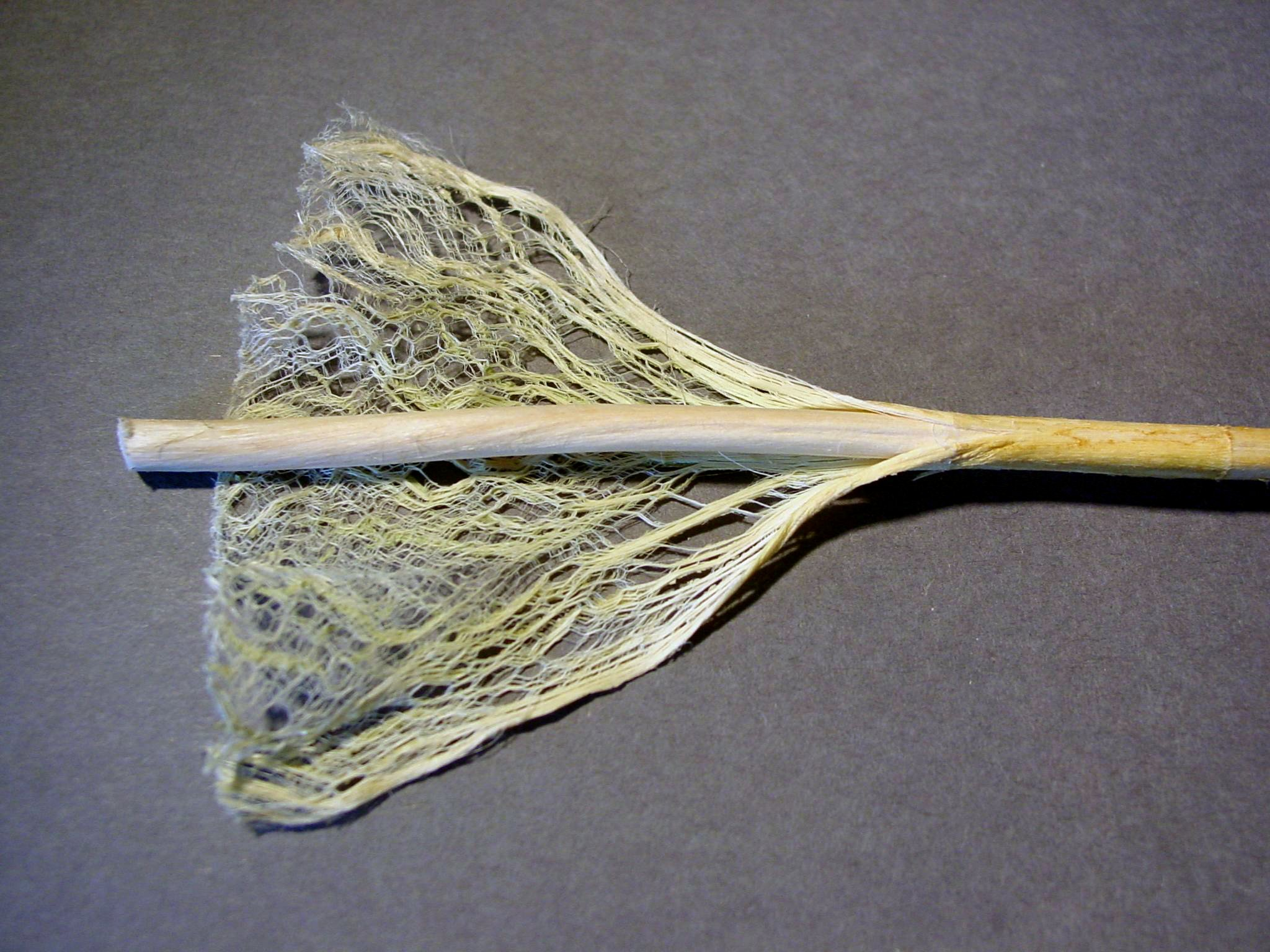
A partly decorticated hemp straw, with a central core of shive surrounded by one of tow

Decortication separates bast fiber from the shive. The fine bast fiber is used to make textiles. Decortication is accomplished by manually crushing, a labor-intensive process, or by a hemp decorticator machine.

== Uses ==
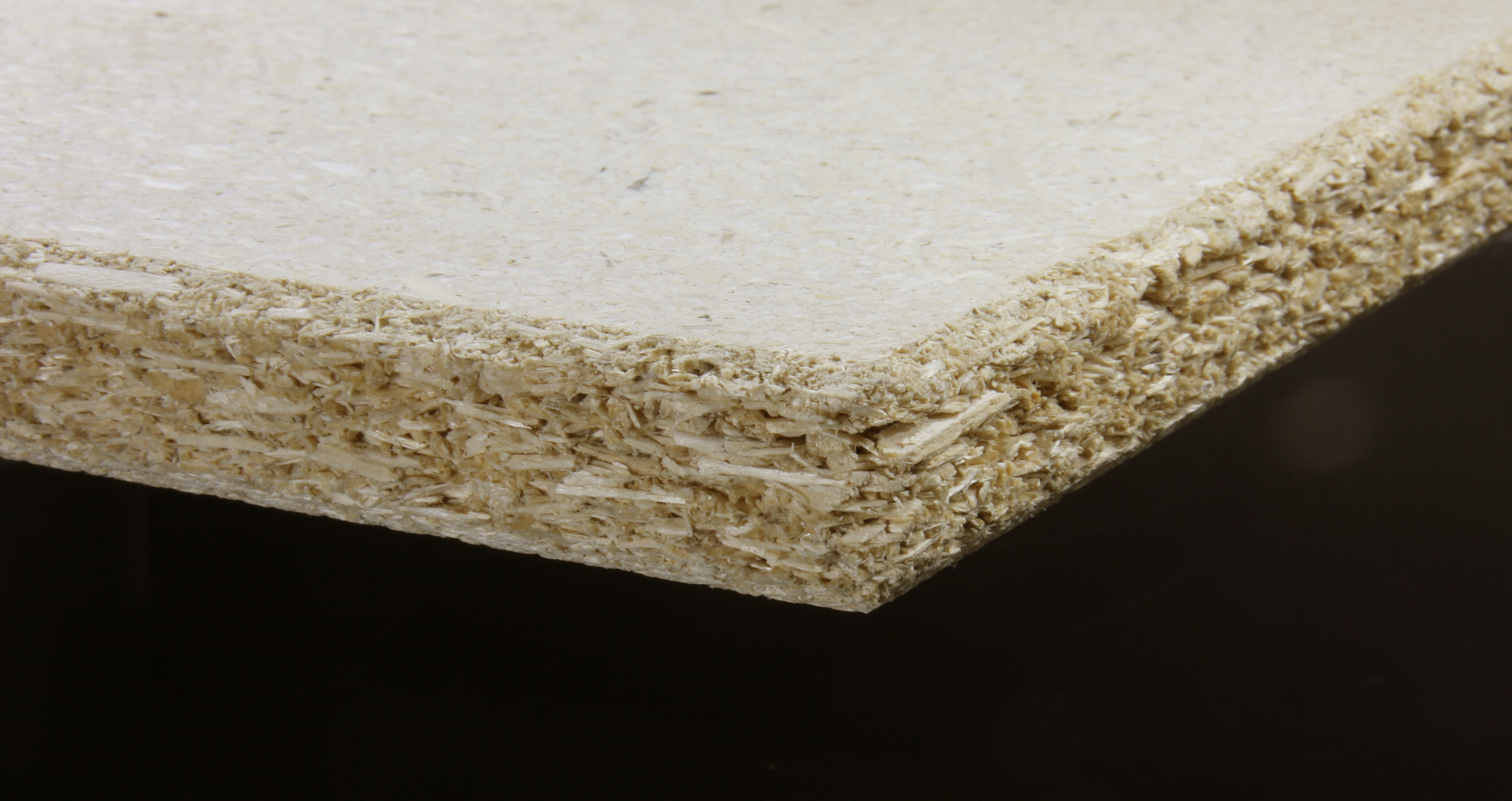
Particleboard made from hemp shives

Shives can be used as stock in papermaking; particleboard, hempcrete, and other construction composites; or bedding for animals, particularly in horse stalls, which is the most common use (by weight) in Europe.

== Development of water-repellent coatings ==
Hemp shives are a renewable organic raw material used for the production of insulation boards. The use of biomaterials for insulation boards in walls is attracting increasing interest, but wider acceptance in the construction industry has so far been slowed-down by adverse material properties. Because such materials consist mainly of cellulose, they are flammable and their hydrophilic surface leads to high water uptake, which can lead to mold or rot.

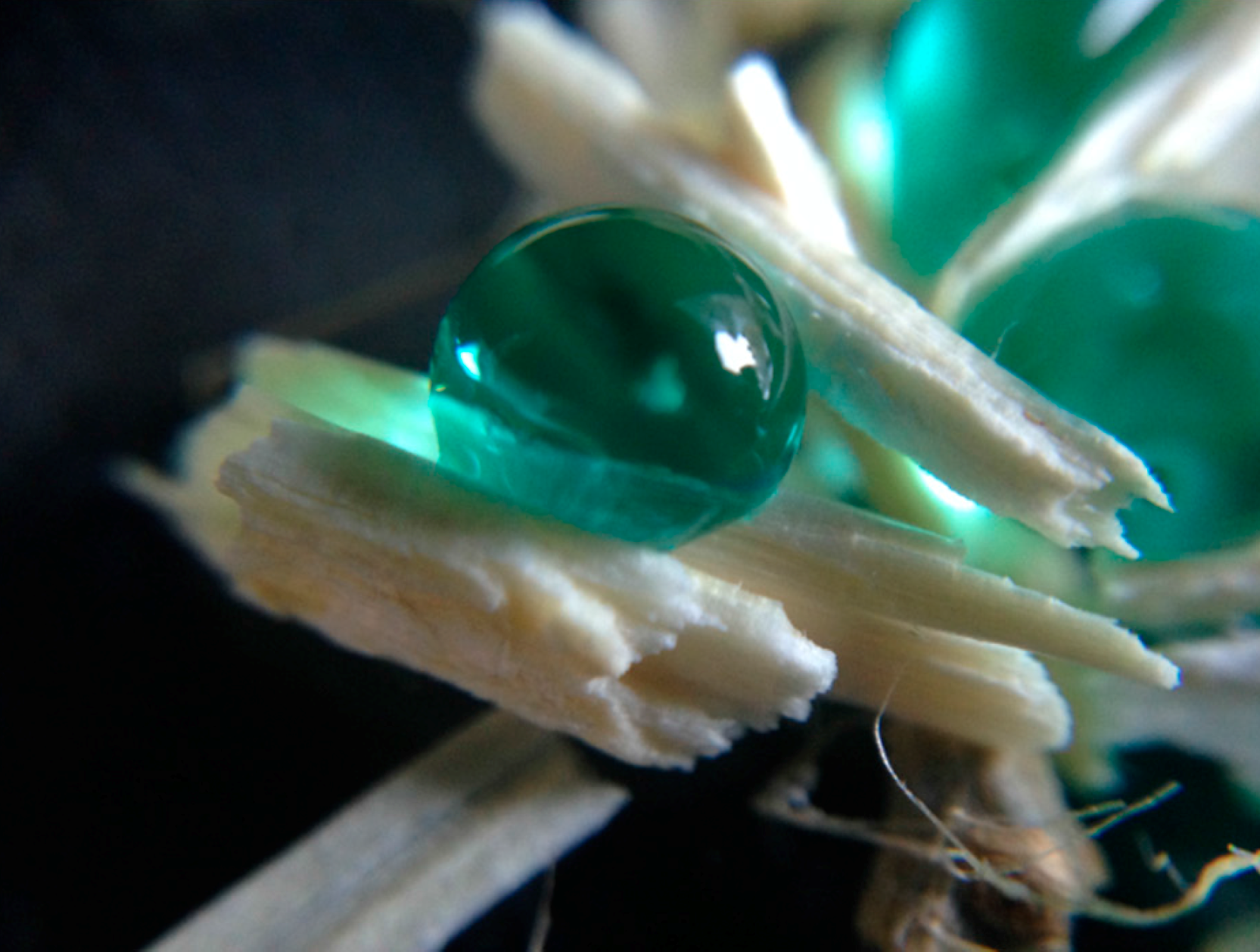
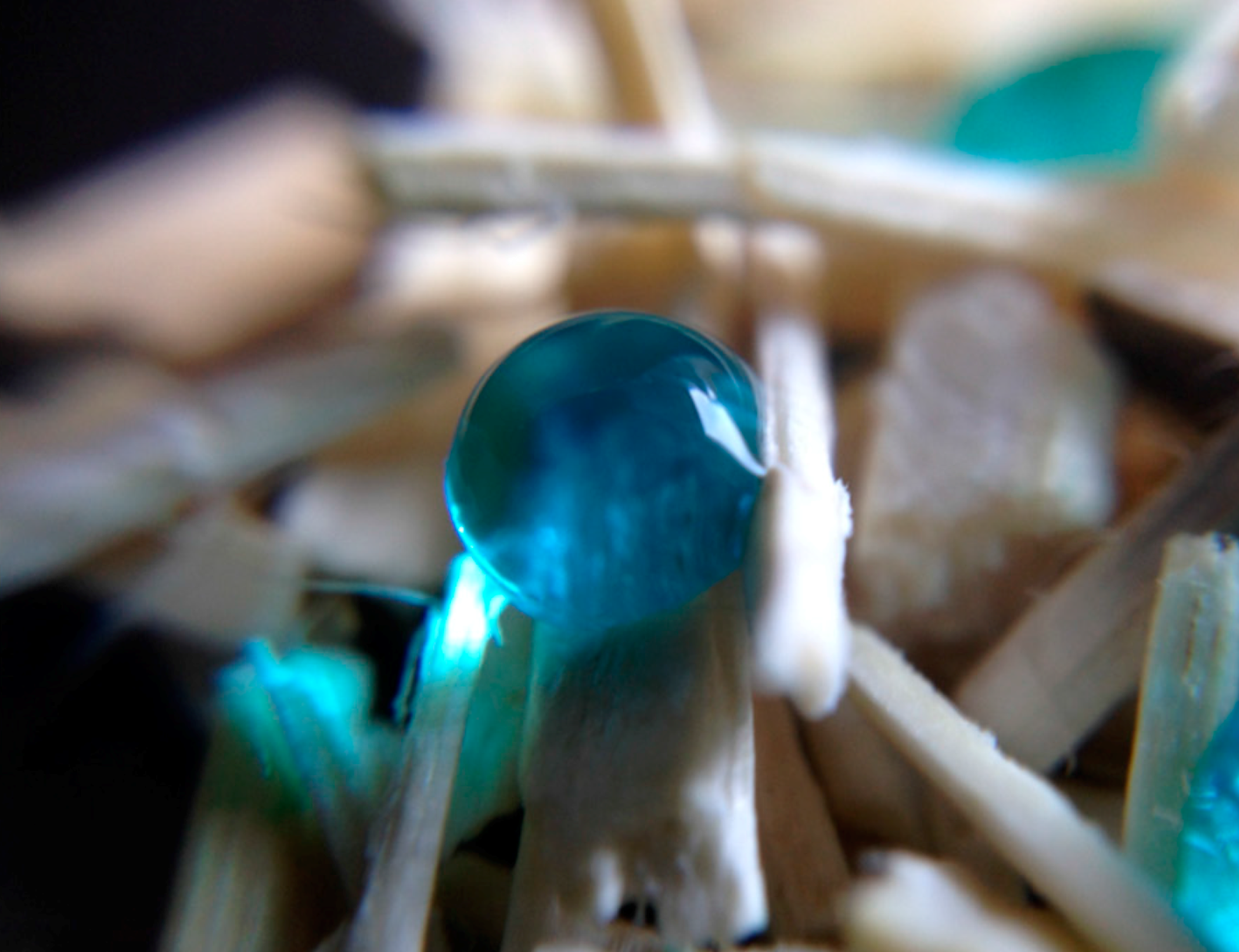
Development of water-repellent silica particles to protect hemp shives used as insulating material. Dyed water droplets on a silica-coated hemp shive specimen sample having a water contact angle greater than 125°.

Therefore, engineering studies have investigated whether a coating with a water-repellent thin film provides the desired benefits. For the hydrophobic coating with silica particles, a colloidal sol-gel dispersion was successfully synthesized by the Stöber process, characterized and deposited on hemp shives. These samples passed a 72-hour test in the humidity chamber without loss of their hydrophobic property and no signs of mold growth.

When hemp shive was coated several times with functionalized silica particles, uniform and complete coverage of the surface was achieved. The treatment provided the hemp shive with comprehensive water repellency: the hydrophilic character of the untreated hemp shive was modified to durably hydrophobic, once the bio-materials were coated with functionalised silica particles. Mould growth was delayed during exposure to humidity, whilst the liquid water repellent property of the treated hemp shive was maintained despite the humid conditions. The treatment developed in this study could be a viable solution for use on bio-materials that need to repel liquid water, whilst preserving the integrity of the insulation panel in common environmental conditions. There are of course still further tests to be carried out before adopting this treatment in the construction sector, such as additional moisture, mechanical, and biodegradation tests. However, the promising results described here give a good first assessment of feasibility. Before being fully adopted in the construction sector, these treatments and materials must be fully tested in accordance with the building codes. In addition, with the recent use of biomaterials, new standards and test methods for these specific materials should be developed.
