= Chemical defenses in Cannabis =

Defense of Cannabis plant from pathogens

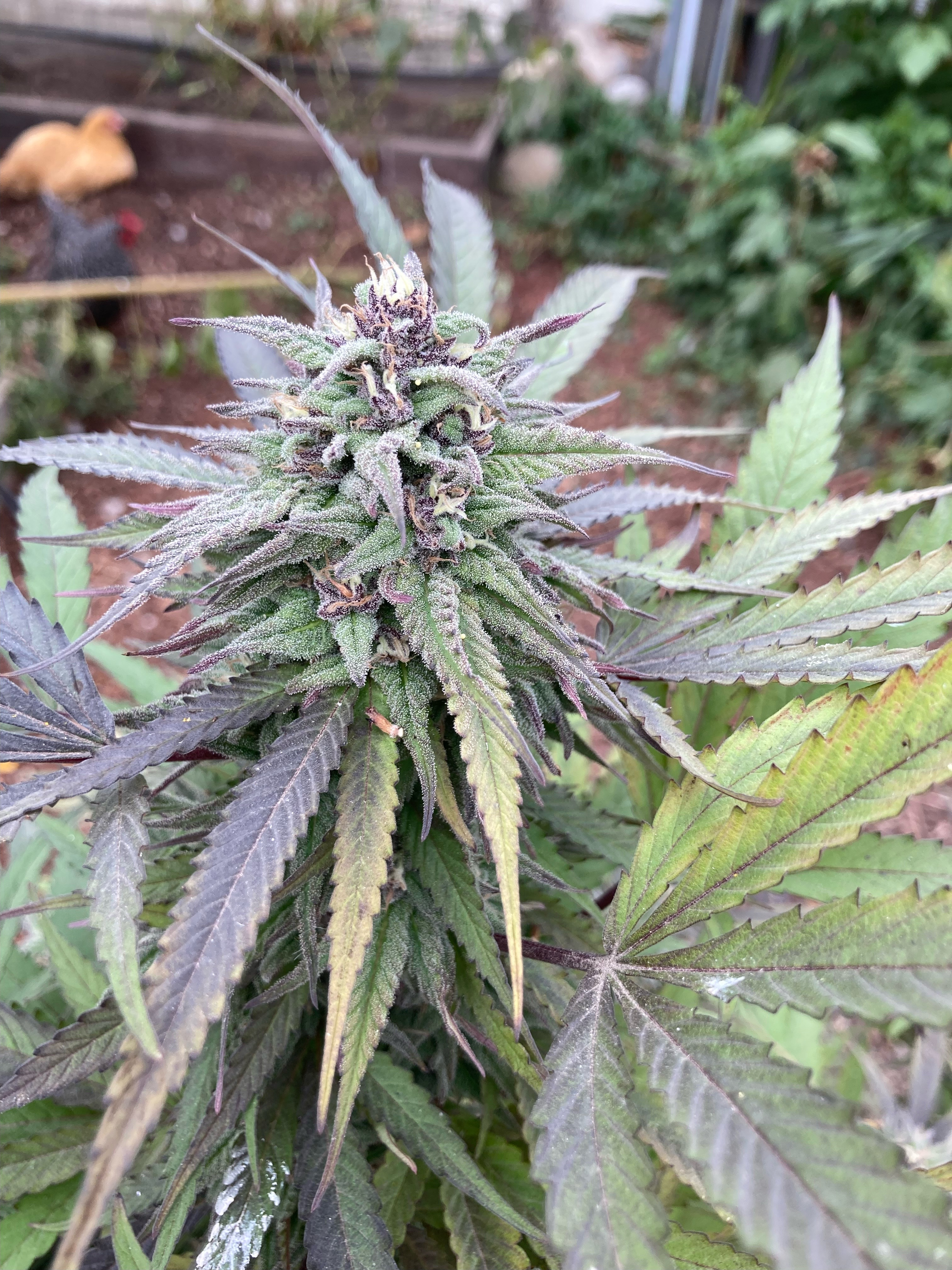
Close up of a Cannabis plant

Cannabis (/ˈkænəbɪs/) as a recreational drug is grown in the form of two plant species: Cannabis sativa and Cannabis indica. Both produce chemicals to deter herbivorous animals. The chemical composition includes specialized terpenes and cannabinoids, mainly tetrahydrocannabinol (THC), and cannabidiol (CBD). These substances play a role in defending the plant from pathogens including insects, fungi, viruses and bacteria. THC and CBD are stored mostly in the trichomes of the plant, and can cause psychological and physical impairment in the user, via the endocannabinoid system and unique receptors. THC increases dopamine levels in the brain, which attributes to the euphoric and relaxed feelings cannabis provides. As THC is a secondary metabolite, it poses no known effects towards plant development, growth, and reproduction. However, some studies show secondary metabolites such as cannabinoids, flavonoids, and terpenes are used as defense mechanisms against biotic and abiotic environmental stressors.

== Biosynthesis pathways ==
=== Cannabinoids ===
The production of the cannabinoids THC and CBD are a result of a series of chemical reactions, and are just two types of over a hundred that are known. Inside the transcriptomes of glandular trichomes in the cannabis plant, the pathway for cannabinoid production takes place. Beginning with the formation of 3,5,7-trioxododecaneoyl-COA by the condensation reaction between hexanoyl-CoA and malonyl-CoA, catalyzed by type III polyketide synthase (PKS), the product is then used to form olivetolic acid. After the geranylation of olivetolic acid, cannabigerolic acid (CBGA) or cannabigerivarinic acid (CBGVA) is formed. The decarboxylation of these acids yield what we recognize as THC and CBD.

=== Terpenes ===
Terpenes are a key component in chemotaxonomical classification of cannabis strains as terpene composition is a phenotypic trait. Majority of terpenes found in cannabis are hydrocarbons, which are a direct product of terpene synthase (TPS) enzymes. The molecular make up of terpenes in a cannabis plant involves the linking and elongation of chains in hydrocarbons and isoprene units, formed by isopentenyl pyrophosphate and dimethylallyl pyrophosphate. Terpenoids are basically terpenes with the addition of oxygen, among other structural additions. There are numerous types of unique functional terpenes in green plants and are formed via many differing pathways; methylerythritol phosphate (MEP), cytosolic mevalonate (MEV), or deoxyxylulose phosphate pathway (DOXP) to name a few. In addition, mevalonic acid's (MVA) involvement in biosynthesis of complex terpenoids, such as steroids, was demonstrated in 1983. Once produced, specifically within the disk cells, terpenes are stored within the trichomes of the plant. There are several types of terpenes in cannabis composed of varying numbers of isoprene units. They contribute to the signature aroma and insecticidal properties via their emission as volatile organic compounds. Different cannabis strains synthesize different terpenes through their biochemical pathways, and diversity of the terpenes is dependent upon the diversity of the TPS enzymes present in the cannabis plant's TPS gene pool. Though, causes of variations in the TPS enzymes are still unknown.

Monoterpenes myrcene and sesquiterpenes β-caryophyllene (binds to the human CB2 cannabinoids receptor) and α-humulene are the most common terpene compounds, and are present in most varieties of cannabis strains. The lack of exact standards makes it sometimes difficult for scientists to classify new terpenes. Terpene profiles are subject to change under different environmental conditions, which may lead to variation in TPS gene expression, ultimately leading to a variation in the synthesized terpenes. Terpenes have unique, distinct aromas, which is why each strain smells different. Cannabis plants, like many others, biochemically synthesize terpenes with intense aromas as a method of chemical defense in attempts to repel predators, and invite pollinators. Because terpenes and terpenoids are biologically active molecules, it is possible variations in terpenes may elicit different biological and psychoactive responses in humans. This is why people claim to have different psychological effects to different strains.

== Chemical biotic stress defense ==
One form of Cannabis defense is the up-regulation of cannabinoids and specialized terpenes in response to differing biotic stressors in the environment such as pests and predation. In a study from 2019, tobacco hornworm larvae were fed on an artificial diet of wheat germ containing a cannabis agent. The results showed that on average, significantly high dosages of CBD in the new diet may have decreased survival rates of the larvae. In addition, Maduca sexta larvae avoids eating plants containing high amounts of CBD, allowing for the indication that CBD may be a natural pest deterrent. However, research also has shown when the plant is subjected to mechanical wounds from certain insects, CBD levels were unchanged and even decreased. This observation may be due to difference in the species of insect and chemical secretions, thus providing a new hypothesis that CBD levels vary in response to certain species or even have no effect.

Phytocannabinoid and terpene content in the leaves and flowers of C. sativa rises when under attack by Tetranychus urticae, a common pest for the genus. When compared to a control of Cannabis sativa without any pest damage, research from 2022 demonstrated an overall increase of secondary metabolites in plants exposed to Tetranychus urtivae infestation and measured this metabolite rise using liquid and gas chromatograph mass spectrometers. The increase was found to be significant, and is attributed as a defense mechanism in the plant.

The induction and up-regulation of cannabinoids as defense genes in Cannabis can be induced by elicitors. In a study from 2019, salicylic acid (SA) was used with GABA as an elicitor to determine its effects on the expression of metabolites involved in THC and CBD biosynthesis. SA and GABA were demonstrated to effectively up-regulate the expression of THCAS, a cannabigerolic acid used to form THC, which resulted in higher levels of THC. These results support the mechanism in which cannabis elicitors such as salicylic acid and GABA triggers a signal cascade for increased expression of defense genes in response to stress.

One line of defense is the release of volatile organic compounds (VOCs) into the air to defend against herbivores by warning neighboring plants. The release of VOCs may begin with the jasmonic (JA) pathway which up-regulates defensive genes. Jasmonic acid, also called jasmonate, is a hormone linked to wound signaling in plants. Rapid wound signaling involves an influx of calcium after the arrival of an action potential. The increase of calcium triggers a regulatory protein, calmodulin, to turn on a protein kinase releasing JASMONATE-ASSOCIATED VQ-MOTIF GENE1 (JAV1) by combining it with phosphoric acid. From a study in 2020, in response to the necrotrophic pathogen gray mold, JA mediated markers were up-regulated in the leaves that were infected, from beginning of infection to the end. Through a series of signals, the plant detects the presence of fungal elicitors/pathogens, then through the JA pathway the expression of defense genes are increased.

== Chemical abiotic stress defense ==
=== Drought resistance ===
Drought poses negative impacts to growth and yield of hemp, therefore, hemp has evolved survival mechanisms for abiotic stress. Plant cells will discontinue normal growth rates when exposed to drought stress along with other physiological processes such as photosynthesis. Down regulating certain gene's expressions or transcription factors can assist in this response. For example, photosynthesis–antenna proteins and differentially expressed genes (DEGs) in the jasmonic acid pathway were demonstrated as being down-regulated during drought stress. In a 2018 research article by Gao, they attribute the down regulation to reduced photosynthesis in the plant. Up regulating genes can also occur, such as transcriptional factors from the NAC gene family, which were demonstrated to be over expressed in response to drought treatments, possibly contributing to tolerance. Numerous regulation genes involved in the biosynthesis of abscisic acid (ABA), a plant hormone linked to stress response, are over expressed during times of drought stress. Some of these genes are from the PP2C and SnPK gene families, linked to drought tolerance because of their intrinsic roles of ABA signaling. ABA signaling, controlled by changes in ABA metabolic pathways, assist in stomata closure and changes in the photosynthesis processes in hemp plants to combat water loss during drought stress.

Another stress hormone, auxin, may be important in drought tolerance by means of the gene GH3. A hemp GH3 homolog gene has been shown to increase drought resistance in rice by decreasing expression of Indole-3-Acetic Acid (IAA), which decreases photosynthesis and cell growth.

=== Salt stress ===
Ion balance is a key factor in plant development to produce yield. Too high salt concentration in soil lowers the water potential in root tissue which becomes toxic; stunting growth and inhibiting flowering by dehydrating the plant. Stomatal closure is also a response to high salinity, leading to lowered sugar production and transpiration rates. Plants respond to high salinity soils by accumulating sodium and chlorine, and reducing uptake of macronutrients and other ions. This accumulation results in inhibition of calcium signaling. In order to combat this type of stress, plants must have strategies and adaptations in place for survival, such as osmotic stress pathways. RNA sequencing and qRT-PCR analysis has made finding these gene expression pathways possible, such as the MAPK, allowing for the scrutiny of candidate genes responsible for greater tolerance to salinity. Candidate genes for this type of stress response have also been found in plant hormone signal transduction pathways. Different species of Cannabis carry unique variations of gene expression, with some having a greater ability to utilize salt tolerance by keeping potassium levels high enough as to deny sodium uptake.

Removing sodium from the cytoplasm by means of sodium or hydrogen anti-porters is another mechanism to resist desiccation from high salinity environments by using the salt overly sensitive (SOS) regulation pathway. The SOS pathway exchanges excess sodium for hydrogen, and it is set into action by calcium signal flux.

Modifying the cytoskeleton or utilizing an osmotic stress pathway are two other physiological defenses plants use to handle salinity. The ability to sense excess salinity is a valuable tool, where excess sodium can trigger an influx of calcium and reactive oxygen species (ROS). Without the ability to notice sodium, calcium wouldn't be triggered into a signaling cascade to flow into the cytosol. This flow notifies the system to block salt ions from entering into the roots by using any available defenses, such as modifying the cell wall. A plant without these sensing and signaling capabilities is considered salt-sensitive, known as a glycophyte.

=== Metal toxicity ===
Metal pollution in soil will induce high toxicity in hemp plants. Cadmium (Cd) toxicity has been proven to be long term and irreversible in plants. Cd specifically results in oxidative stress and increase in free radicals. Free radicals are found to cause oxidative stress, cell damage, and death. Hemp plants in Cd polluted soils were found to help detoxify the metal while the plants were still conserved. While growth in these hemp plants were slightly reduced when planted in Cd concentration soil, continued plant growth indicated hemp plants were able to detoxify some Cd. Specifically, transporter proteins would move Cd into the cell wall and differentially expressed genes (DEGs) would activate, bind, and defend against Cd stress. These DEGs were found to be involved in cell wall metabolism and were most active when in contact with Cd. The plant hormone ABA plays an important role in activating signal transduction cascades and cell cycling and growth. An increase of ABC transporters in hemp plants contributes to increases in calcium concentration, indicating that calcium-binding proteins can control Cd concentration and absorption.
