= Cannabichromene =

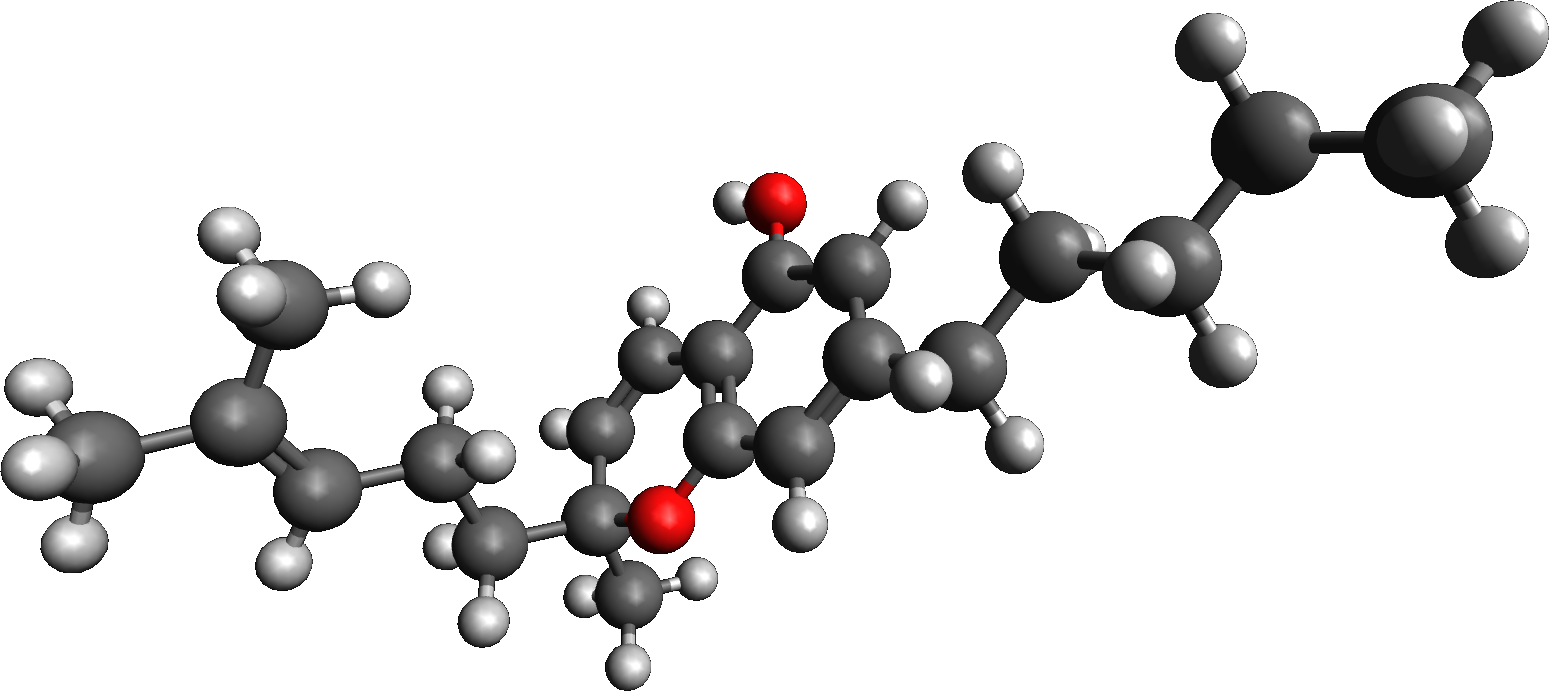

Names
- IUPAC name 2-Methyl-2-(4-methylpent-3-enyl)-7-pentyl-5-chromenol

Identifiers
CAS Number	20675-51-8
3D model (JSmol)	Interactive image
ChEMBL	ChEMBL422704
ChemSpider	28064
ECHA InfoCard	100.236.929
PubChem CID	30219
UNII	K4497H250W
CompTox Dashboard (EPA)	DTXSID80942873
- InChI: InChI=1S/C21H30O2/c1-5-6-7-10-17-14-19(22)18-11-13-21(4,23-20(18)15-17)12-8-9-16(2)3/h9,11,13-15,22H,5-8,10,12H2,1-4H3 Key: UVOLYTDXHDXWJU-UHFFFAOYSA-N; InChI=1/C21H30O2/c1-5-6-7-10-17-14-19(22)18-11-13-21(4,23-20(18)15-17)12-8-9-16(2)3/h9,11,13-15,22H,5-8,10,12H2,1-4H3 Key: UVOLYTDXHDXWJU-UHFFFAOYAG
- SMILES: CCCCCC1=CC2=C(C=CC(O2)(C)CCC=C(C)C)C(=C1)O

Properties
Chemical formula	C_{21}H_{30}O_{2}
Molar mass	314.469 g·mol^{−1}
- Except where otherwise noted, data are given for materials in their standard state (at 25 °C [77 °F], 100 kPa). verify (what is ?) Infobox references

Cannabichromene (CBC), also called cannabichrome, cannanbichromene, pentylcannabichromene or cannabinochromene, is a phytocannabinoid, one of the hundreds of cannabinoids found in the Cannabis plant. It bears structural similarity to the other natural cannabinoids, including tetrahydrocannabinol (THC), tetrahydrocannabivarin (THCV), cannabidiol (CBD), and cannabinol (CBN), among others. It is not scheduled by the Convention on Psychotropic Substances.

== Biosynthesis ==
Within the Cannabis plant, CBC occurs mainly as cannabichromenic acid (CBCA, 2-COOH-CBC, CBC-COOH). Geranyl pyrophosphate and olivetolic acid combine to produce cannabigerolic acid (CBGA; the sole intermediate for all other phytocannabinoids), which is cyclized by the enzyme CBCA synthase to form CBCA. Over time, or when heated above 93 °C, CBCA is decarboxylated, producing CBC. See also the biosynthetic scheme image below.

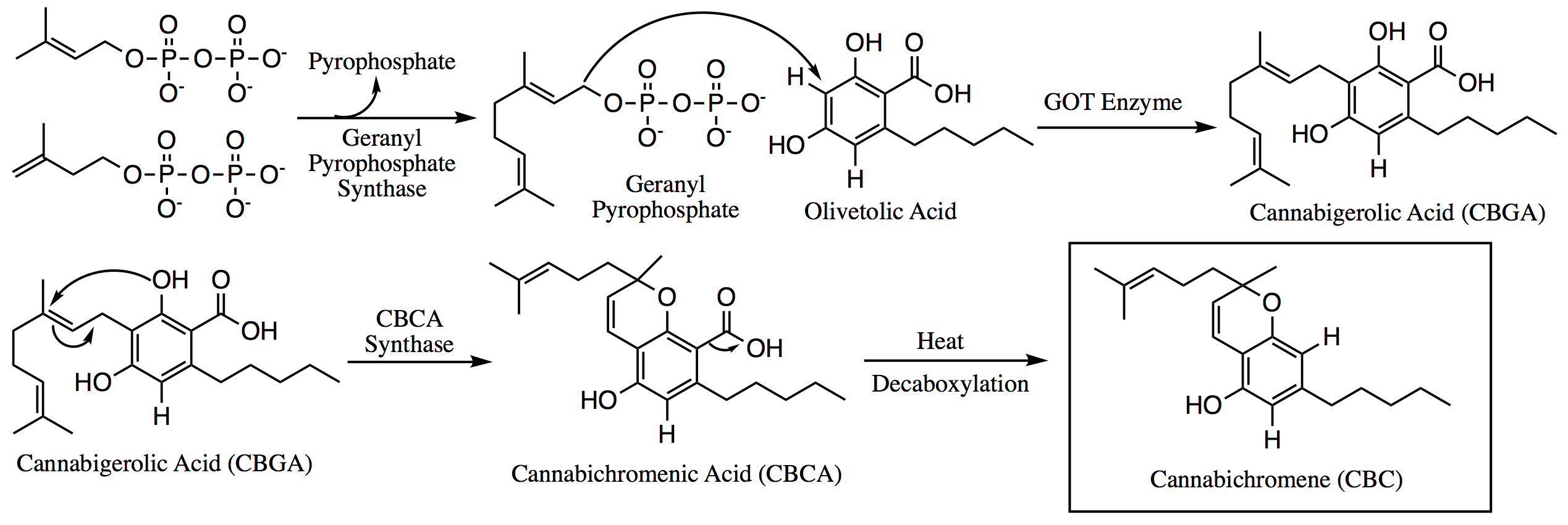
CBC biosynthetic scheme

== Pharmacology ==
Cannabichromene has been hypothesized to affect THC psychoactivity, though in vivo effects have not been demonstrated. CBC acts on the TRPV1 and TRPA1 receptors, interfering with their ability to break down endocannabinoids (chemicals such as anandamide and 2-AG that the body creates naturally). CBC has shown antitumor effects in breast cancer xenoplants in mice. It also has anticonvulsant activity in a mouse model.

In vitro, CBC binds weakly to CB1 and CB2 with binding affinities of 713 nM and 256 nM, respectively, which are significantly lower than that for THC with 35 nM at CB1. acting as an agonist for cAMP stimulation and an antagonist at beta-arrestin. Additionally, CBC is an agonist of TRPA1, and less potently TRPV3 and TRPV4. CBC has two stereoisomers.
