= Hash oil =

Oleoresin obtained by the extraction of hashish

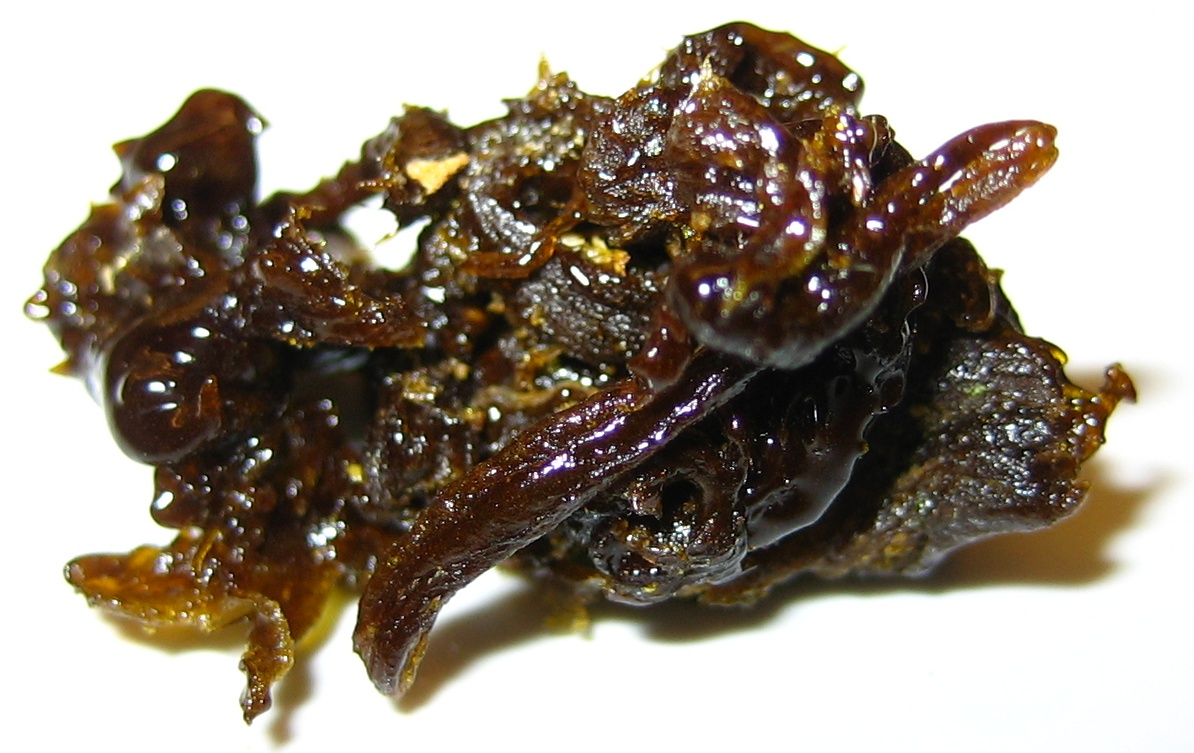
- One form of hash oil
- Source plant(s): Cannabis sativa, Cannabis indica, Cannabis ruderalis (rarely)
- Part(s) of plant: all parts (excluding roots and seeds)
- Geographic origin: United States; Afghanistan
- Active ingredients: Phytocannabinoids
- Legal status: AU: S9 (Prohibited substance); CA: Unscheduled; DE: Anlage I (Authorized scientific use only); UK: Class B; US: Schedule I; UN: Narcotic Schedule I

Hash oil or cannabis oil is an oleoresin obtained by the extraction of cannabis or hashish. It is a cannabis concentrate containing many of its natural products – in particular, terpenes, tetrahydrocannabinol (THC), cannabidiol (CBD), and other phytocannabinoids. Hash oil is usually consumed by smoking, vaporizing or eating. Preparations of hash oil may be solid or semi-liquid colloids depending on both production method and temperature and are usually identified by their appearance or characteristics. Color most commonly ranges from transparent golden or light brown, to tan or black. There are various extraction methods, most involving a somewhat nonpolar solvent, such as butane or ethanol.

Hash oil is an extracted cannabis product that may use any part of the plant, with minimal or no residual solvent. It is generally thought to be indistinct from traditional hashish, at-least according to the 1961 UN Single Convention on Narcotic Drugs that defines these products as "the separated resin, whether crude or purified, obtained from the cannabis plant".

Hash oil may be sold in cartridges to be used with pen vaporizers or infused into food products (cannabis edibles). Cannabis retailers in California have reported about 40% of their sales are from smokeable cannabis oils.

== Composition ==
The tetrahydrocannabinol (THC) varies depending on preparation techniques and the variety of plant used. Dealers sometimes cut hash oils with other oils. The form of the extract varies depending on the extraction process used; it may be liquid, a clear amber solid (called "shatter"), a sticky semisolid substance (called "wax"), or a brittle honeycombed solid (called "honeycomb wax").

Hash oil seized in the 1970s had a THC content ranging from 10% to 30%. The highest THC concentrations measured were 52.9% in hashish and 47.0% in hash oil. Hash oils in use in the 2010s had THC concentrations as high as 90% and other products achieving higher concentrations.

Following an outbreak of vaping-related pulmonary illnesses and deaths in 2019, NBC News conducted tests on different black market THC vape cartridges and found cartridges containing up to 30% Vitamin E acetate, and trace amounts of fungicides and pesticides that may be harmful.

The following compounds were found in naphtha extracts of Bedrocan Dutch medical cannabis:

- Cannabinoids: THC (~ 30%) and THCA (~ 60%).
- Monoterpenes (~ 5%): β-pinene, myrcene, β-phellandrene, cis-ocimene, terpinolene, and terpineol.
- Sesquiterpenes (~ 5%): β-caryophyllene, humulene, δ-guaiene, γ-cadinene, eudesma-3,7(11)-diene, and elemene.

== History ==
=== Discovery and development ===
The hash oils made in the 19th century were made from hand collected hashish called charas and kief. The term hash oil was hashish that had been dissolved or infused into a vegetable oil for use in preparing foods for oral administration. Efforts to isolate the active ingredient in cannabis were well documented in the 19th century, and cannabis extracts and tinctures of cannabis were included in the British Pharmacopoeia and the United States Pharmacopoeia. These solvent extracts were termed cannabin (1845), cannabindon, cannabinine, crude cannabinol and cannabinol.

=== Modern usage ===
So-called "butane honey oil" was available briefly in the 1970s. This product was made in Kabul, Afghanistan, and smuggled into the United States by The Brotherhood of Eternal Love. Production is thought to have ceased when the manufacturing facility was destroyed in an explosion.

Traditional ice water-separated hashish production utilizes water and filter bags to separate plant material from resin, though this method still leaves much residual plant matter and is therefore poorly suited for full vaporization. Gold described the use of grain alcohol and activated charcoal in honey oil production by 1989, and Michael Starks further detailed procedures and various solvents by 1990.

Large cannabis vaporizers gained popularity in the twentieth century for their ability to vaporize the cannabinoids in cannabis and extracts without burning plant material, using temperature-controlled vaporization. Colorado and Washington began licensing hash oil extraction operations in 2014. Small portable vape pens saw a dramatic increase in popularity in 2017.

== Use ==
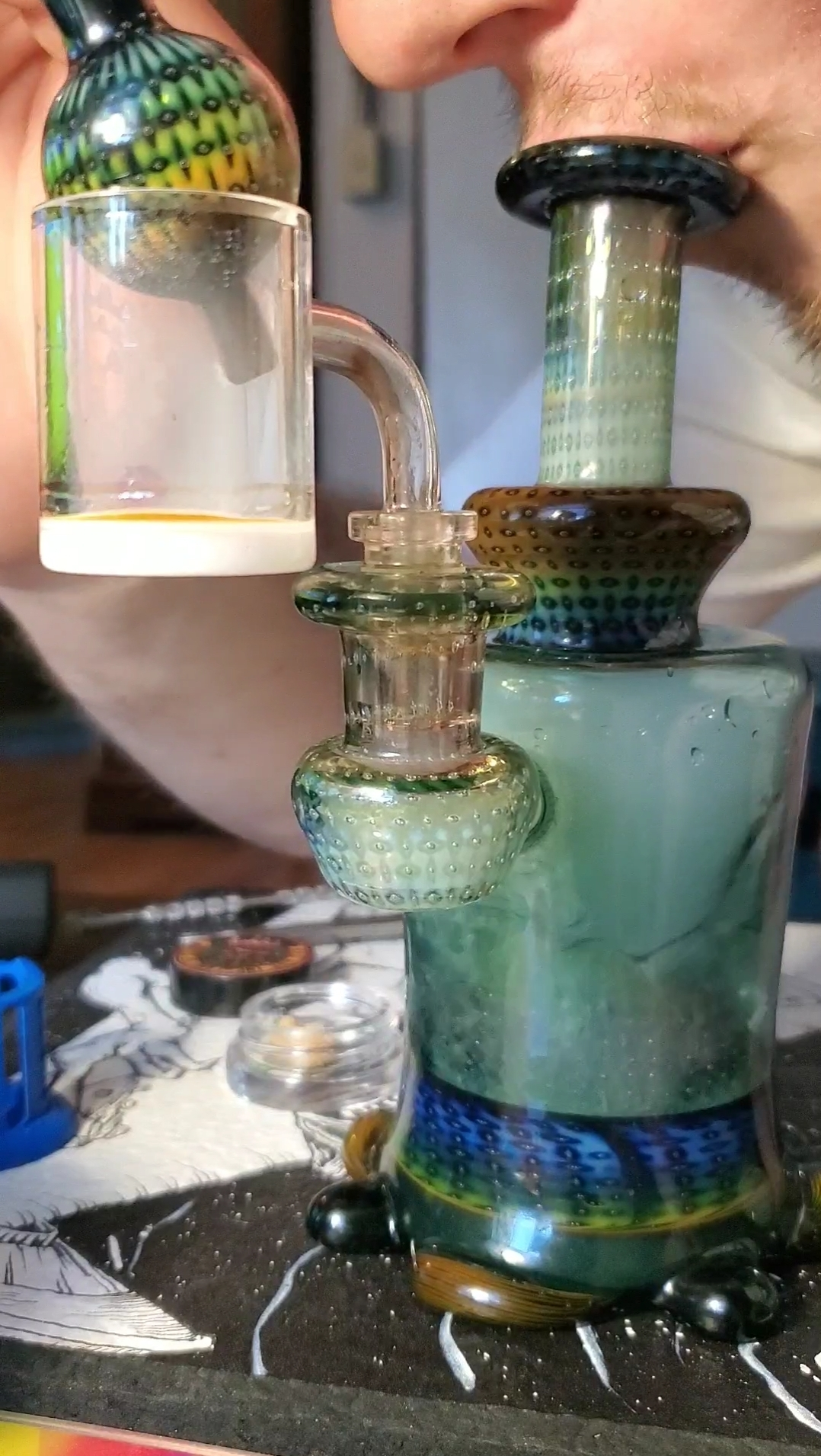
Dabbing hash oil. The clear quartz bucket has been heated using a torch and the hash rosin placed within (seen melted as the small amber puddle). The glass cap (upper left of frame) is placed on top and creates a low pressure zone in the bucket, allowing the material to vaporize at a lower temperature than the ambient atmosphere. The vapor is then directed through a water pipe to further cool before inhalation.

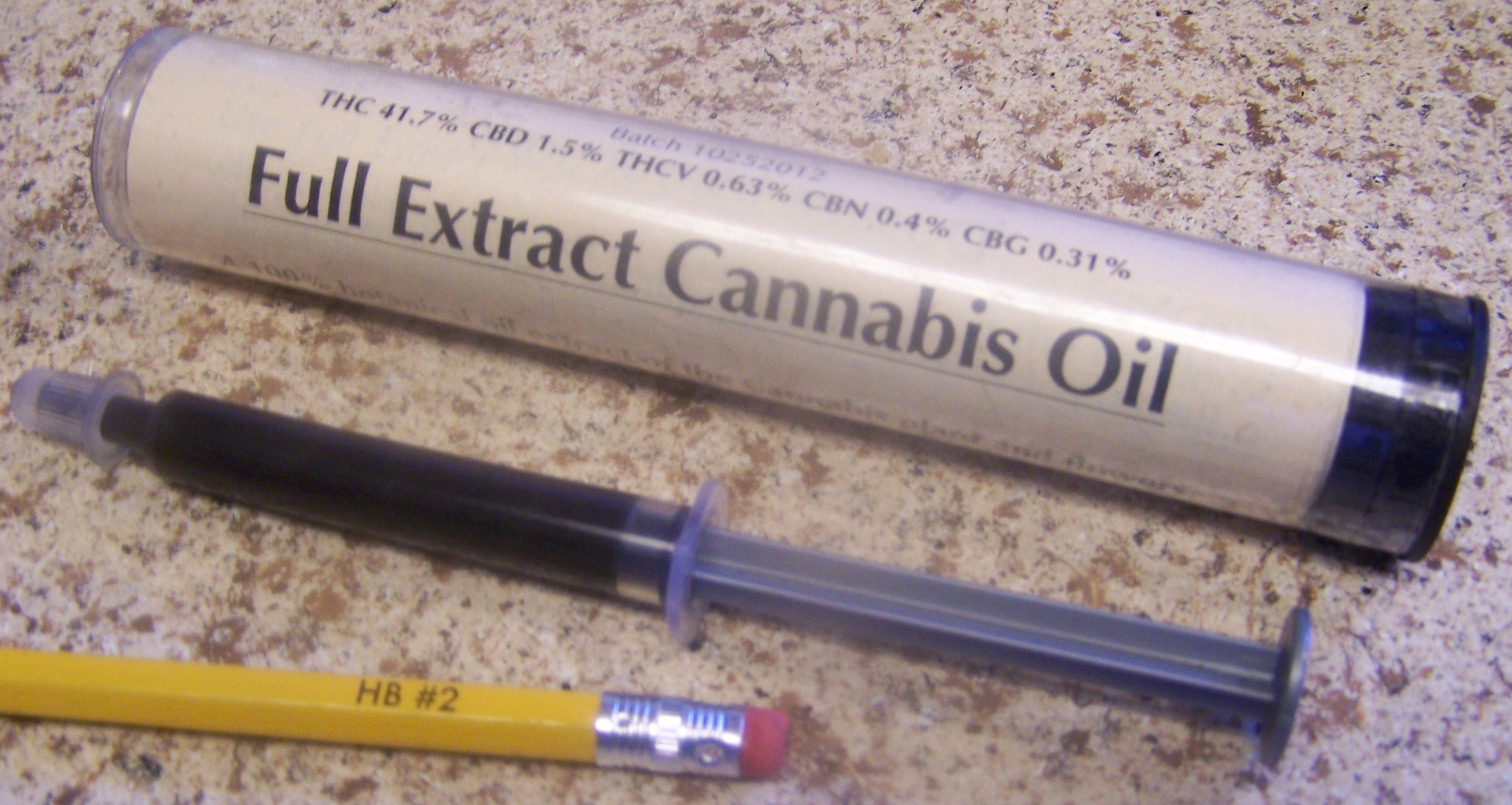
Full extract oil in an oral syringe

Hash oil is consumed usually by ingestion, smoking or vaporization.

=== Dabbing ===
Smoking or vaporizing hash oil is known colloquially as "dabbing", from the English verb to daub (Dutch dabben, French dauber), "to smear with something adhesive". Devices used for this process include water pipes ("dab rigs"), vaporizers, and vape pens. Oil rigs include a glass water pipe and a quartz bucket which is often covered with a glass bubble or directional cap to direct the airflow and disperse the oil amongst the hot areas of the quartz "nail" (A nail is also referred to as a banger). The pipe is often heated with a butane blowtorch rather than a cigarette lighter.

The oil can also be sold in prefilled atomizer cartridges. The cartridge is used by connecting it to a battery and inhaling the vaporized oil from the cartridge's mouthpiece.

== Production ==
=== Solvent extracts ===
Hash oil is produced by solvent extraction (maceration, infusion or percolation) of marijuana or hashish.

Fresh, undried plant material is less suited for hash oil production, because much THC and CBD will be present in their carboxylic acid forms (THCA and CBDA), which may not be highly soluble in some solvents.

A wide variety of solvents can be used for extraction, such as chloroform, dichloromethane, petroleum ether, naphtha, benzene, butane, methanol, ethanol, isopropanol, and olive oil.

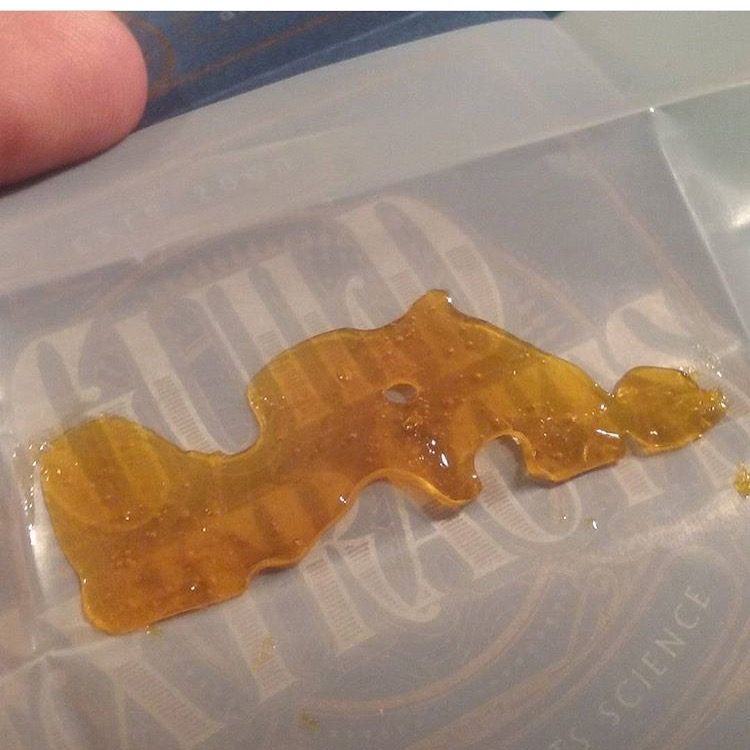
Hash oil produced using a specialized hydrocarbon solvent process is referred to as shatter, due to the very thick and glass-like appearance of the final product.

The majority of ready to consume extract products are produced via "Closed Loop Systems". These systems typically entail: a vessel that holds the solvent, material columns to hold the plant material, a flow meter to measure the volume of solvent entering the plant material, a recovery vessel(where heat is applied via an external jacket) to convert the liquid solvent into a vapor and separate it from the THC, CBD, or other cannabinoids/byproducts, and some form of a heat exchanger to then convert the hydrocarbon vapors back into a liquid form prior to returning to the original vessel. Such a process can be carried out using a Soxhlet extractor.

Ten grams of marijuana yields one to two grams of hash oil. The oil may retain considerable residual solvent: oil extracted with longer-chain volatile hydrocarbons (such as naphtha) is less viscous (thinner) than oil extracted with short-chain hydrocarbons (such as butane).

Colored impurities from the oil can be removed with activated charcoal. When decolorizing fatty oils, oil retention can be up to 50 wt % on bleaching earths and nearly 100 wt % on activated charcoal. The many different textures/types of hydrocarbon extracts include:

- shatter (solid, breaks easily, glass like oil)
- pull and snap (solid, bendable, but still breakable, taffy-like oil)
- diamonds/live resin (rock hard THCA isolated diamonds drenched in terpene sauce)
- crumble (solid oil that will break into small crumbs)
- budder/wax (soft, pliable, peanut butter-like consistency)

=== Solventless extracts: Hash rosin ===
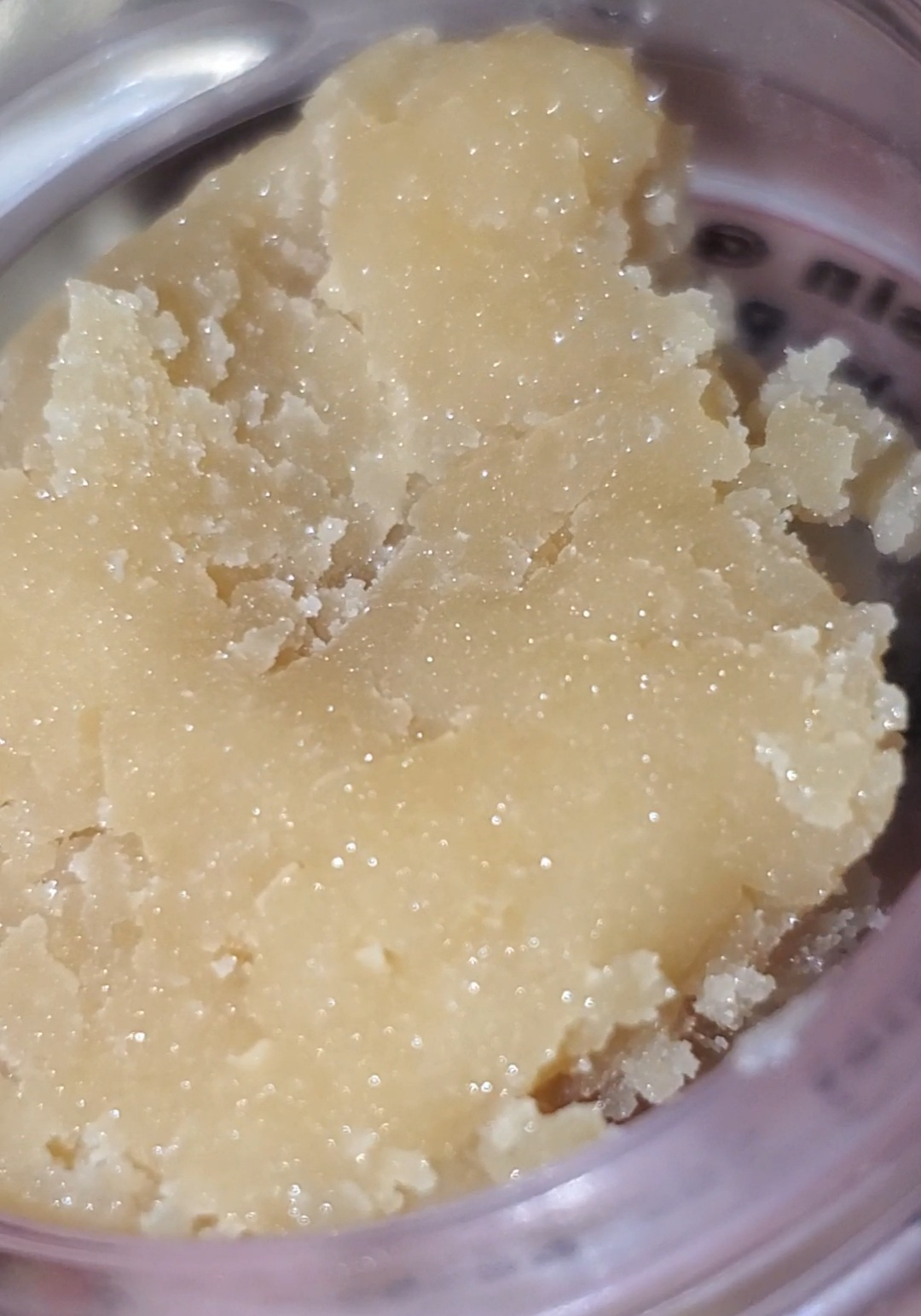
Full spectrum hash rosin that has been placed in a jar for sale

Hash rosin has recently become a highly prized product in the cannabis market. For dabbing, it is considered to be the cleanest form of concentrating cannabis, as it requires only ice, water (instead of organic solvents like butane), heat, pressure, and collection tools. Cannabis flower material is washed with ice water, and strained using filters in sequential micron size to isolate intact trichomes and their heads into ice water hash. The microns that are held in highest regards are the 73μ and 90μ, as this is where the resin heads reside. These are sometimes isolated and sold as one of the highest quality, most expensive cannabis products in the market today, known as "full melt" because it will dab fine without having to be pressed. "Full spectrum" hash rosin will normally come from 45μ-159μ, as smaller and larger particles are likely to be too unrefined or broken stalks of the trichomes.

This hash is then pressed at the appropriate temperature and pressure to squeeze the oils out of the hash, and is collected with metal tools and parchment paper. Just like hydrocarbon extraction, the quality of the final product depends greatly on the quality of the starting material. This is emphasized even more so with hash rosin due to its lower yield percentages compared to solvent-derived concentrates (.3-8% rosin vs 10-20% hydrocarbon). Hash rosin producers often touch on how growing cannabis for hash production is different than growing for flower production, as some strains will be deceptive with their looks regarding yields.

== Legality ==
In Canada, hash oil, a chemically concentrated extract with up to 90% THC potency, is legal: regulations creating three new classes of cannabis, edible cannabis, cannabis extracts, and cannabis topicals, came into force on October 17, 2019, and cannabis edible products and concentrates have been legal for sale since that date; sales of the new product classes were permitted from as early as December 16, 2019.

In the United States, hash oil remains federally illegal as a marijuana extract listed in Schedule I of the Controlled Substances Act. An order issued on April 23, 2026, which faces legal challenges in the D.C. Circuit Court of Appeals, moved FDA-approved cannabis products and state-licensed medical marijuana to Schedule III. A broader rescheduling of marijuana to Schedule III, accelerated by a December 2025 executive order, is under consideration following an expedited DEA hearing that began on June 29, 2026.

In Germany, the KCanG (Cannabis law), which has been in force since April 1, 2024, allows adults to possess, for personal use, up to 25 grams of cannabis in public and up to 50 grams at their home. The law defines cannabis to include the resin (Harz) of the plant. It prohibits the extraction of cannabinoids from the plant, with limited exceptions (CBD and testing by cultivation associations); the extraction itself is separately criminalized. According to the legislative justification, the ban is intended to prevent the production of synthetic cannabinoids, or of oils or extracts with a high THC content, such as hash oil, while the production of hashish by sifting, rubbing, or similar methods remains permitted. The law does not specify whether a solvent extract such as hash oil is covered by the possession limits. The term extraction is not defined in the law; in the context of hash oil, it typically refers to the use of a solvent such as butane. As this is not used in the production of rosin, it is uncertain whether rosin is a legal cannabis resin under the KCanG or an illegal extract.

== Ingredient in vape liquids ==
=== Adulterated products ===
==== Vitamin E acetate ====
On 5 September 2019, the United States Food and Drug Administration (US FDA) announced that 10 out of 18, or 56% of the samples of vape liquids sent in by states, linked to recent vaping related lung disease outbreak in the United States, tested positive for vitamin E acetate which had been used as a thickening agent by illicit THC vape cartridge manufacturers. On 8 November 2019, the Centers for Disease Control and Prevention (CDC) identified vitamin E acetate as a very strong culprit of concern in the vaping-related illnesses, but has not ruled out other chemicals or toxicants as possible causes. The CDC's findings were based on fluid samples from the lungs of 29 patients with vaping-associated pulmonary injury, which provided direct evidence of vitamin E acetate at the primary site of injury in all the 29 lung fluid samples tested. Research suggests when vitamin E acetate is inhaled, it may interfere with normal lung functioning. "Vitamin E oil might be in 60-70% of street carts, insiders say."

==== Synthetic cannabinoids ====
Counterfeit THC oil has been detected to contain synthetic cannabinoids. Several school children in Greater Manchester collapsed after vaping Spice mis-sold as 'natural cannabis'.

== Safety ==
=== Use ===
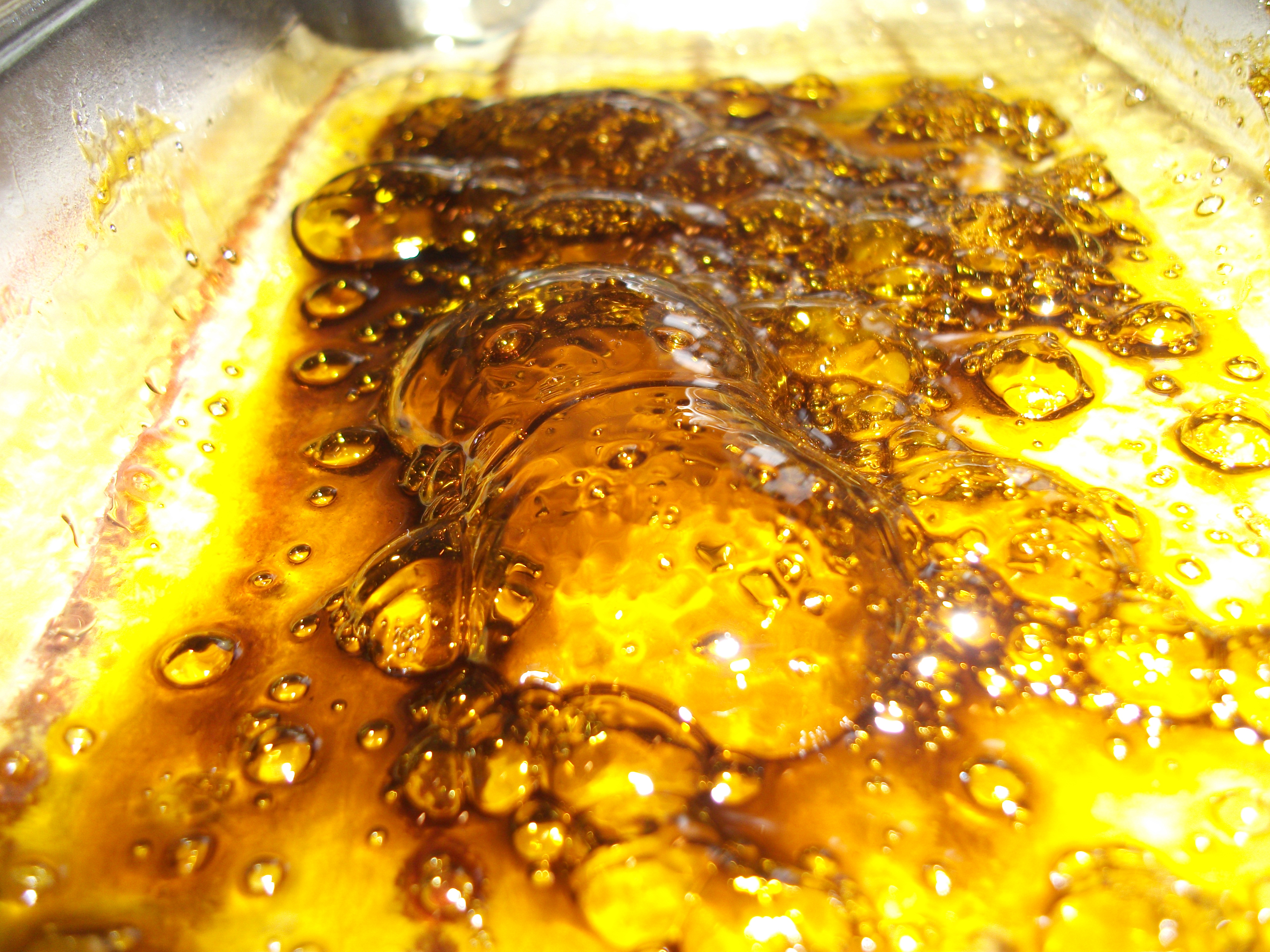
Hash oil being purged of excess butane which forms bubbles as the solvent evaporates

As of 2015 the health effects of using hash oil were poorly documented. Cannabis extracts have less plant matter and create less harmful smoke. However, trace amounts of impurities are not generally regarded as safe (GRAS). In 2019 following an outbreak of illnesses additives added to vape pen mixtures were found to be causing breathing problems, lung damage, and deaths.

=== Production ===
Most of the solvents employed vaporize quickly and are flammable, making the extraction process dangerous. Several explosion and fire incidents related to hash oil manufacturing attempts in homes have been reported.

The solvents used to extract THC are rather flammable and have resulted in explosions, fires, severe injuries, and deaths.

=== Handling ===
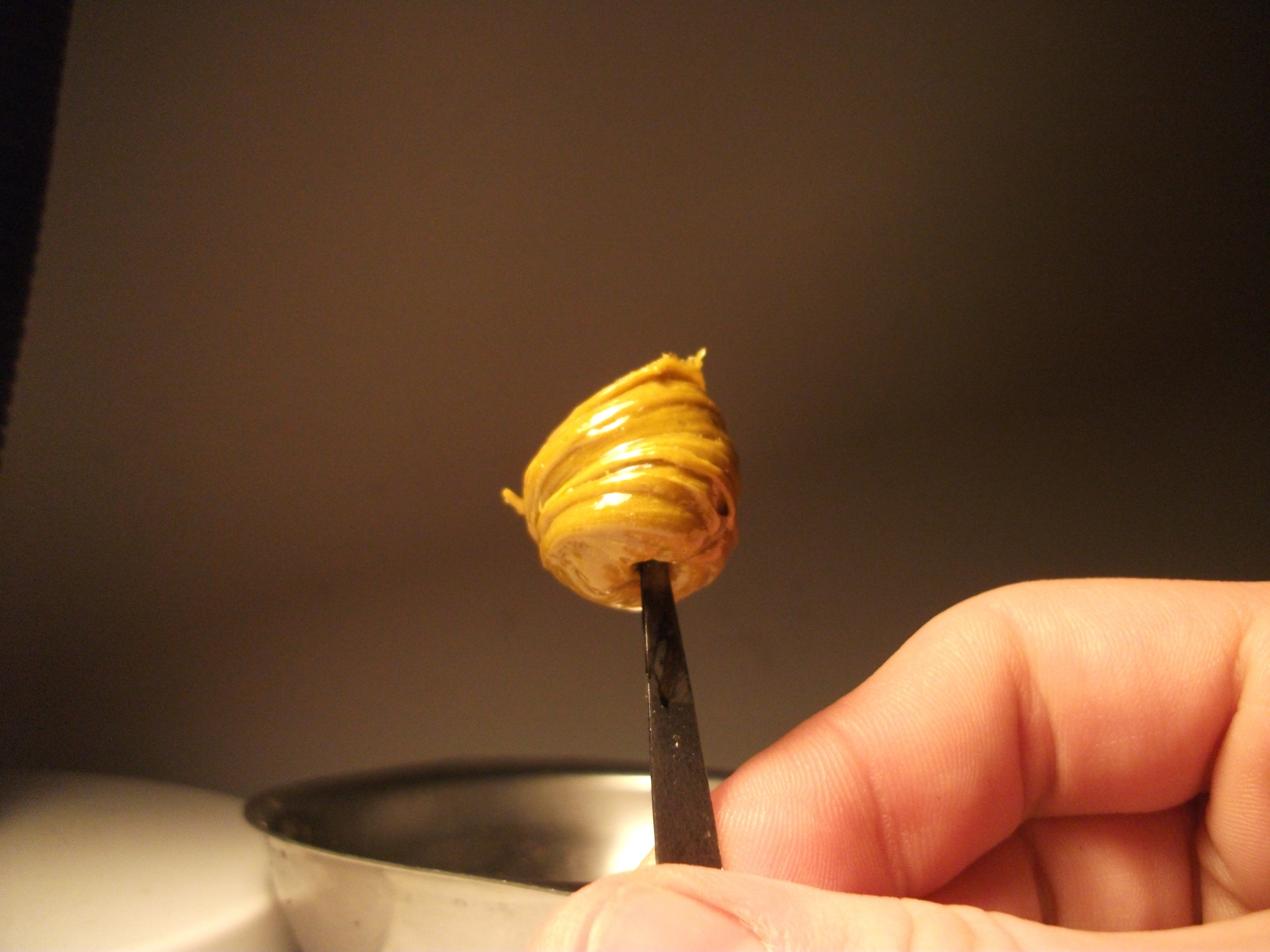
Butane honey oil

Hash oil can contain up to 80% THC, though up to 99% is possible with other methods of extraction. While health issues of the lungs may be exacerbated by use of hash oil, it is not known to cause side effects not already found in other preparations of cannabis.

=== Storage ===
When exposed to air, warmth and light (especially without antioxidants), the oil loses its taste and psychoactivity due to aging. Cannabinoid carboxylic acids (THCA, CBDA, and maybe others) have an antibiotic effect on gram-positive bacteria such as MRSA, but gram-negative bacteria such as Escherichia coli are unaffected.

== See also ==
- Cannabis concentrate
- Fragrance extraction
- Liquid smoke
- Live resin
- Oleoresin capsicum
- Rosin
- Tall oil
- Gas explosions
- Tincture of cannabis
