= Tetrahydrocannabinolic acid =

THC precursor

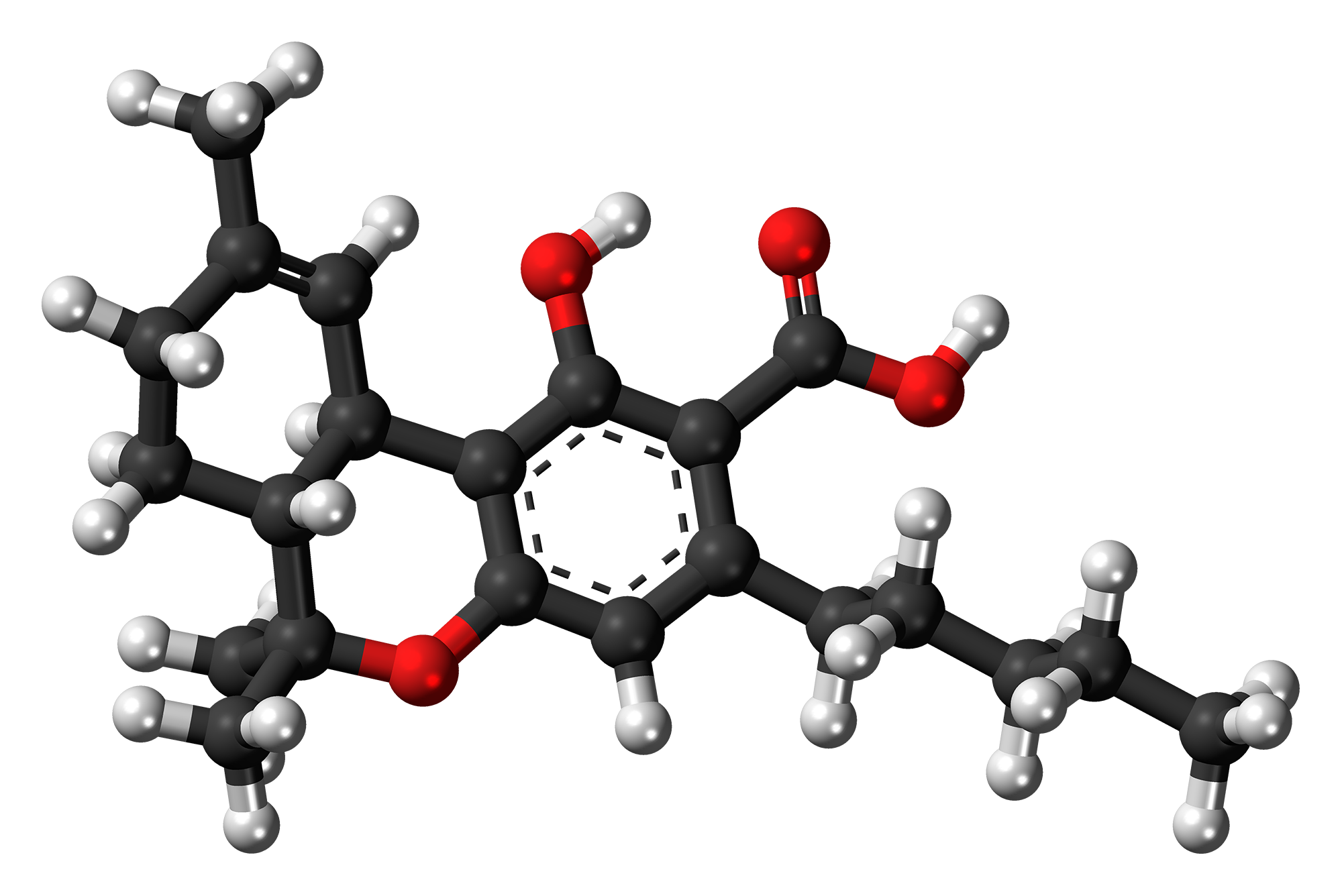

Clinical data
- Other names: 2-Carboxy-THC; THCA, 2-COOH-THC
- Routes of administration: Oral, Smoking, Vaporized (Note: When THCA is heated, it converts to THC, and this happens faster at higher temperatures.)
- ATC code: none

Legal status
- Legal status: SE: Förteckning I

Identifiers
- IUPAC name: (6aR,10aR)-1-Hydroxy-6,6,9-trimethyl-3-pentyl-6a,7,8,10a-tetrahydro-6H-benzo[c]chromene-2-carboxylic acid
- CAS Number: 23978-85-0
- PubChem CID: 98523
- ChemSpider: 88974
- UNII: EJ6CZV0K5Y
- CompTox Dashboard (EPA): DTXSID30178701
- ECHA InfoCard: 100.216.805

Chemical and physical data
- Formula: C_{22}H_{30}O_{4}
- Molar mass: 358.478 g·mol^{−1}
- 3D model (JSmol): Interactive image
- SMILES: CCCCCC1=CC2=C([C@@H]3C=C(CC[C@H]3C(O2)(C)C)C)C(=C1C(=O)O)O

Tetrahydrocannabinolic acid (THCA, 2-COOH-THC; conjugate base tetrahydrocannabinolate) is a precursor of tetrahydrocannabinol (THC), an active component of cannabis.

THCA is found in variable quantities in fresh, undried cannabis, but is progressively decarboxylated to THC with drying, and especially under intense heating such as when cannabis is smoked or cooked into cannabis edibles.

== Uses ==
THCA is rarely directly used, but its presence is commonly analyzed when cannabis or hemp-based products are screened for THC; some countries require that it be measured in such screens.

THCA in its isolated form is available for purchase in select medical and recreational cannabis dispensaries in the form of a white crystalline powder. It can be smoked or vaporized in typical smoking devices, such as a bong or dab rig (device used for vaporizing hash oil). These methods convert the THCA to THC and so are used for their psychoactive effects. THCA is also sometimes encapsulated and taken as a supplement for a variety of illnesses, although there are currently no established medical applications.

== Pharmacological effects ==
Conversion of THCA to THC in vivo appears to be very limited, giving it only very slight efficacy as a prodrug for THC. In receptor binding assays it is promiscuous; there are papers showing it being an inhibitor of PC-PLC, COX-1, COX-2, TRPM8, TRPV1, FAAH, NAAA, MGL, and DGLα, and an inhibitor of anandamide transport, as well as an agonist of TRPA1 and TRPV2. Many THCA reagents used in biochemistry experiments are contaminated with THC due to THCA's instability.

A study found THCA and unheated Cannabis sativa extracts exert immuno-modulating effect, not mediated by the cannabinoid CB1 and CB2 receptor coupled pathways like THC. THCA was able to inhibit the tumor necrosis factor alpha (TNF_{α}) levels in U937 macrophages and peripheral blood macrophages, an inhibition that persisted over a longer period of time, whereas after prolonged exposure time THC and heated extract tend to induce the TNF_{α} level. THCA and THC show distinct effects on phosphatidylcholine specific phospholipase C (PC-PLC) activity, as THCA and unheated extracts inhibit the PC-PLC activity in a dose-dependent manner, but THC only induced PC-PLC activity at high concentrations, suggest THCA and THC exert their immuno-modulating effects via different metabolic pathways.

The anti-inflammatory activity of C. sativa extracts was studied on three lines of epithelial cells and on colon tissue in a model of inflammatory bowel diseases (IBDs), where C. sativa flowers were extracted with ethanol, found the anti-inflammatory activity of Cannabis extracts derives from THCA present in fraction 7 (F7) of the extract. However, all fractions of C. sativa at a certain combination of concentrations show a significant increased cytotoxic activity and suppress COX-2 and MMP9 gene expression in both cell culture and colon tissue, suggest the anti-inflammatory activity of Cannabis extracts on colon epithelial cells derives from a fraction of the extract that contains THCA, and is mediated, at least partially, via GPR55 receptor. The cytotoxic activity of the C. sativa extract was increased by combining all fractions at a certain combination of concentrations and was partially affected by CB2 receptor antagonist that increased cell proliferation. It is suggested that in a nonpsychoactive treatment for IBD, THCA should be used rather than CBD.

THCA binds to and activates PPARγ with higher potency than its decarboxylated products.

THCA shows a similar metabolism to THC in humans, producing 11-OH-THCA and 11-nor-9-carboxy-THCA. Although the decarboxylation of THCA to THC was assumed to be complete, which means that no THCA should be detectable in urine and blood serum of cannabis consumers, it is found in the urine and blood serum samples collected from police controls of drivers, suspected for driving under the influence of drugs (DUID). THCA was detected in the urine and blood serum samples of several cannabis consumers in concentrations of up to 10.8 ng/mL in urine and 14.8 ng/mL in serum. The concentration of THCA was below the THC concentration in most serum samples, resulting in molar ratios of THCA/THC of approximately 5.0–18.6%. Where a short elapsed time between the last intake and blood sampling was assumed, the molar ratio was 18.6% in the serum.

== Chemistry ==
It has two isomers, THCA-A, in which the carboxylic acid group is in the 1 position, between the hydroxy group and the carbon chain, and THCA-B, in which the carboxylic acid group is in the 3 position, following the carbon chain. The crystal structures of both THCA-A (colourless prisms, orthorhombic P2_{1}2_{1}2_{1}) and THCA-B (also colourless prisms, orthorhombic P2_{1}2_{1}2_{1}) have been reported.

In the past THCA was thought to be formed in plants by cyclization of cannabidiolic acid but due to studies in the late 1990s it became apparent that its precursor is cannabigerolic acid, which goes through oxidocyclization through the actions of the enzyme THCA-synthase.

It is unstable, and slowly decarboxylates into THC during storage, and the THC itself slowly degrades to CBN, which has potential immunosuppressive and anti-inflammatory activities. When heated or burned, as when cannabis is smoked or included in baked goods, the decarboxylation is rapid but not complete; THCA is detectable in people who smoke or otherwise consume cannabis.

== Legal status ==
THCA is not scheduled by the United Nations' Convention on Psychotropic Substances.

=== United States ===
Hemp-derived THCA is prevalent and explicitly unscheduled under the Controlled Substances Act's definition that legalizes all cannabis with less than 0.3% delta-9 tetrahydrocannabinol concentration. THCA is not scheduled at the federal level in the United States, but it is possible that THCA could legally be considered an analog of THC and sales or possession could potentially be prosecuted under the Federal Analogue Act. In practice, because THCA spontaneously decarboxylates to form THC, no real sample of purified THCA will be completely free of THC. Thus, any laboratory analysis of THCA using any technique involving significant heat will generate THC in the handling and analytical process. Further, both the Farm Bill and the USDA specify that analytical testing of samples for total THC must use "post-decarboxylation or other similarly reliable methods".

Despite the marketing of THCa flower and products as being lawful hemp under the 2018 farm bill, many arrests and raids have happened as a result of the retail sale of these products in locales with strict anti-marijuana laws. The Colorado Attorney General's Office has sued at least two businesses for the sale of THCa products with more than .3% delta-9 THC, as well as mislabeling, and toxic compounds found in some products by one company. One notable arrest in Charlotte, NC, resulted in a woman being beaten and arrested for smoking a pre-roll sold as lawful THCa hemp at a local retailer. Charges for marijuana possession were later dropped and the officer involved was suspended for excessive force. Several of these raids have resulted in lawsuits against law enforcement agencies and their agents, many of which are currently pending. Tennessee is unique in that THCa is explicitly listed as an allowed hemp-derived cannabinoid, and defense attorneys have successfully had prosecutions overturned due to post-decarboxylation testing of post-harvest plant material. There is not a clear current consensus, as far as case law goes, on a state or national level.

==== Arkansas ====
As of June 25, 2025, the U.S. 8th Circuit Court of Appeals overturned a lower court's injunction, allowing Arkansas to enforce its ban on hemp-derived THC products, including THCA (listed in some interpretations). This ruling means that Act 629, which classifies Delta-8, Delta-9 (above 0.3%), and Delta-10 THC ("Psychoactive hemp-derived cannabinoids" as stated in Act 629, although THCa is not active on its own and is only transformed into Delta-9-THC when heated) as Schedule VI controlled substances in the state, is now enforceable. Previously, sales of these products had been temporarily permitted due to the injunction.

=== Sweden ===
THCA was prohibited in Sweden on 14 July, 2026. The substance has been mentioned in 11 calls to the Swedish Poison Information Centre between 2024 and 2026. Intake from vaporizers, powder and baked goods was reported and vapes were most common in the calls. According to the Public Health Agency's submission to the government, abuse occurs and may increase in Sweden.

== See also ==
- Cannabinoids
- Cannabidiol (CBD)
