= Tetrahydrocannabinolic acid synthase =

Enzyme

Tetrahydrocannibinolic acid synthase
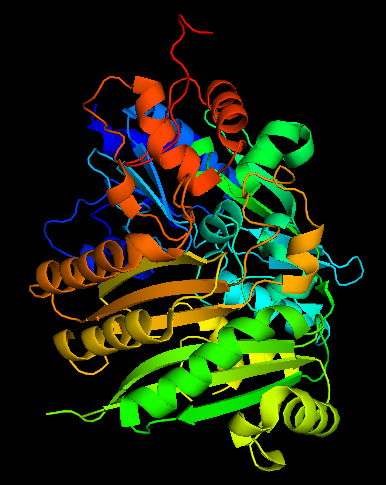
- 3VTE

Identifiers
- EC no.: 1.21.3.7

Databases
- IntEnz: IntEnz view
- BRENDA: BRENDA entry
- ExPASy: NiceZyme view
- KEGG: KEGG entry
- MetaCyc: metabolic pathway
- PRIAM: profile
- PDB structures: RCSB PDB PDBe PDBsum
Search
- PMC: articles
- PubMed: articles
- NCBI: proteins

Tetrahydrocannabinolic acid (THCA) synthase (full name Δ^{1}-tetrahydrocannabinolic acid synthase) is an enzyme responsible for catalyzing the formation of THCA from cannabigerolic acid (CBGA). THCA is the direct precursor of tetrahydrocannabinol (THC), the principal psychoactive component of cannabis, which is produced from various strains of Cannabis sativa. Therefore, THCA synthase is considered to be a key enzyme controlling cannabis psychoactivity. Polymorphisms of THCA synthase result in varying levels of THC in Cannabis plants, resulting in "drug-type" and "fiber-type" C. sativa varieties.

== Structure ==
THCA synthase is a 60 kDa (~500 amino acids) monomeric enzyme with the isoelectric point at 6.4. Post-translational N-linked glycosylation increases the total mass to approximately 74 kDa. The tertiary structure is divided into two domains (domains I and II), with a flavin adenine dinucleotide (FAD) positioned between the two domains. Domain I comprises eight alpha helices and eight beta sheet and is covalently bound to FAD. Domain II comprises five alpha helices surrounded by eight beta sheets. Enzymes that share similar amino acid sequences include the flavoproteins berberine bridge enzyme (BBE), glucooligosaccharide oxidase (GOOX), and aclacinomycin oxidoreductase (AknOx).

The FAD moiety is the location of enzymatic activity and is covalently bound to His114 and Cys176. FAD is also bound by hydrogen bonds with neighboring amino acid main chains and side chains. The co-crystallization of THCA synthase with substrate or product has not been accomplished yet.

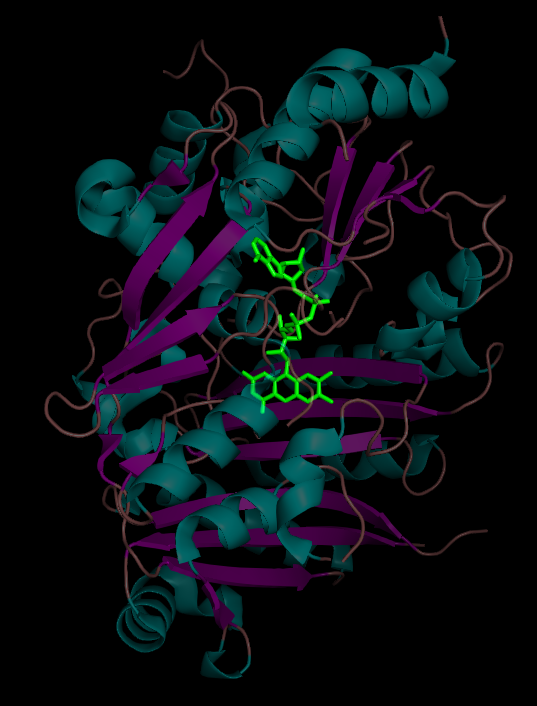
FAD cofactor (in green) is located between domain I and domain II of THCA synthase. Alpha helices are cyan and beta sheets are magenta.

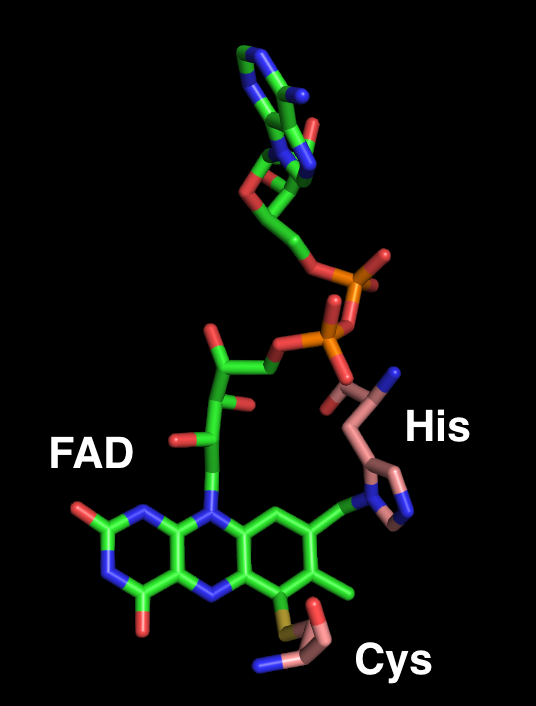
FAD (in green) is covalently bound to histidine 114 and cysteine 176 (in pink).

== Reaction mechanism ==
Chemical structure of cannabigerolic acid (CBGA), the substrate for THCA synthase.

THCA synthase, a flavoprotein, uses a flavin adenine dinucleotide (FAD) cofactor to catalyze the oxidative cyclization of the monoterpene moiety of cannabigerolic acid (CBGA). Similar cyclization reactions occur in monoterpene biosynthesis from geranyl pyrophosphate, but are not oxidative. THCA synthase exhibits no catalytic activity against cannabigerol, which lacks a carboxyl group compared to CBGA, suggesting that the carboxyl group of CBGA is necessary for the reaction to occur.

The overall chemical reaction is: CBGA + O_{2} $\rightleftharpoons$ THCA + H_{2}O_{2}

Chemical structure of tetrahydrocannabinolic acid (THCA), the product of THCA synthase.

A hydride is transferred from CBGA to reduce FAD, concerted by deprotonation of a hydroxyl group by a tyrosine residue. The monoterpene moiety in CBGA is then positioned to complete cyclization into THCA. Oxidation of reduced FAD by O_{2} produces hydrogen peroxide (H_{2}O_{2}).

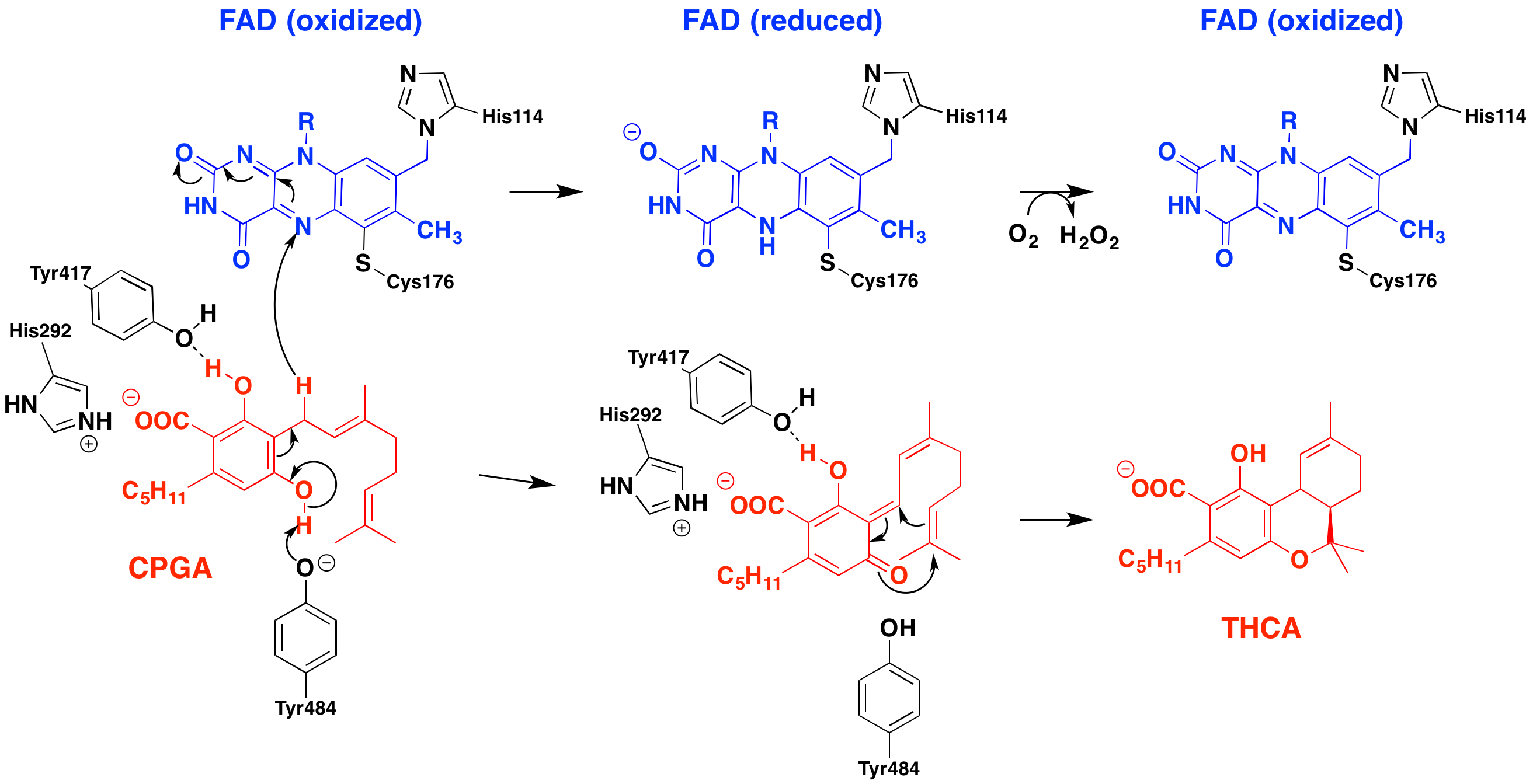
Reaction mechanism of THCA synthase. Modified from Shoyama et al. J. Mol. Bio. 2012.

== Biological function ==
THCA synthase is expressed in the glandular trichomes of Cannabis sativa. THCA synthase may contribute to the self-defense of Cannabis plants by producing THCA and hydrogen peroxide, which are both cytotoxic. Because these products are toxic to the plant, THCA synthase is secreted into the trichome storage cavity. THCA also acts as a necrosis-inducing factor by opening mitochondrial permeability transition pores, inhibiting mitochondrial viability and resulting in senescence in leaf tissues.

Non-enzymatic decarboxylation of THCA during storage or smoking forms THC, the principal psychoactive component of cannabis. Further degradation by temperature, auto-oxidation, and light forms cannabinol. THC and other cannabinoids are well-known to reduce nausea and vomiting and stimulate hunger, particularly in patients undergoing cancer chemotherapy.

Similar enzymes to THCA synthase catalyze the formation of other cannabinoids. For example, cannabidiolic acid (CBDA) synthase is a flavoprotein that catalyzes a similar oxidative cyclization of CPGA into CBDA, the dominant cannabinoid constituent of fiber-type C. sativa. CBDA undergoes a similar decarboxylation to form cannabidiol.

== Significance ==
Demand is high for pharmaceutical grade THC and other cannabinoids due to interest in their potential therapeutic use, but is stymied by legal regulations of C. sativa cultivation in many countries. Direct chemical synthesis of THC is difficult due to high costs and low yields. Therefore, the use of THCA synthase for the production of THC has been explored, as CBGA is easy to synthesize and THCA readily decarboxylates to form THC. Biosynthesis of THCA by expressing THCA synthase in organisms has been attempted in bacteria, insects, and tobacco plants with limited success. Production of THCA on a milligram scale has been demonstrated in Pichia pastoris yeast cells in two independent studies.
