= 3,5,7-Trioxododecanoyl-CoA synthase =

Class of enzymes

Identifiers
- EC no.: 2.3.1.206

Databases
- IntEnz: IntEnz view
- BRENDA: BRENDA entry
- ExPASy: NiceZyme view
- KEGG: KEGG entry
- MetaCyc: metabolic pathway
- PRIAM: profile
- PDB structures: RCSB PDB PDBe PDBsum
Search
- PMC: articles
- PubMed: articles
- NCBI: proteins

3,5,7-Trioxododecanoyl-CoA synthase (EC 2.3.1.206, TKS) is an enzyme with systematic name malonyl-CoA:hexanoyl-CoA malonyltransferase (3,5,7-trioxododecanoyl-CoA-forming). This enzyme catalyses the following chemical reaction

3 malonyl-CoA + hexanoyl-CoA $\rightleftharpoons$ 3 CoA + 3,5,7-trioxododecanoyl-CoA + 3 CO_{2}

This polyketide synthase catalyse the first step in the cannabinoids biosynthetic pathway of the plant Cannabis sativa.
