= Cannabigerolic acid =

Chemical compound

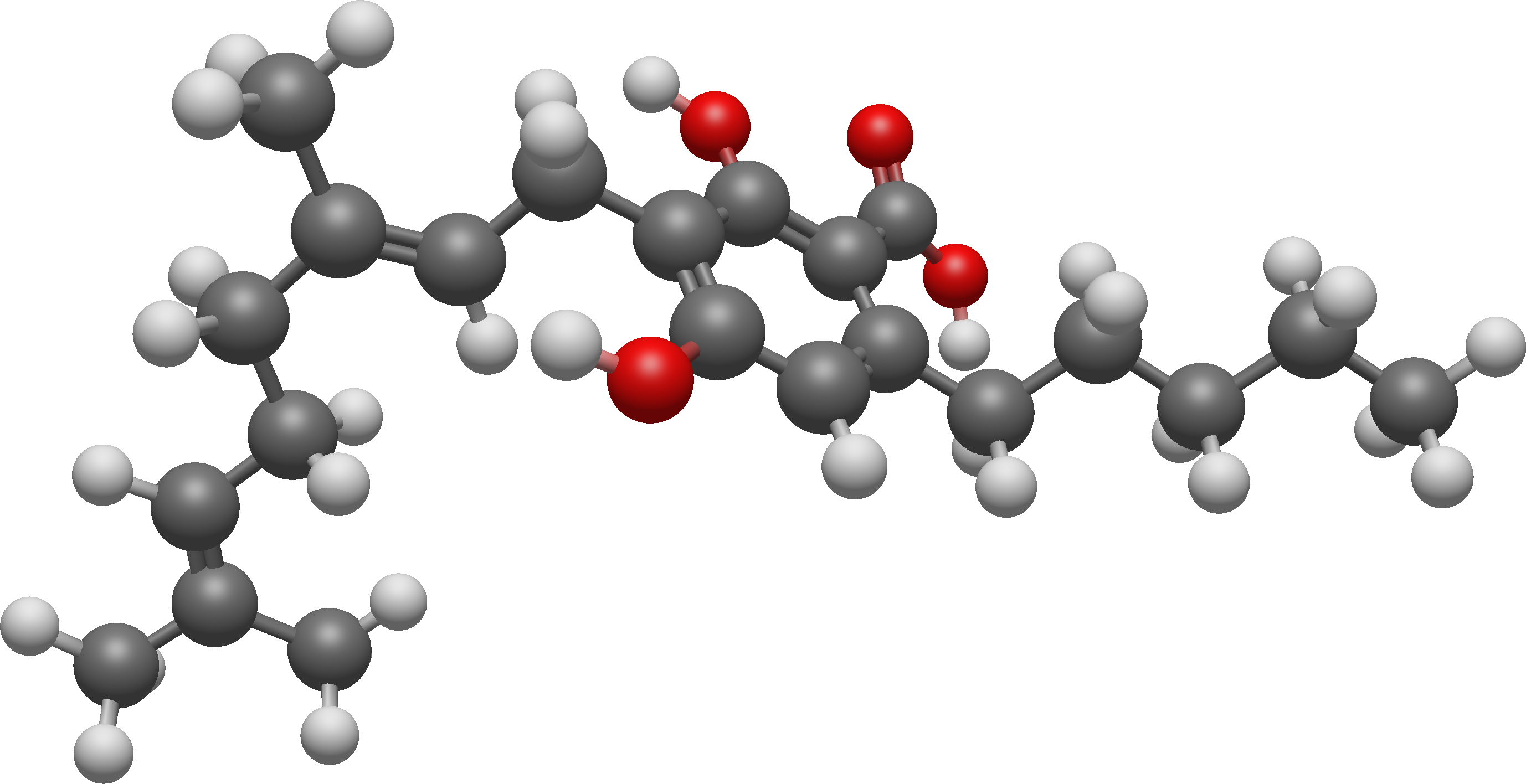

Names
- Preferred IUPAC name 3-[(2E)-3,7-Dimethylocta-2,6-dien-1-yl]-2,4-dihydroxy-6-pentylbenzoic acid

Identifiers
CAS Number	25555-57-1
3D model (JSmol)	Interactive image
ChEBI	CHEBI:67081
ChEMBL	ChEMBL463843
ChemSpider	4952655
KEGG	C20406
PubChem CID	6449999
UNII	80I4ZM847Y
CompTox Dashboard (EPA)	DTXSID401315426
- InChI: InChI=1S/C22H32O4/c1-5-6-7-11-17-14-19(23)18(21(24)20(17)22(25)26)13-12-16(4)10-8-9-15(2)3/h9,12,14,23-24H,5-8,10-11,13H2,1-4H3,(H,25,26)/b16-12+ Key: SEEZIOZEUUMJME-FOWTUZBSSA-N
- SMILES: CCCCCC1=CC(=C(C(=C1C(=O)O)O)C/C=C(\C)/CCC=C(C)C)O

Properties
Chemical formula	C_{22}H_{32}O_{4}
Molar mass	360.494 g·mol^{−1}
- Except where otherwise noted, data are given for materials in their standard state (at 25 °C [77 °F], 100 kPa). Infobox references

Biosynthesis of tetrahydrocannabinolic acid (THCA). In the first step, geranyl pyrophosphate and olivetolic acid form cannabigerolic acid, which is then enzymatically rearranged to THCA in the second step.

Cannabigerolic acid (CBGA) is the acidic form of cannabigerol (CBG). It is a dihydroxybenzoic acid and olivetolic acid in which the hydrogen at position 3 is substituted by a geranyl group. It is a biosynthetic precursor to Delta-9-tetrahydrocannabinol, which is the principal psychoactive constituent of the Cannabis plant. It is also a meroterpenoid (i.e. a polyketide and a terpenoid), a member of resorcinols and a phytocannabinoid. It derives from an olivetolic acid. It is a conjugate acid of a cannabigerolate.

In the Cannabis plant, olivetolic acid and geranyl diphosphate are synthesized into CBGA. CBGA is converted in the plant by CBCA synthase, CBDA synthase and THCA synthase into CBCA, CBDA and THCA respectively.
