= Olivetol =

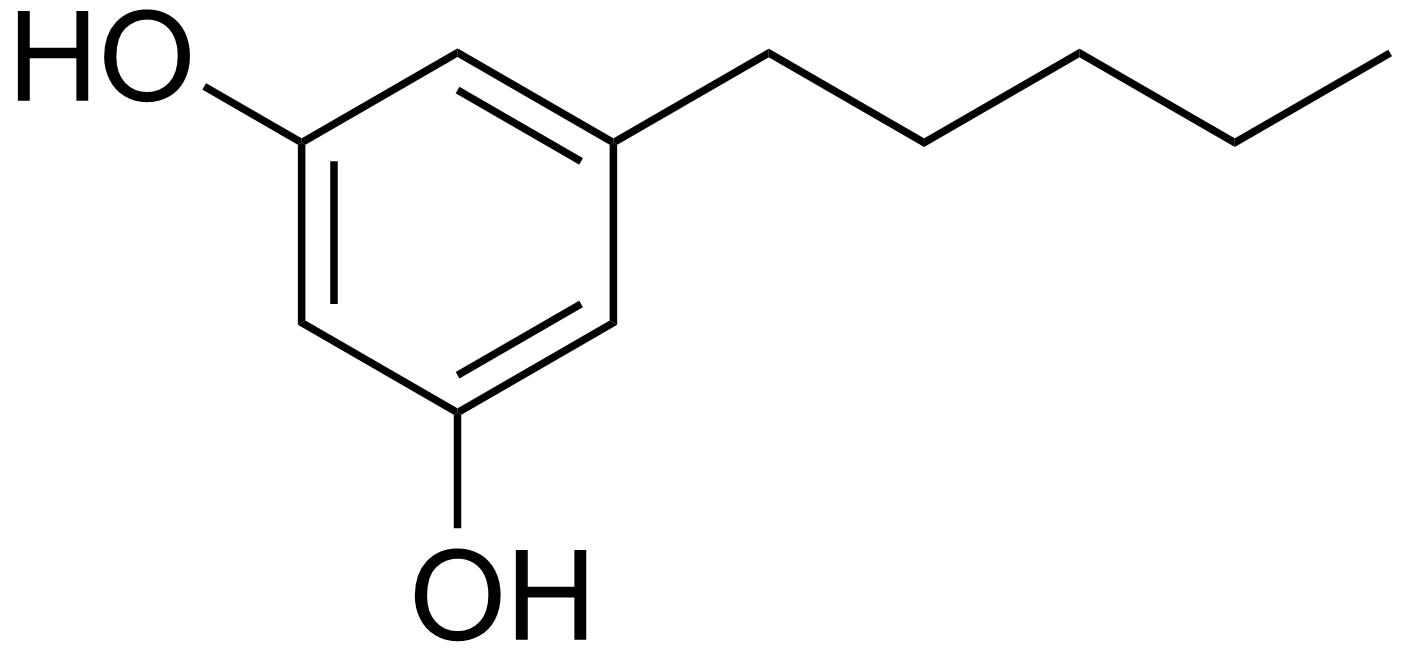

Names
- Preferred IUPAC name 5-Pentylbenzene-1,3-diol
- Other names 5-Pentyl-1,3-benzenediol; 5-Pentylresorcinol; 5-n-Amylresorcinol

Identifiers
| CAS Number | 500-66-3 |
| 3D model (JSmol) | Interactive image |
| ChEBI | CHEBI:66960 |
| ChemSpider | 9949 |
| ECHA InfoCard | 100.007.190 |
| EC Number | 207-908-8 |
| PubChem CID | 10377 |
| UNII | 65OP0NEZ1P |
| CompTox Dashboard (EPA) | DTXSID0025812 |
- InChI: InChI=1S/C11H16O2/c1-2-3-4-5-9-6-10(12)8-11(13)7-9/h6-8,12-13H,2-5H2,1H3 Key: IRMPFYJSHJGOPE-UHFFFAOYSA-N; InChI=1/C11H16O2/c1-2-3-4-5-9-6-10(12)8-11(13)7-9/h6-8,12-13H,2-5H2,1H3 Key: IRMPFYJSHJGOPE-UHFFFAOYAG
- SMILES: CCCCCC1=CC(=CC(=C1)O)O

Properties
| Chemical formula | C_{11}H_{16}O_{2} |
| Molar mass | 180.247 g·mol^{−1} |
| Appearance | colorless solid |
| Melting point | 40 to 41 °C (104 to 106 °F; 313 to 314 K) (49 to 49.5 °C) |
| Boiling point | 162 to 164 °C (324 to 327 °F; 435 to 437 K) at 5 mmHg; 192-195 °C at 11 mmHg |
- Except where otherwise noted, data are given for materials in their standard state (at 25 °C [77 °F], 100 kPa). verify (what is ?) Infobox references

Olivetol is an organic compound with the formula C_{5}H_{11}C_{6}H_{3}(OH)_{2}. Several isomers exist; olivetol has the two hydroxyl and the pentyl groups located at the 1,3, and 5 positions on the benzene ring. It is a colorless solid that is soluble in a variety of organic solvents. It is found in certain species of lichen. It is also a precursor in various syntheses of tetrahydrocannabinol.

== Occurrence ==
Olivetol is found in certain species of lichens, from which it can be readily extracted.

Olivetol is also produced by a number of insects, either as a pheromone, repellent, or antiseptic.

The cannabis plant produces the related substance olivetolic acid (OLA), which may be involved in the biosynthesis of tetrahydrocannabinol (THC).

== Synthesis of THC analogs ==
Olivetol is used in various methods to produce synthetic analogs of THC. One such method is a condensation reaction of olivetol and geraniol in the presence of boron trifluoride, which affords a cannabigerol.

In PiHKAL, Alexander Shulgin reports a cruder method of producing the same product by bringing to reaction olivetol and the essential oil of orange in the presence of phosphoryl chloride.

A method for the synthesis of THC itself consists of the condensation reaction between olivetol and Δ^{2}-carene oxide.

== Legality ==
The production, possession, and/or distribution of olivetol is not outlawed by any country; however, in the United States, it is a DEA watched precursor.

== Biosynthesis ==
Olivetol is biosynthesized by a polyketide synthase (PKS)-type reaction from hexanoyl-CoA and three molecules of malonyl-CoA by an aldol condensation of a tetraketide intermediate. In 2009, Taura et al. was able to clone a type III PKS named olivetol synthase (OLS) from Cannabis sativa. This PKS is a homodimeric protein that consists of a 385 amino acid polypeptide with a molecular mass of 42,585 Da that has high sequence similarity (60-70%) identity to plant PKSs.

The data from Taura's study of OLS's enzyme kinetics show that OLS catalyzes a decarboxylative-aldol condensation to produce olivetol. This is similar to stilbene synthase's (STS) mechanism for converting p-coumaroyl-CoA and malonyl-CoA to resveratrol. Although olivetol is the decarboxylated form of OLA, it is highly unlikely that OLS produces olivetol from OLA. Crude enzyme extracts prepared from flowers and leaves did not synthesize olivetolic acid, but only yielded olivetol. The exact mechanism of olivetol biosynthesis is as yet unsure, but it is possible that an OLA-forming metabolic complex forms along with OLS. In addition, it also appears that OLS only specifically accepts starter CoA esters with C4 to C8 aliphatic side chains such as hexanoyl-CoA.

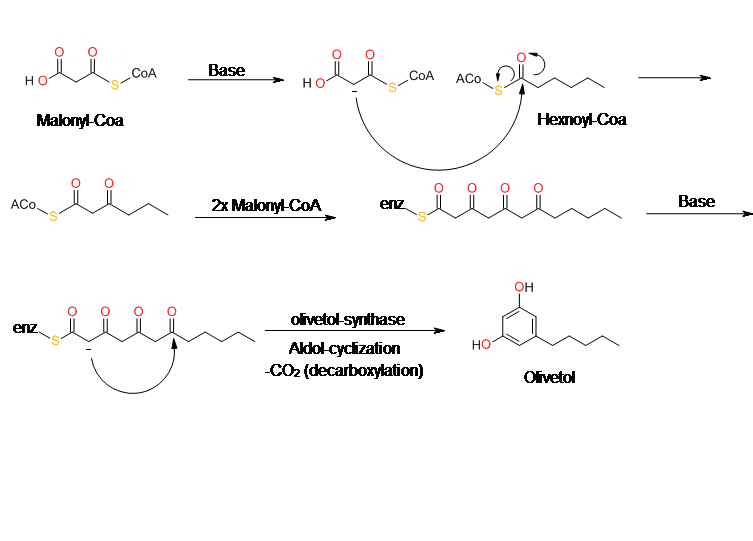
Biosynthesis of olivetol
