= Cannabis concentrate =

Preparation of cannabis

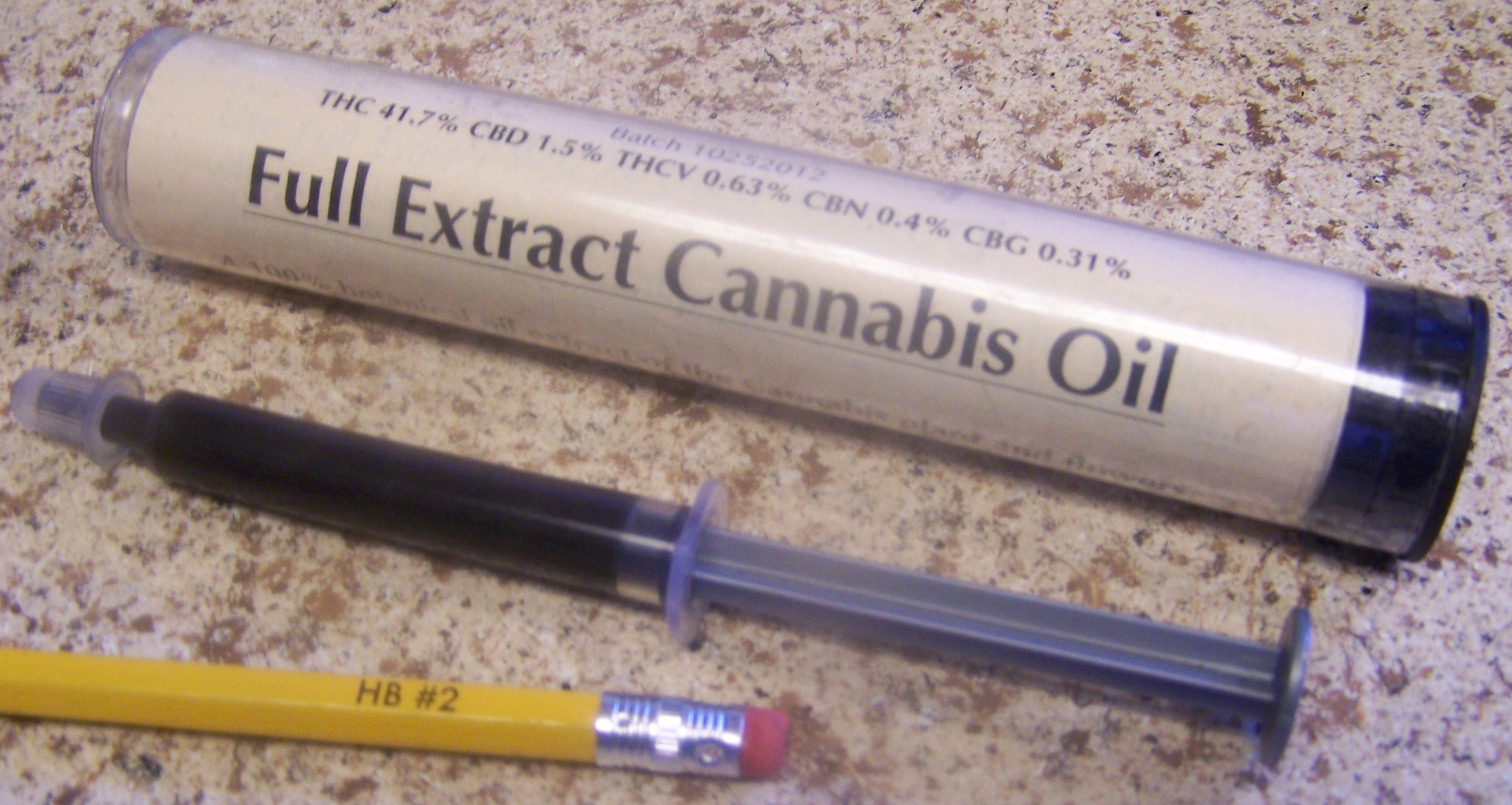
Product labeled "full extract cannabis oil"

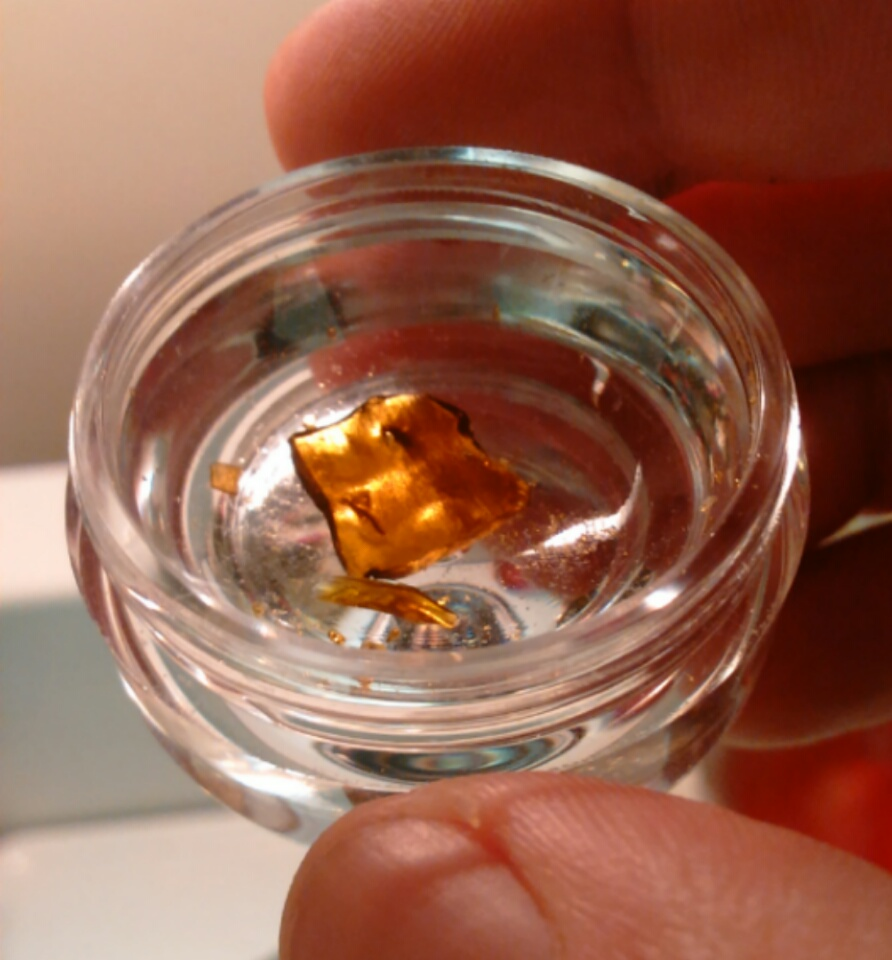
Extract in a lip balm-sized container

Cannabis concentrate, also called marijuana concentrate, marijuana extract, or cannabis extract, is a tetrahydrocannabinol (THC) and/or cannabidiol (CBD) concentrated mass. Cannabis concentrates contain high THC levels that range from 40% to over 90%, stronger in THC content than high-grade marijuana, which normally measures around 20% THC levels.

Volatile solvents, such as ethanol, butane, propane or hexane, may be used to prepare extracts, but can possibly lead to fire and explosion hazards in uncontrolled environments. Supercritical carbon dioxide (CO_{2}) extraction alleviates concerns of fire and explosion and results in a high-quality product.

Legally produced concentrates for retail sale in legalized U.S. states are often packaged in small lip balm-sized containers.

== Legal status ==
=== Colorado ===
In Colorado, the Marijuana Enforcement Division (MED) regulates almost every facet of the cannabis seed-to-sale process. There are heavy regulations on the containers that hold the concentrate: containers must be child-resistant, opaque, and have a multitude of legal text warning the consumer of the risks of consumption. MED also regulates the creation or extraction of cannabis extract.

== List of concentrates ==
Common types of cannabis concentrate:

- Badder/budder
- Cannabis flower essential oil
- Caviar (moon rocks)—cannabis buds dipped in or sprayed with hash oil, then rolled in kief.
- Crumble
- Crystalline
- Distillate
- Dry sift
- Hash oil
  - Fully extracted cannabis oil
  - Butane hash oil (BHO)
  - CO_{2} oil
- Honeycomb
- Pull and snap
- Resin / Trichomes
  - Charas—a cannabis concentrate created by expressing the living flower of Cannabis indica between the hands and removing the residue.
  - Hashish or hash—a cannabis concentrate traditionally made by drying the cannabis plant and beating the dried female plant material over a series of screens and then sifting, collecting, and pressing the particles.
    - Bubble hash—water-purified hashish
  - Kief
  - Live resin/rosin
- Shatter
- Taffy
- Terp sauce
- Tincture of cannabis
- Wax

The major difference between live resin and other cannabis concentrates lies in the way they are produced. The manufacturing of live resin involves fresh, live cannabis either freshly harvested or flash-frozen cannabis. This helps protect plant's content matter, aroma and flavor.
