= Kief =

Accumulation of cannabis trichomes

Kief (from Arabic: كيف kīf, "Joy, pleasure"), sometimes transliterated as keef, also known as "Dust" and "Chief" a.k.a. cannabis crystals among other names, refers to the accumulation of detached cannabis trichomes, typically collected by sifting cannabis flowers through a fine mesh screen or sieve. Like some other cannabis concentrates, it contains a much higher concentration of THC and other psychoactive cannabinoids than that of the cannabis flower from which it is derived. Since it contains a higher level of THC, many consumers choose to add collected kief to their cannabis for a more intense "high"; by the same token, this preparation may induce unwelcome levels of intoxication.

Traditionally, kief has been pressed into cakes of hashish for convenience in storage, although it can be vaporized or smoked in either form. After the kief is collected it is heated and pressed, resulting in hashish.

In Morocco, kief also refers to a traditional mix of finely-chopped cannabis and indigenous tobacco, which is distinctly different from trichome powder. It is usually smoked in a long pipe called a sebsi. In other countries, such as the US and those of Western Europe, kief is used to make products via infusions. Some examples are baked cookies, brownies or other edibles. Due to its potency, however, some users consume only a small quantity of kief in order to limit its effects.

== Gallery ==
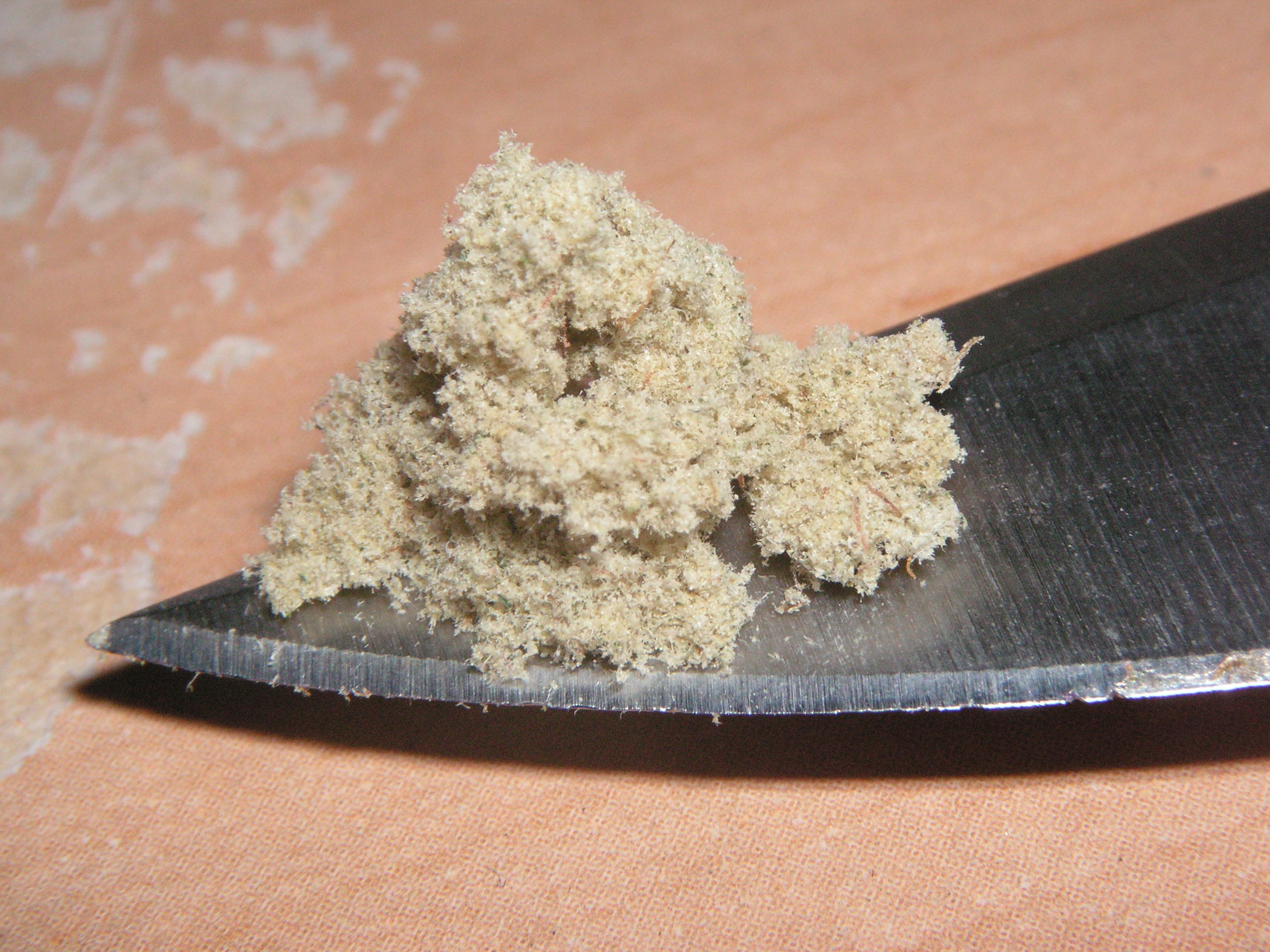
Kief collected from a grinder with a screen

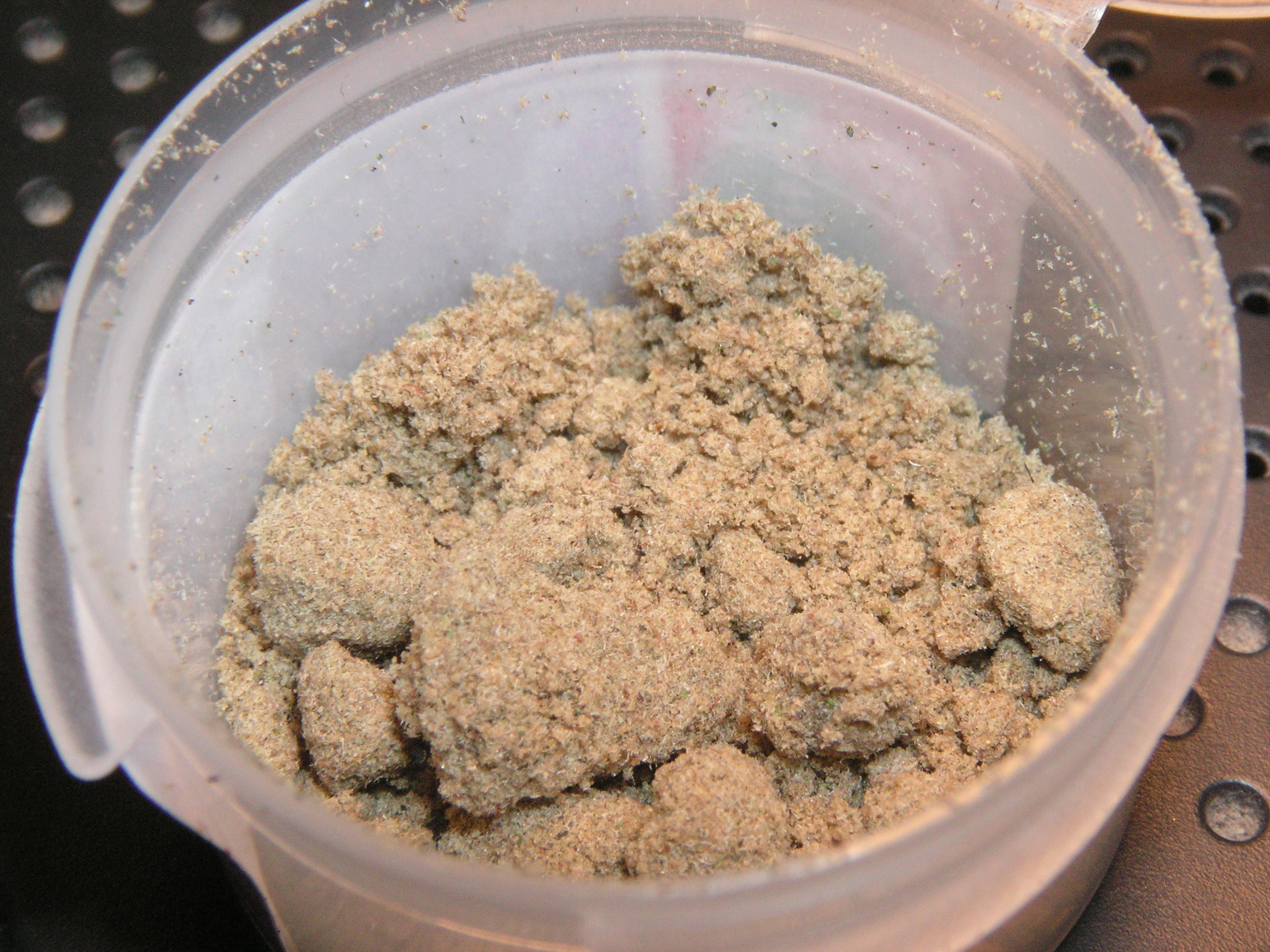
Kief collected from a sieve

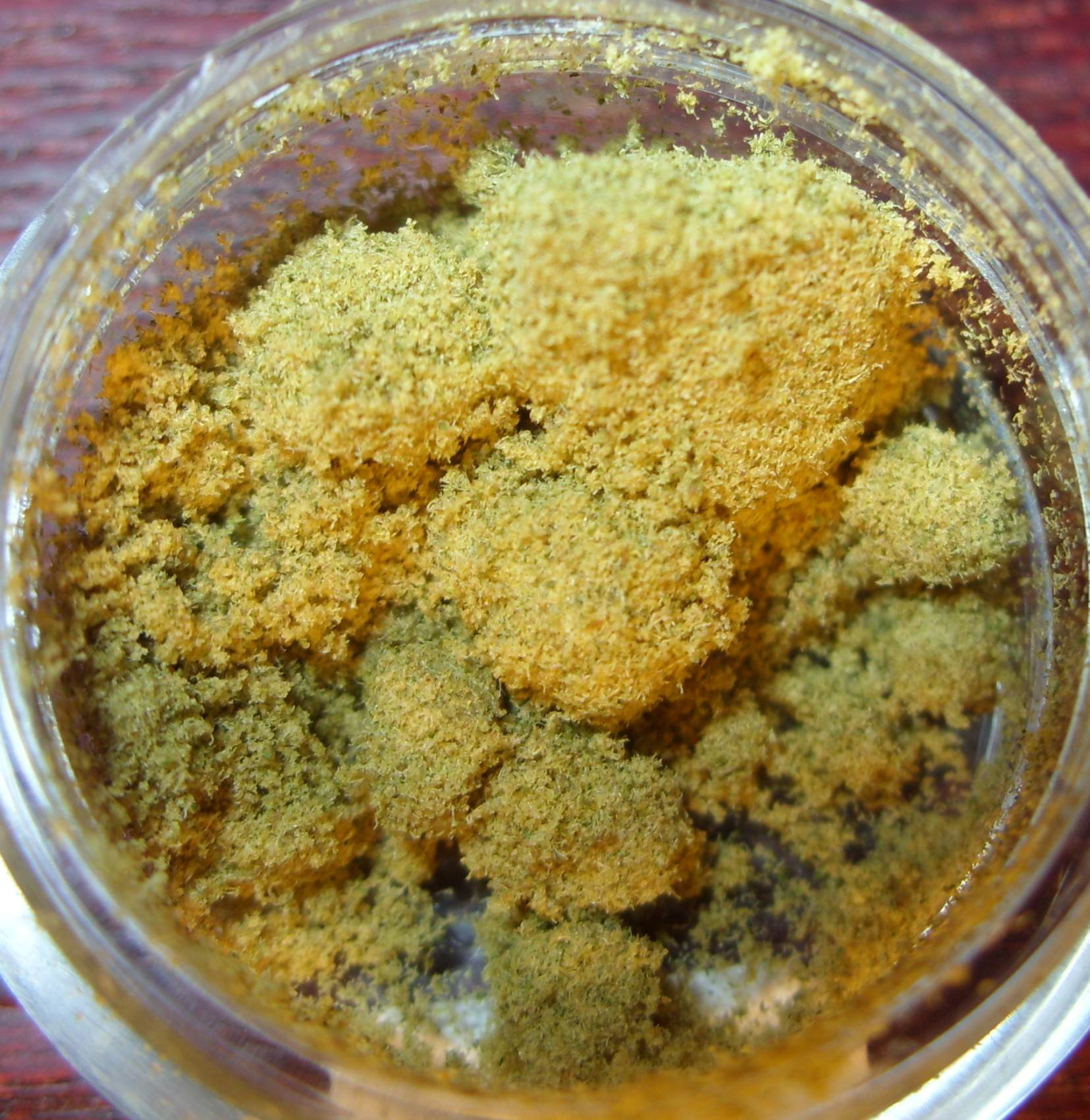
Approximately one gram of screen-sifted cannabis trichomes, commonly referred to as kief

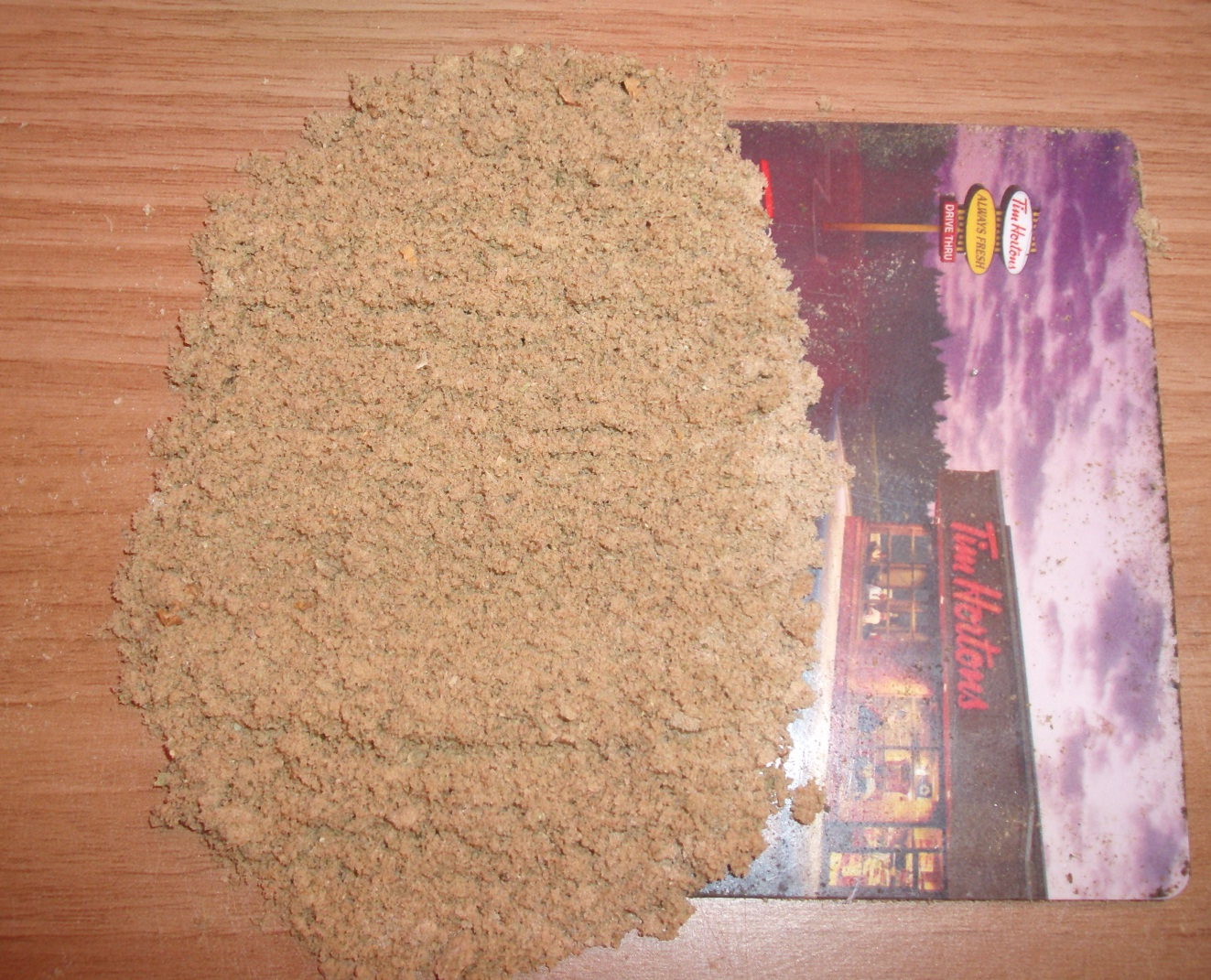
Kief collected from a grinder

== See also ==
- Hash oil
- Bhang
- Charas
