= Cannabidiolic acid =

Names
- Preferred IUPAC name (1′R,2′R)-2,6-Dihydroxy-5′-methyl-4-pentyl-2′-(prop-1-en-2-yl)-1′,2′,3′,4′-tetrahydro[1,1′-biphenyl]-3-carboxylic acid

Identifiers
CAS Number	1244-58-2
3D model (JSmol)	Interactive image
ChEBI	CHEBI:3359
ChEMBL	ChEMBL498672
ChemSpider	141099
KEGG	C10784
PubChem CID	160570
UNII	FJX8O3OJCD
CompTox Dashboard (EPA)	DTXSID80154318
- InChI: InChI=1S/C22H30O4/c1-5-6-7-8-15-12-18(23)20(21(24)19(15)22(25)26)17-11-14(4)9-10-16(17)13(2)3/h11-12,16-17,23-24H,2,5-10H2,1,3-4H3,(H,25,26)/t16-,17+/m0/s1 Key: WVOLTBSCXRRQFR-DLBZAZTESA-N
- SMILES: CCCCCC1=CC(=C(C(=C1C(=O)O)O)[C@@H]2C=C(CC[C@H]2C(=C)C)C)O

Properties
Chemical formula	C_{22}H_{30}O_{4}
Molar mass	358.478 g·mol^{−1}
- Except where otherwise noted, data are given for materials in their standard state (at 25 °C [77 °F], 100 kPa). Infobox references

Cannabidiolic acid (CBDA), is a cannabinoid produced in cannabis plants. It is the precursor to cannabidiol (CBD). It is most abundant in the glandular trichomes on the female seedless flowers or more accurately infructescence often colloquially referred to as buds or flowers.

== Biosynthesis ==
Cannabidiolic acid is a natural product sesquiterpene biosynthesized in cannabis via Cannabidiolic acid synthase from the conjugation of olivetolic acid and cannabigerolic acid.

== Decarboxylation ==
CBDA is the chemical precursor to cannabidiol (CBD). Through the process of decarboxylation, cannabidiol is derived through loss of the carbon and two oxygen atoms that make up the carboxylic acid moeity on the aromatic ring.
