= Cannabidiolic acid synthase =

Class of enzymes

Identifiers
- EC no.: 1.21.3.8

Databases
- BRENDA: enzyme data
- ExPASy: NiceZyme view
- KEGG: enzyme entry
- MetaCyc: metabolic pathway
- Rhea: reactions
- PDB structures: RCSB PDB PDBe PDBsum
Search
- PMC: articles
- PubMed: articles
- NCBI: proteins

Cannabidiolic acid synthase (EC 1.21.3.8, CBDA synthase) is an enzyme with systematic name cannabigerolate:oxygen oxidoreductase (cyclizing, cannabidiolate-forming). It is an oxidoreductase found in Cannabis sativa that catalyses the formation of cannabidiolate, a carboxylated precursor of cannabidiol.

== Enzyme structure ==
Cannabidiolic acid synthase consists of a single protein with a molecular mass of 74 kDa. Its amino acid sequence is partly (40-50%) homologous to several other oxidoreductases, such as berberine bridge enzyme in Eschscholzia californica and Nectarin V in Nicotiana langsdorffii X N. sanderae.

CBDA synthase has four binding sites; two for FAD and two for the substrate.

== Enzyme function ==
Cannabidiolic acid synthase catalyses the production of cannabidiolate predominantly from cannabigerolate by stereospecific oxidative cyclization of the geranyl group of cannabigerolic acid according to the following chemical reaction:

cannabigerolate + O_{2} → cannabidiolate + H_{2}O_{2}

Cannabinerolate can also be used as a substrate, but with lower efficiency (K_{M}=0.137 mM) than cannabigerolate (K_{M}=0.206 mM). It covalently binds FAD, and does require coenzymes & molecular oxygen for the oxidocyclization reaction.

The optimum pH for CBDA synthase is 5.0.
