= Olivetolic acid =

Names
- Preferred IUPAC name 2,4-Dihydroxy-6-pentylbenzoic acid

Identifiers
CAS Number	491-72-5
3D model (JSmol)	Interactive image
ChEBI	CHEBI:66955
ChEMBL	ChEMBL3134414
ChemSpider	2104822
PubChem CID	2826719
UNII	3Y8J575L93
CompTox Dashboard (EPA)	DTXSID20197688
- InChI: InChI=1S/C12H16O4/c1-2-3-4-5-8-6-9(13)7-10(14)11(8)12(15)16/h6-7,13-14H,2-5H2,1H3,(H,15,16) Key: SXFKFRRXJUJGSS-UHFFFAOYSA-N
- SMILES: CCCCCC1=C(C(=CC(=C1)O)O)C(=O)O

Properties
Chemical formula	C_{12}H_{16}O_{4}
Molar mass	224.256 g·mol^{−1}
Appearance	colorless solid
Melting point	148–9 °C (298–48 °F; 421–282 K)

Related compounds
Related compounds	Cannabidiolic acid
- Except where otherwise noted, data are given for materials in their standard state (at 25 °C [77 °F], 100 kPa). Infobox references

Olivetolic acid is an organic compound with the formula C_{5}H_{11}C_{6}H_{2}(OH)_{2}CO_{2}H. Several isomers with this formula exist. Olivetolic acid can be viewed as a derivative of olivetol ( 1,3,5-C_{5}H_{11}C_{6}H_{2}(OH)_{2}CO_{2}H, with a carboxylic acid group adjacent to the pentyl (C_{5}H_{11}) group. Olivetolic acid has attracted attention because it is an intermediate in the biosynthetic pathway of the cannabinoids, found in Cannabis sativa.

The ester dimer of olivetolic acid, anziaic acid, is found in lichen.
