= Cannabinoid =

Compounds found in cannabis

Cannabinoids (/kəˈnæbənɔɪdzˌ ˈkænəbənɔɪdz/) are several structural classes of compounds found primarily in the Cannabis plant or as synthetic compounds. Cannabinoids can be classified into two categories: major cannabinoids, which are present in high amounts in the Cannabis plant, and minor cannabinoids, which are present in smaller amounts in the Cannabis plant. The most notable and the most abundant major cannabinoid is the phytocannabinoid tetrahydrocannabinol (THC) (delta-9-THC). It is a primary psychoactive compound in Cannabis, capable of inducing the feeling of extreme euphoria and loss of memory. Cannabidiol (CBD) is a major constituent of temperate cannabis plants and a minor constituent in tropical varieties. Unlike THC, CBD is non-psychoactive and helps with anxiety and psychosis symptoms. Minor cannabinoids, such as cannabinol (CBN) and cannabichromene (CBC), have not been shown to induce any intoxicating or psychotropic effects. At least 113 distinct phytocannabinoids have been isolated from cannabis, although only four (THCA, CBDA, CBCA, and their common precursor CBGA) have a confirmed biogenetic origin. Phytocannabinoids are also found in other plants, such as rhododendron, licorice, and liverwort.

Phytocannabinoids are multi-ring phenolic compounds structurally related to THC, while endocannabinoids are fatty acid derivatives. Nonclassical synthetic cannabinoids (cannabimimetics) include aminoalkylindoles, 1,5-diarylpyrazoles, quinolines, and arylsulfonamides, as well as eicosanoids related to endocannabinoids.

== History ==
Cannabinol (CBN) was the first cannabinoid isolated in the late 1800s, with its structure elucidated in the 1930s and synthesized by 1940. In 1942, Roger Adams discovered cannabidiol (CBD), followed by Raphael Mechoulam's identification of CBD stereochemistry in 1963 and THC stereochemistry in 1964. CBD and THC are produced independently from the precursor CBG, not via conversion.

== Uses ==
Medical uses of cannabinoids include the treatment of nausea due to chemotherapy, spasticity, and possibly neuropathic pain. Common side effects include dizziness, sedation, confusion, dissociation, and "feeling high".

=== Parkinson's disease ===
Cannabis may provide limited relief for some Parkinson's disease (PD) symptoms, such as pain, sleep issues, or anxiety, based on small human studies (2023–2024, 10–50 participants), but it does not improve motor symptoms like tremors or stiffness (no significant change in Unified Parkinson's Disease Rating Scale scores). A 2023 US survey found 46% of PD patients reported benefits for pain or sleep. Raw Cannabis contains tetrahydrocannabinolic acid (THCA, 15–30% of the plant) and cannabidiolic acid (CBDA), which are non-psychoactive. No human studies have tested THCA or CBDA for PD as of 2025. In regions like India, raw cannabis is used traditionally for tremors, but scientific evidence is lacking. Risks include dizziness from THC (12–20% dropout in studies) and potential interactions with PD medications like levodopa.

== Cannabinoid receptors ==
Before the 1980s, cannabinoids were thought to produce their effects via nonspecific interaction with cell membranes, rather than specific membrane-bound receptors. The discovery of cannabinoid receptors in the 1980s resolved this debate. These receptors are common in animals, with two primary types, CB_{1} and CB_{2}, and evidence suggests additional receptors may exist. The human brain has more cannabinoid receptors than any other G protein-coupled receptor (GPCR) type.

The endocannabinoid system (ECS) regulates multiple functions, including movement, motor coordination, learning, memory, emotion, motivation, addictive-like behavior, and pain modulation.

=== Cannabinoid receptor type 1 ===
CB_{1} receptors are found primarily in the brain, particularly in the basal ganglia, limbic system, hippocampus, and striatum. They are also present in the cerebellum, and male and female reproductive systems, but absent in the medulla oblongata, which controls respiratory and cardiovascular functions. CB1 is also found in the human anterior eye and retina.

=== Cannabinoid receptor type 2 ===
CB_{2} receptors are predominantly found in the immune system or immune-derived cells, with varying expression patterns. A subpopulation of microglia in the human cerebellum expresses CB_{2}. CB_{2} receptors are linked to immunomodulatory effects and potential therapeutic benefits in animal models.

== Phytocannabinoids ==
The classical cannabinoids are concentrated in a viscous resin produced in structures known as glandular trichomes. At least 113 different cannabinoids have been isolated from the Cannabis plant.

All classes derive from cannabigerol-type (CBG) compounds and differ mainly in the way this precursor is cyclized. The classical cannabinoids are derived from their respective 2-carboxylic acids (2-COOH) by decarboxylation (catalyzed by heat, light, or alkaline conditions).

=== Well known cannabinoids ===
The best-studied cannabinoids include tetrahydrocannabinol (THC), cannabidiol (CBD), and cannabinol (CBN).

==== Tetrahydrocannabinol ====
9-∆-Tetrahydrocannabinol (THC) Organic Structure

Tetrahydrocannabinol (THC) is the primary psychoactive component of the Cannabis plant. Delta-9-tetrahydrocannabinol (Δ^{9}-THC, THC) and delta-8-tetrahydrocannabinol (Δ^{8}-THC) induce anandamide and 2-arachidonoylglycerol synthesis through intracellular CB_{1} activation. These cannabinoids produce the psychoactive effects of cannabis by binding to CB_{1} receptors in the brain.

==== Cannabidiol ====
Cannabidiol (CBD) Organic Structure

Cannabidiol (CBD) is mildly psychotropic and counteracts cognitive impairment associated with cannabis use. CBD has low affinity for CB_{1} and CB_{2} receptors but acts as an indirect antagonist of cannabinoid agonists. It is an agonist at the 5-HT_{1A} receptor and may promote sleep and suppress arousal by interfering with adenosine uptake. CBD shares a precursor with THC and is the main cannabinoid in CBD-dominant Cannabis strains, potentially reducing short-term memory loss associated with THC. Tentative evidence suggests CBD may have anti-psychotic effects, though research is limited. CBD and other cannabinoids have shown antimicrobial properties, potentially addressing antimicrobial resistance.

==== Cannabinol ====
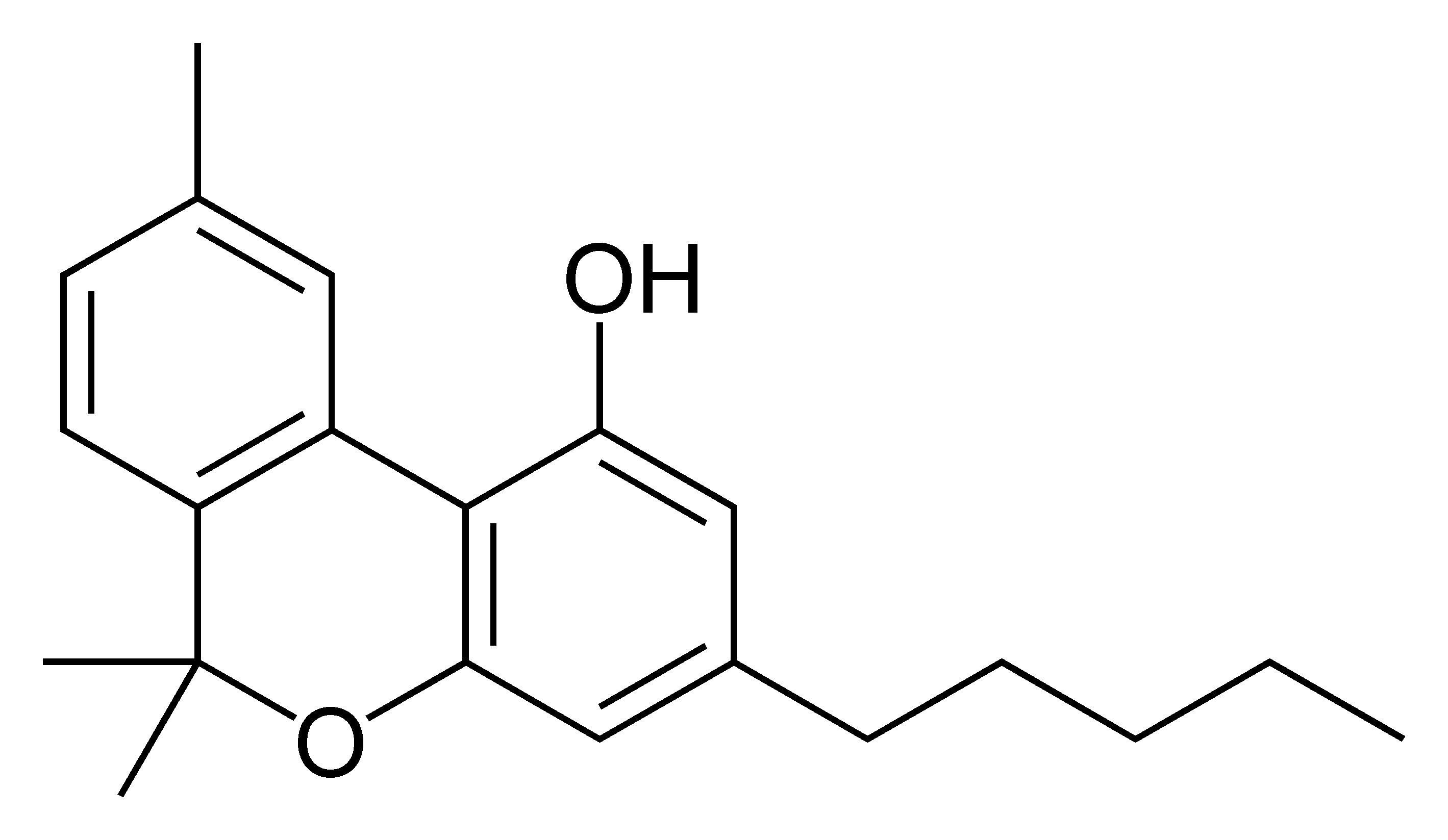
Cannabinol (CBN) Organic Structure

Cannabinol (CBN) is a mildly psychoactive cannabinoid acting as a low-affinity partial agonist at CB_{1} and CB_{2} receptors. CBN interacts with other neurotransmitter systems (e.g., dopaminergic, serotonergic), requiring higher doses for physiologic effects like mild sedation compared to THC. Isolated in the late 1800s, its structure was elucidated in the 1930s, and chemical synthesis was achieved by 1940. Recent studies indicate that CBN exhibits antiproliferative effects against glioma, liver, and breast cancer cell lines by triggering cell cycle arrest at G1 or S-Phase. In estrogen receptor-positive breast cancer models, CBN was found to be the most effective in suppressing the new synthesis of aromatase, the enzyme responsible for estrogen production that fuels tumor growth, when compared to THC and CBD.

==== Cannabichromene ====
Cannabichromene (CBC) Organic Structure

Cannabichromene (CBC) is a minor non-psychotic phytocannabinoid that is capable of anti-inflammatory, anti-nociceptive, and anti-convulsant properties. Research further indicates that CBC induces programmed cell death via apoptosis and ferroptosis in pancreatic cancer cells by serving as a potent agonist of TRPV1 and CB2 receptors. Also, CBC helps the brain to stay healthy by preventing the Neural Stem Progenitor Cells (NSPCs) from turning into reactive astrocytes, which can cause inflammation that can damage the brain.

=== Biosynthesis ===
Cannabinoid production begins with an enzyme combining geranyl pyrophosphate and olivetolic acid to form CBGA. CBGA is converted to THCA, CBDA, or CBCA by separate synthases, FAD-dependent dehydrogenase enzymes that diverged from a promiscuous common ancestor. There is no enzymatic conversion of CBDA or CBD to THCA or THC. Propyl homologues (CBGVA, THCVA, CBDVA, CBCVA) follow an analogous pathway from divarinolic acid.

=== Double bond position ===
Each cannabinoid may exist in different forms depending on the double bond position in the alicyclic carbon ring. Under the dibenzopyran numbering system, the major form of THC is Δ^{9}-THC, and the minor form is Δ^{8}-THC. In the alternate terpene numbering system, these are Δ^{1}-THC and Δ^{6}-THC, respectively.

=== Length ===
Most classical cannabinoids are 21-carbon compounds, but variations in the side-chain length attached to the aromatic ring exist. In THC, CBD, and CBN, the side-chain is a pentyl (5-carbon) chain. Propyl (3-carbon) chain variants are named with the suffix varin (THCV, CBDV, CBNV), while heptyl (7-carbon) chain variants are named phorol (THCP, CBDP).

=== Cannabinoids in other plants ===
Phytocannabinoids occur in plants like Echinacea purpurea, Echinacea angustifolia, Acmella oleracea, Helichrysum umbraculigerum, and Radula marginata. Echinacea species contain Anandamide-like alkylamides, with at least 25 identified, some showing affinity for CB_{2} receptors. These are concentrated in roots and flowers. Yangonin in kava has significant CB_{1} receptor affinity. Tea (Camellia sinensis) catechins show affinity for human cannabinoid receptors. Beta-caryophyllene, a terpene in cannabis and other plants, is a selective CB_{2} receptor agonist. Black truffles contain anandamide. Perrottetinene, a moderately psychoactive cannabinoid, is found in Radula varieties. Machaeriol A and related compounds occur in Machaerium plants.

Most phytocannabinoids are nearly insoluble in water but soluble in lipids, alcohols, and other non-polar organic solvents.

=== Cannabis plant profile ===
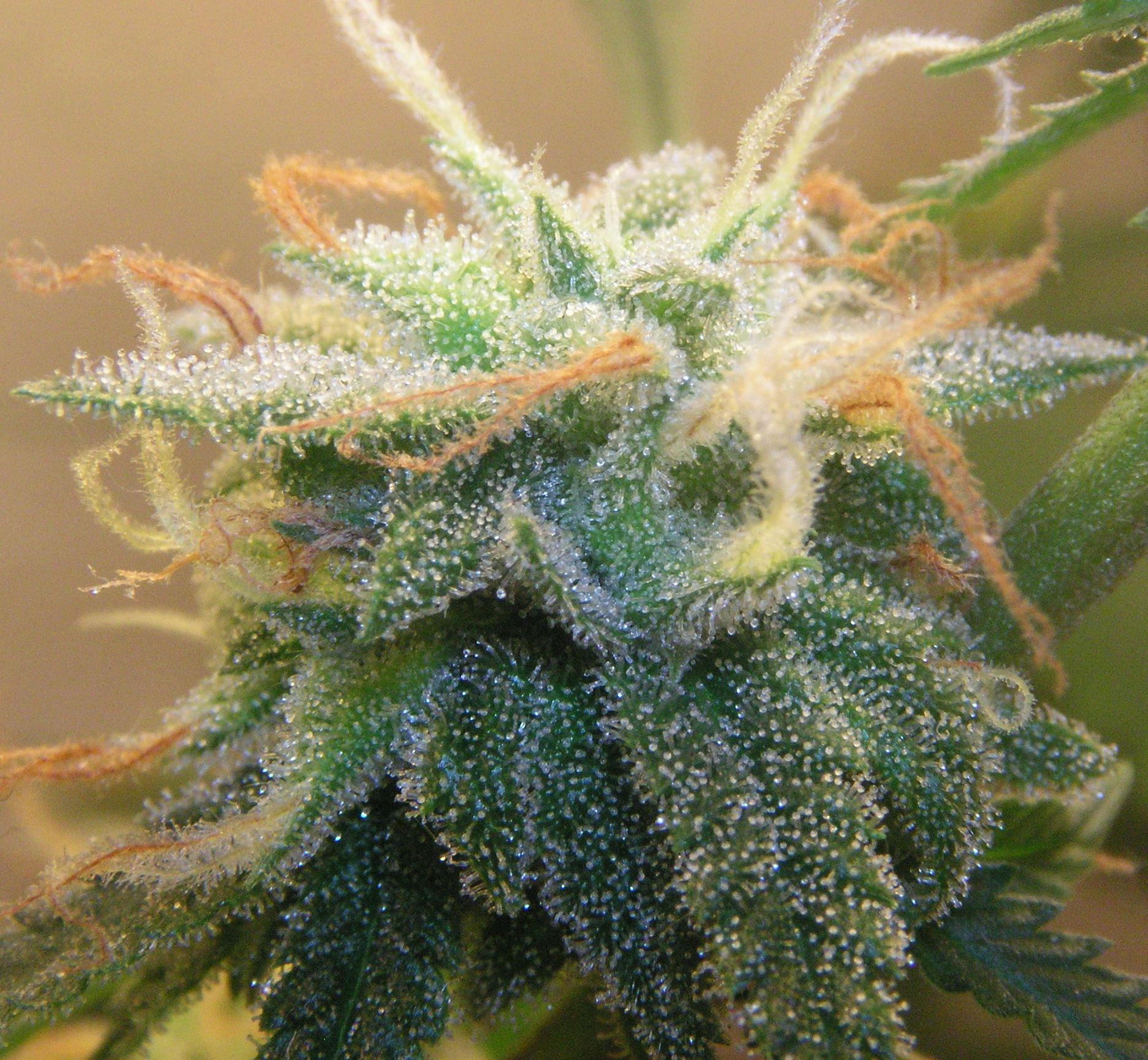
The bracts surrounding a cluster of Cannabis sativa flowers are coated with cannabinoid-laden trichomes.

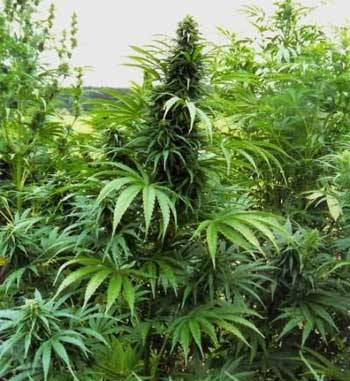
Cannabis indica plant

Historically, cannabis was classified into two main species based on structural traits: Cannabis indica and Cannabis sativa. Cannabis indica is a relatively short plant with broad leaves, while Cannabis sativa is a taller plant with thinner leaves. However, modern taxonomic proposals suggests a single species, Cannabis sativa L., which is further divided into different strains according to their cannabinoid content. Due to the intensive selective breeding, many modern strains do not strictly align with their traditional indica or sativa lineage anymore.

Cannabis plants vary widely in their cannabinoid profiles due to selective breeding. Hemp strains are bred for low THC content, often for fiber, while medical strains may prioritize high CBD, and recreational strains target high THC or specific balances. Quantitative analysis uses gas chromatography (GC), or GC combined with mass spectrometry (GC/MS), to measure cannabinoid content. Liquid chromatography (LC) can differentiate acid (e.g., THCA, CBDA) and neutral (e.g., THC, CBD) forms. Legal restrictions in many countries hinder consistent monitoring of cannabinoid profiles.

=== Pharmacology ===
Cannabinoids are administered via smoking, vaporizing, oral ingestion, transdermal patch, intravenous injection, sublingual absorption, or rectal suppository. Most are metabolized in the liver by cytochrome P450 enzymes, mainly CYP 2C9. Inhibiting CYP 2C9 can extend intoxication. Δ^{9}-THC is metabolized to 11-hydroxy-Δ^{9}-THC and then 9-carboxy-THC, detectable in the body for weeks due to their lipophilic nature and storage in fat. The entourage effect suggests that terpenes modulate cannabinoid effects.

==== Modulation of mitochondrial activity ====
Cannabinoids influence mitochondrial processes, including calcium regulation, apoptosis, electron transport chain activity, mitochondrial respiration and ATP production. Mitochondrial dynamics—encompassing the processes of fusion and fission, as well as alterations in morphology and organelle mobility, are also affected by cannabinoid exposure. In addition, cannabinoids have been shown to modulate mitochondrial biogenesis through the dysregulation of PGC-1α levels. These effects are complex, involving direct membrane interactions and receptor-mediated pathways, but a unified hypothesis is lacking due to conflicting data.

==== Cannabinoid-based pharmaceuticals ====
Nabiximols (Sativex) is an aerosolized mist with a near 1:1 ratio of CBD and THC, used for multiple sclerosis-related pain and spasticity. Dronabinol (Marinol, Syndros) and nabilone (Cesamet) are synthetic THC analogs for HIV/AIDS-induced anorexia and chemotherapy-induced nausea and vomiting. CBD drug Epidiolex is approved for Dravet syndrome and Lennox–Gastaut syndrome.

=== Separation ===
Cannabinoids are extracted using organic solvents like hydrocarbons or alcohols, which are flammable or toxic, or supercritical carbon dioxide, a safer alternative. Isolated components are separated using wiped film vacuum distillation or other distillation techniques.

==== Emergence of derived psychoactive cannabis products ====
The Agriculture Improvement Act of 2018 allows hemp-derived products with ≤0.3% Δ^{9}-THC to be sold legally in the US, leading to widespread availability of cannabinoids like Δ^{8}-THC, Δ^{10}-THC, HHC, and THCP. These compounds lack the extensive research of Δ^{9}-THC, posing potential risks and challenges for drug testing due to novel metabolites and high potency (e.g., THCP's 33× binding affinity). A 2023 paper proposed the term "derived psychoactive cannabis products" to distinguish these substances.

== Endocannabinoids ==
Anandamide, an endogenous ligand of CB_{1} and CB_{2}

Endocannabinoids are substances produced within the body that activate cannabinoid receptors. After the discovery of the first cannabinoid receptor in 1988, researchers identified endogenous ligands.

=== Types of endocannabinoid ligands ===
==== Arachidonoylethanolamine (Anandamide or AEA) ====
Anandamide, derived from arachidonic acid, is a partial agonist at CB_{1} and CB_{2} receptors, with potency similar to THC at CB_{1}. Found in nearly all tissues and plants like chocolate, it also acts on vanilloid receptors.

==== 2-Arachidonoylglycerol (2-AG) ====
2-AG, a full agonist at CB_{1} and CB_{2}, is present at higher brain concentrations than anandamide, potentially playing a larger role in endocannabinoid signaling.

==== Other endocannabinoids ====
Other endocannabinoids include noladin ether, NADA, OAE, and LPI, each with varying receptor affinities and effects.

=== Function ===
Endocannabinoids act as lipid messengers, released from one cell to activate cannabinoid receptors on nearby cells. Unlike monoamine neurotransmitters, they are lipophilic, insoluble in water, and synthesized on-demand rather than stored. They act locally due to their hydrophobic nature, unlike hormones. The endocannabinoid 2-AG is found in bovine and human maternal milk. Cannabinoids enhance sweet taste by increasing Tlc1 receptor expression and suppressing leptin, impacting energy homeostasis.

==== Retrograde signal ====
Endocannabinoids are retrograde transmitters, released from postsynaptic cells to act on presynaptic cells, reducing conventional neurotransmitter release (e.g., GABA or glutamate).

==== "Runner's high" ====
Some studies suggest that the runner's high should be attributed to endocannabinoids rather than to endorphins.

== Synthetic cannabinoids ==
Synthetic cannabinoids, historically based on herbal cannabinoids, have been developed since the 1940s. Modern compounds may not resemble natural cannabinoids but are designed to interact with cannabinoid receptors. They are used to study structure-activity relationships but pose health risks when used recreationally. Examples include dronabinol, nabilone, and rimonabant.

== See also ==
- List of cannabinoids
- List of hallucinogens
- Cancer and nausea § Cannabinoid
- Cannabinoid receptor antagonist
- Endocannabinoid enhancer
- Endocannabinoid reuptake inhibitor
