= Glossary of cannabis terms =

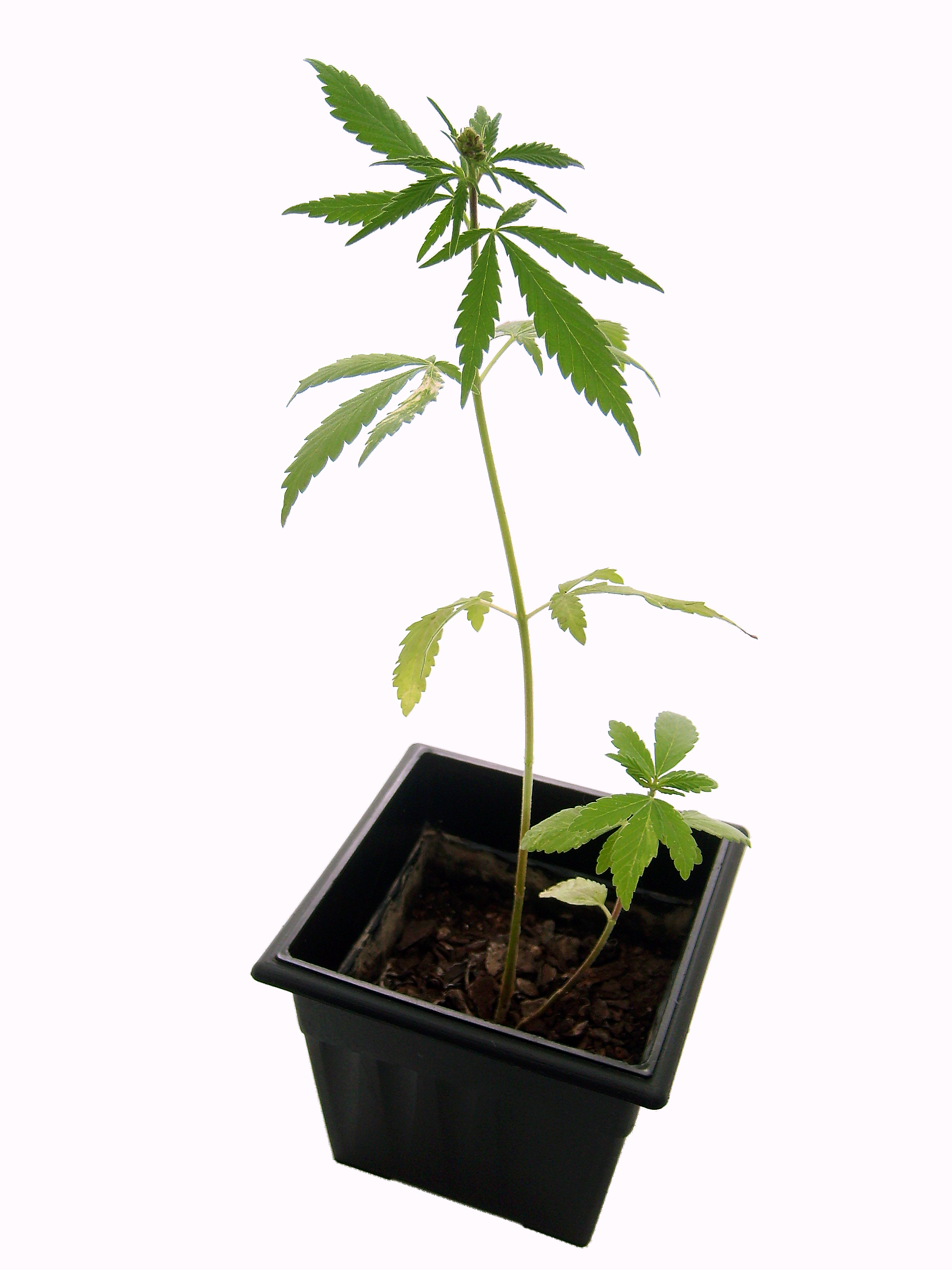
A cannabis plant

Terms related to cannabis include:

== 0–9 ==
2 long
Slang name for a cannabis cigarette. [See joint.]
420
Slang term for the consumption of cannabis
710
A slang name for hash oil, the word OIL flipped upside-down. [See cannabis edibles and extracts.]

== A ==
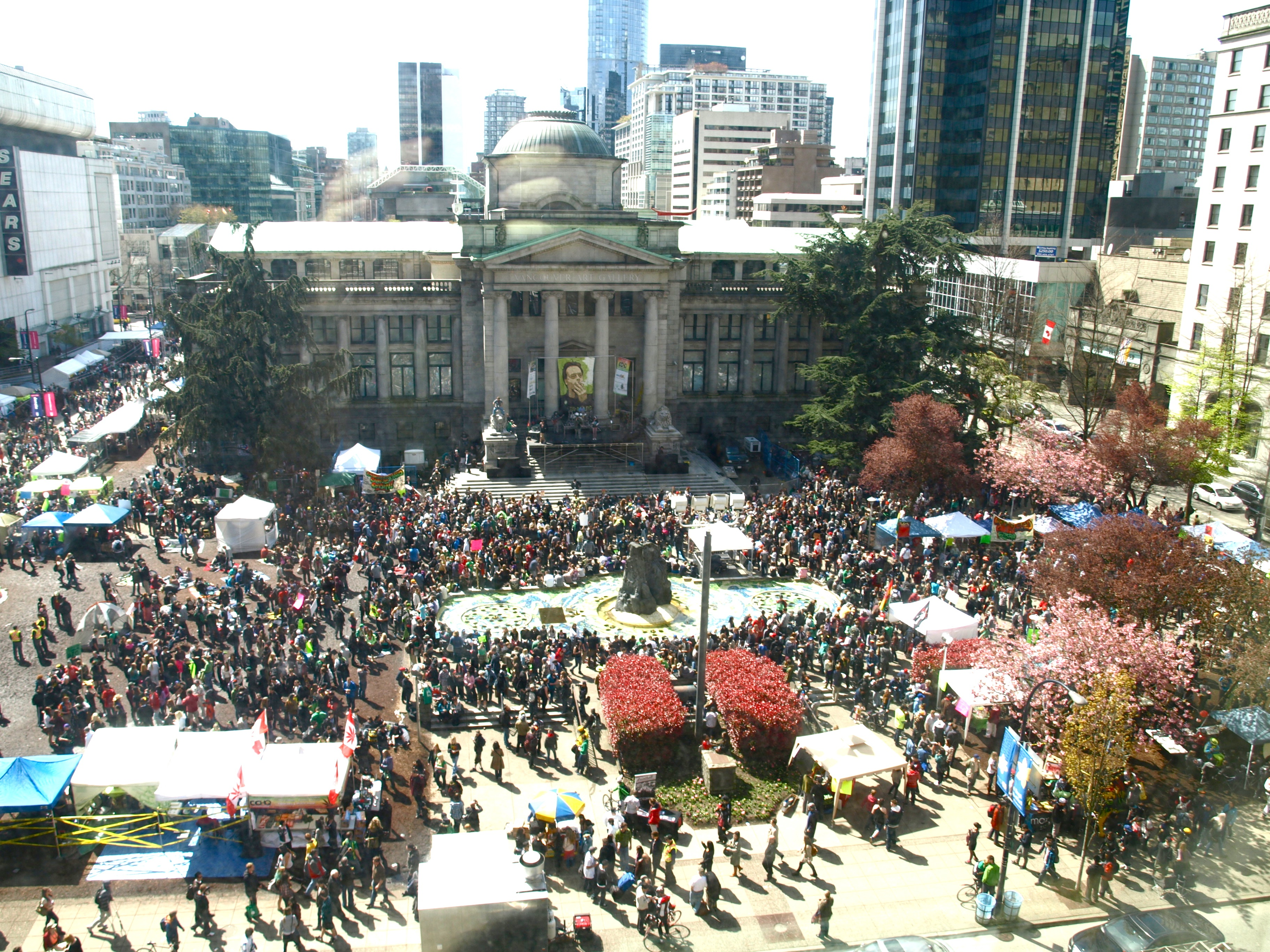
April 20 in Vancouver, British Columbia, in 2012

Acapulco Gold
An heirloom variety of cannabis originally grown in the mountains of western Mexico. [See cannabis strains.]
adult use
Any use of cannabis by adults, whether for medicine, pleasure, religious purposes, or otherwise. Incorporated in some legislation such as the California Adult Use of Marijuana Act.
agent provocateur
A person who, out of their own sense of duty or employed by the police, commits or provokes others to commit illegal or inappropriate activity, or falsely implicates them in a criminal act. [See informant.]
alcohol prohibition
Laws in some jurisdictions banning the production or sales of beverage alcohol in an attempt to prevent its use. These bans have been criticized because they create a black market, leading to corruption and violence. Nationwide, constitutional prohibition in the United States, established by the 18th Amendment in 1920, ended in 1933, repealed by the 21st Amendment.
Alice B. Toklas
1. Alice B. Toklas (1877–1967) was author of an autobiographical book, The Alice B. Toklas Cookbook, first published in 1954, which includes a recipe for "Hashish Fudge".
2. A slang name for a cannabis edible.
amotivational syndrome
A supposed medical syndrome of lack of motivation in cannabis consumers, which has been challenged.
anti-cannabis organizations
Groups fighting against cannabis legalization, or apologizing for harm caused by drug prohibition, including: D.A.R.E., Partnership at Drugfree.org, and SAM. [See prohibition.]
anti-cannabis propaganda
Material prepared by governments, organizations, or the media, that is not objective or uses loaded language to demonize cannabis or cannabis consumers. Early anti-cannabis propaganda includes the 1936 drug exploitation film Reefer Madness. The 1980s media public service announcement This Is Your Brain on Drugs is an example of anti-marijuana propaganda.
April 20
International day for cannabis pride.
Assassin of Youth
1937 American anti-marijuana propaganda film that depicts cannabis use leading to tragedies, and obscene, all-night parties. The film's title is from a 1937 article by U.S. "drug czar" Harry J. Anslinger. [See prohibition.]

== B ==
bag
A package of marijuana.
Battle of Maple Tree Square
Police riot against a peaceful Yippie smoke-in demonstration in Vancouver, British Columbia, in 1971. [See Gastown riots.]
BC
An industry strain cultivated in British Columbia, first called Red Hair Sensi, a hybridization of Panama Red/Acapulco Gold.
beatnik
1950s cannabis subculture, also called the Beat Generation. [See cannabis culture.]
bhang
A traditional edible preparation of cannabis, a drink. [See cannabis edibles and extracts.]
black market
Underground economy of illegal cannabis trade created by prohibition. The world illicit cannabis economy is estimated to be $141 billion annually, but the estimate might be low due to the clandestine nature of the trade.
Blue Dream
A sativa-dominant, hybrid variety of cannabis also called Blueberry Haze because it is a cross between Blueberry and Haze varieties, with Afghani, Mexican, and Thai ancestry. [See cannabis strains.]
blaze
Action of smoking cannabis to reach euphoric/hazy feeling.
blazed
Result of smoking cannabis with high THC level.
blunt
A cigar filled with cannabis often mixed with tobacco.
bong
A water filter for smoking cannabis. [See drug paraphernalia.]
Boston Freedom Rally
Annual cannabis rights demonstration held in Boston since 1989.
bowl
1. The part of a pipe or bong that holds the cannabis.
2. A slang name for a cannabis smoking pipe. [See drug paraphernalia.]
Brownie Mary
In California, before medical marijuana was legalized by voters in 1996, Mary Jane "Brownie Mary" Rathbun (1922–1999) who was arrested three times for baking cannabis brownies using her Social Security to buy ingredients and cannabis that was donated, giving them away free to AIDS and cancer patients, was able to successfully defend herself in court, arguing that medical necessity outweighed the reprehensibleness of her actions.
bud
The part of a cannabis plant that is consumed for its psychoactive properties.
budder
Industry trade name for a concentrated paste extracted from cannabis. [See cannabis edibles and extracts.]
budtender
A point of sale employee of a cannabis retail dispensary.
buzz
Slang name for a pleasant euphoric effect of cannabis.
bud
slang term for a cannabis inflorescence (i.e., marijuana)
blow
slang term for smoking marijuana
blowed
slang term for being under the influence of marijuana

== C ==
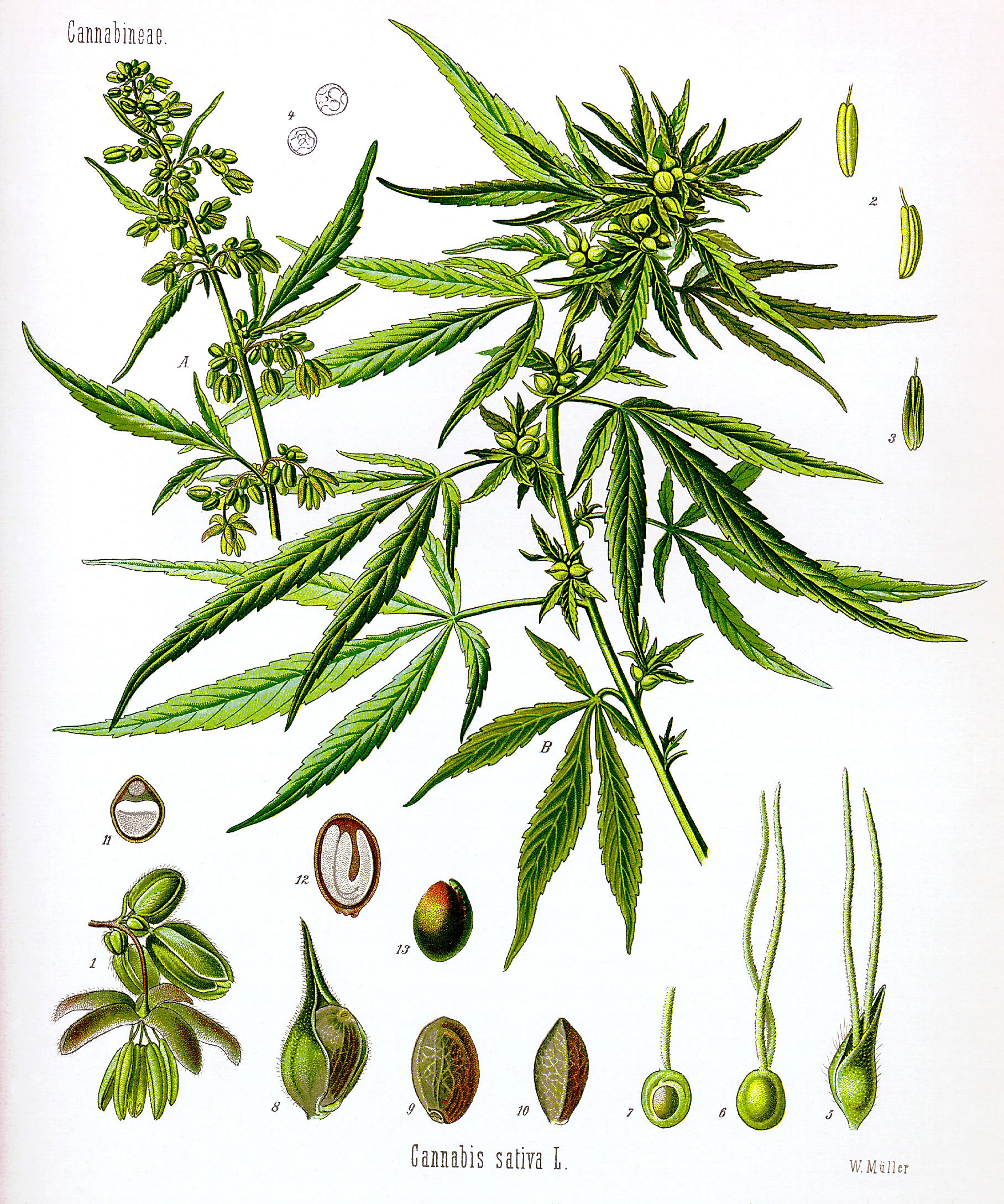
Cannabis sativa L.

cannabidiol
A non-psychotropic chemical compound found in cannabis, abbreviated CBD. [See cannabinoids.]
cannabinoid receptors
Parts of the endocannabinoid system located in cells throughout the body that are activated by cannabinoids, influencing appetite, pain-sensation, mood, and memory. Two types of cannabinoid receptors have been discovered, including cannabinoid receptor type 1 and cannabinoid receptor type 2.
cannabinoids
A class of chemical compounds, with various effects, isolated from cannabis. At least 113 different natural cannabinoids have been identified, including:
- cannabidiol (CBD)
- cannabinol (CBN)
- tetrahydrocannabinol (THC)
cannabinol
A mildly psychoactive substance found in cannabis, abbreviated CBN. [See cannabinoids.]
Cannabis
Latin, or scientific name for the entire plant hemp, legally named marijuana, marihuana, ganja or Indian hemp in some jurisdictions. There are many other names for cannabis, including commonly used terms grass, weed, and ganja. Three recognized sub-species include:
- Cannabis indica
- Cannabis ruderalis
- Cannabis sativa
cannabis and spirituality
Entheogenic and religious use of cannabis, including Rastafari and branches of Modern Paganism.
cannabis concentrate
Concentrated active portions of cannabis. [See cannabis edibles and extracts.]
cannabis consumption
Ways cannabis is consumed to experience psychoactive or therapeutic properties, including:
- cannabis foods
- lotions
- oral tinctures
- smoking
- vaporizing
cannabis culture
A social atmosphere and fellowship associated with consumption of cannabis or hemp products, including:
- beatnik
- cannabis consumption
- cannabis smoking
- flower child
- hippie
- hipster (1940s subculture)
- hipster (contemporary subculture)
- psychonautics
- recreational drug use
- responsible drug use
Cannabis Culture
Monthly Canadian online cannabis rights magazine originally called The Marijuana & Hemp Newsletter founded by Marc Emery, published in print from 1994 to 2009.
Cannabis Cup
Annual cannabis festival originally held in Amsterdam, now held in several cities, including awards for the year's best new cannabis strains in a variety of categories, and the Counterculture Hall of Fame and High Times Freedom Fighter of the Year awards for activism or leadership in the field of marijuana law reform.
cannabis (drug)
Cannabis used as a drug for medical or personal reasons, marijuana, marihuana, ganja or Indian hemp in some jurisdictions.
cannabis edibles and extracts
Psychoactive products made from cannabis, including:
- bhang
- butter (cannabutter)
- cannabis tea
- charas
- concentrates
  - honey oil
  - live resin
  - rosin
  - shatter
  - wax
- hash oil
- hashish
- kief
- tincture of cannabis
cannabis flower essential oil
A therapeutic product with little or no psychoactive properties extracted from cannabis leaves and flowers. [See cannabis industrial and home products.]
Cannabis indica
Latin, or scientific name for the plant species Cannabis indica, distinguished by its broad leaves and relatively short, densely branched stalk. [See cannabis.]

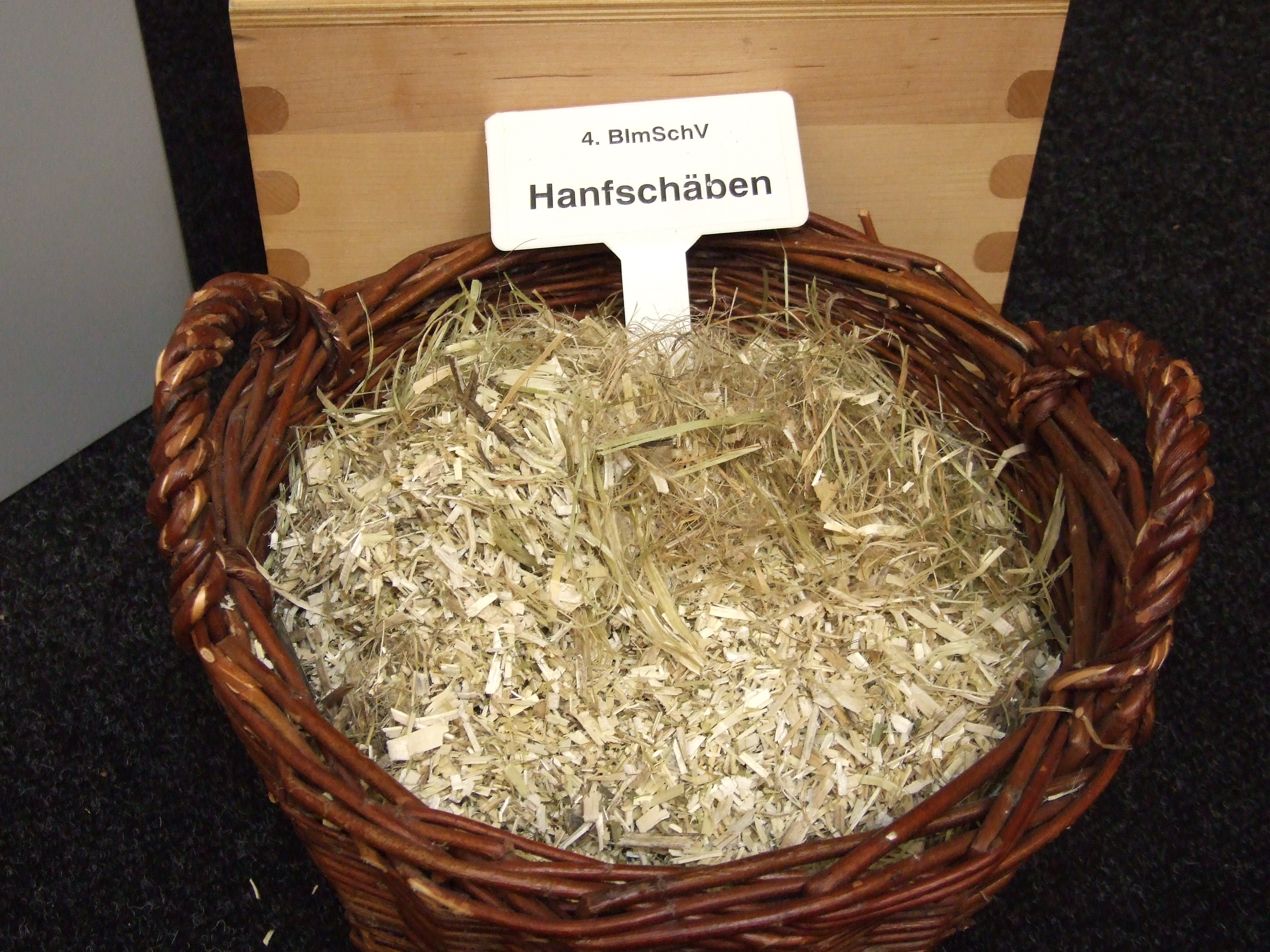
A non-psychoactive cannabis product, hemp hurds

cannabis industrial and home products
Non-psychoactive industrial hemp products, including:
- cannabis flower essential oil
- canvas
- hempcrete
- hemp hurds
- hemp jewelry
- hemp juice
- hemp milk
- hemp protein
- hemp seed oil
cannabis political parties
Organizations working to end prohibition by involvement in elections. Cannabis party politicians are elected officeholders in New South Wales, Victoria, and Western Australia. Marijuana party candidates have been influential driving progress of world cannabis law reform. Active cannabis parties include:
- Ale Yarok (Israel)
- Aotearoa Legalise Cannabis (New Zealand)
- Dagga Party (South Africa)
- Grassroots—Legalize Cannabis (Minnesota)
- Legalise Cannabis Australia, formerly H.E.M.P. Party
- Legal Marijuana Now (United States)
  - Minnesota Legal Marijuana Now!
  - Nebraska Legal Marijuana NOW
  - New Jersey Legalize Marijuana Party
  - U.S. Marijuana Party (Vermont)
cannabis prohibition
Laws in some jurisdictions banning the cultivation or sales of cannabis in an attempt to prevent its use. These bans are criticized because they create a black market and because enforcement is disproportionate in communities of color.
cannabis refugee
A term, primarily used in the United States and Canada, referring to people who have moved from one location to another due to cannabis prohibition laws, motivated by a desire to have legal access to cannabis to treat medical conditions for themselves or their family, or to legally consume cannabis for any other reason.
cannabis rights
Rights of people who consume cannabis, including the right to be free from employment discrimination and housing discrimination, and in some jurisdictions, the right to religious freedom and the right to own guns.
cannabis rights leaders
Activists in the cannabis legalization movement, including business leaders and celebrities who advocate for ending cannabis prohibition.
cannabis rights organizations
Groups fighting for legalization, or advocating to reduce prohibition's harm to society, including: Drug Policy Alliance, Law Enforcement Action Partnership, Marijuana Policy Project, NORML, and Students for Sensible Drug Policy.
Cannabis ruderalis
Latin, or scientific name for the plant species Cannabis ruderalis, which is sparsely branched with narrow leaves, typically shorter, and autoflowering. [See cannabis.]
Cannabis sativa
Latin, or scientific name for the plant species Cannabis sativa, known for tall, sparsely branched stalks with long, narrow leaves. [See cannabis.]
cannabis slang
Cannabis has more than 1,200 slang names, including weed, a commonly used cannabis slang name. Additionally, there are many slang terms for consumption of cannabis, and describing the state of being under the influence of cannabis. [See cannabis culture.]

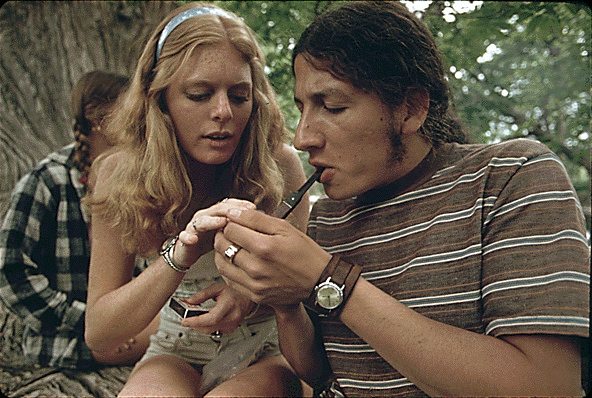
Young adults in Texas smoking cannabis in 1973

cannabis smoking
A method of consuming cannabis by inhalation of vapors released by burning cannabis or cannabis extracts. [See cannabis consumption.]
Cannabis strains
Pure or hybrid varieties of Cannabis sativa, Cannabis indica, and Cannabis ruderalis, including:
- Acapulco Gold
- Charlotte's Web
- Kush
- Sour Diesel
- White Widow
cannabis tea
An infusion of cannabis. [See cannabis edibles and extracts.]
cannabis (word)
The history of the plant name cannabis.
canvas
A heavy-duty fabric traditionally made of hemp. [See cannabis industrial and home products.]
CBD oil
Cannabidiol, a relatively non-psychoactive medical cannabis extract, similar to the Charlotte's Web strain developed for Dravet syndrome. [See cannabis edibles and extracts.]
chalice
A sacred Rastafari water pipe. [See drug paraphernalia.]
chanvre
French name for cannabis.
charas
A traditional form of Indian hashish. [See cannabis edibles and extracts.]
Charlotte's Web
A high-CBD, low-THC, relatively non-psychoactive medical cannabis extract, developed in Colorado, named after Dravet syndrome patient Charlotte Figi. The name Charlotte's Web is banned in Oregon for its association with a children's book of that title. [See cannabis strains.]
Cheech & Chong
Comedy team of Cheech Marin and Tommy Chong, creators of the groundbreaking 1978 stoner film Up in Smoke.
cherry
Slang word for a burning ember at the tip of a joint or in a pipe bowl.
chillum
A traditional clay pipe for smoking cannabis. [See drug paraphernalia.]
chronic
A slang name for high quality cannabis.
Church of Cognizance
An Arizona cannabis church founded in 1991. [See cannabis and religion.]
Church of the Universe
An Ontario, Canada cannabis church founded in 1969. [See cannabis and religion.]
co-dependence
Psychological condition of dysfunctional attempts to control another person's behavior. [See prohibition.]

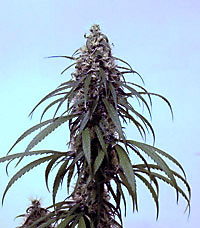
A cola

cola
Topmost flower bud on a cannabis plant.
Compassionate Investigational New Drug program
After Robert Randall became the first person to successfully use a medical necessity defense when he was charged with illegal possession of cannabis to treat his glaucoma, he filed a federal lawsuit, Randall v. United States, in 1976, resulting in the federal Compassionate Investigational New Drug program being established, under President Jimmy Carter, in 1978. At the program's peak, fifteen patients received cannabis. 43 people were approved for the program, however 28 of the patients whose doctors completed the necessary paperwork never received any cannabis and, under the Bush administration, the program stopped accepting new patients in 1992.
concentrates
Products including budder, honey oil, live resin, shatter, taffy, wax, commercially extracted from cannabis with supercritical carbon dioxide (CO_{2}) or hydrocarbon solvents. [See cannabis edibles and extracts.]
connoisseur
A particular marijuana enthusiast. [See cannabis culture.]
Conversion of CBD to THC
Conversion of cannabidiol (CBD) to tetrahydrocannabinol (THC) can occur through a ring-closing reaction. This cyclization can be acid-catalyzed or brought about by heating.
Controlled Substances Act
U.S. federal law enacted by President Richard Nixon in 1970 to replace Harry Anslinger's 1937 Marihuana Tax Act that was ruled unconstitutional by the Supreme Court. The Controlled Substances Act created a list of five Schedules, and placed cannabis alongside codeine and heroin in Schedule I, the most restrictive classification. [See prohibition.]
cottonmouth
Slang name for a dry mouth caused by smoking or vaporizing cannabis or cannabis extracts. [See effects of cannabis.]

== D ==
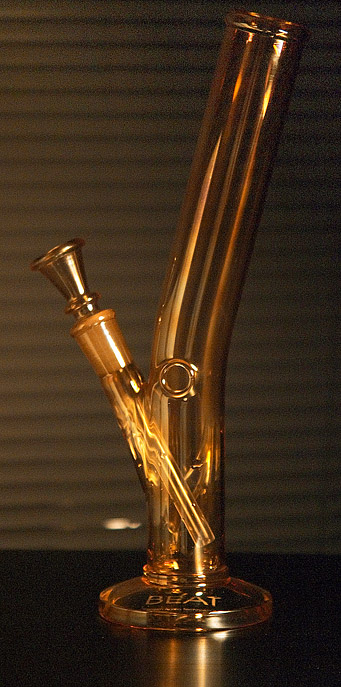
Drug paraphernalia: A glass bong

dab
Slang name for hash oil, a resin extracted from cannabis. [See cannabis edibles and extracts.]
dabbing
A slang term for smoking or vape-ing hash oil, or "dabs", extracted from cannabis. [See cannabis consumption.]
dab rig
Water pipe device for vaporizing hash oil. [See drug paraphernalia.]
dagga
Afrikaans word for cannabis, derived from the Khoikhoi dachab.
dank
A slang word for high quality cannabis.
D.A.R.E.
US and UK government anti-freedom indoctrination program aimed at elementary school fourth through sixth-graders, instituted by LAPD chief Daryl Gates in 1983. The Drug Abuse Resistance Education program is costly, and is criticized for pushing out science-based health education. Other criticisms of the program include its ineffectiveness, and its training of children to be police informants. [See anti-cannabis organizations.]
DEA or Drug Enforcement Administration
U.S. federal agency formed in 1970 by the establishment of President Richard Nixon's Controlled Substances Act. The organization is criticized for being unaccountable to any authority, and for self-serving acts including blocking the removal of cannabis from Schedule I. [See prohibition.]
decriminalization
The lessening of criminal penalties in relation to consumption of cannabis, reflecting changing social and moral views. [See reform.]
ditch weed or ditchweed
1. Slang term describing feral cannabis.
2. A slang name for poor-quality marijuana.
doobie
A slang word for cannabis cigarette. [See joint.]
dronabinol
International nonproprietary name (generic name) for ∆9-tetrahydrocannabinol (THC) whether natural or synthetic. (The term is sometimes interpreted by mistake as referring only to synthetically-manufactured THC).
drug czar or Drug Czar
A person put in charge of drug policy for some region, usually at a national level (US or UK).
drug paraphernalia
Equipment or accessories used for growing, processing, consuming, or concealing cannabis or cannabis extracts, including:
- bong
- bowl
- chalice
- chillum
- herb grinder
- hookah
- oil rig
- one-hitter
- roach clip
- rolling paper
- stash box
- vaporizer
drug prohibition
Laws in some jurisdictions banning the cultivation or sales of plants including cannabis, opium poppy, and psilocybin mushrooms in an attempt to prevent their use. These bans are criticized because they create a black market and because enforcement is disproportionate in communities of color.
drug war
Term referring to wars fought over control of drug commerce, including the 19th century Opium Wars, and contemporary police and military operations including the Mexican drug war, the Philippine drug war, and the US war on drugs.

== E ==
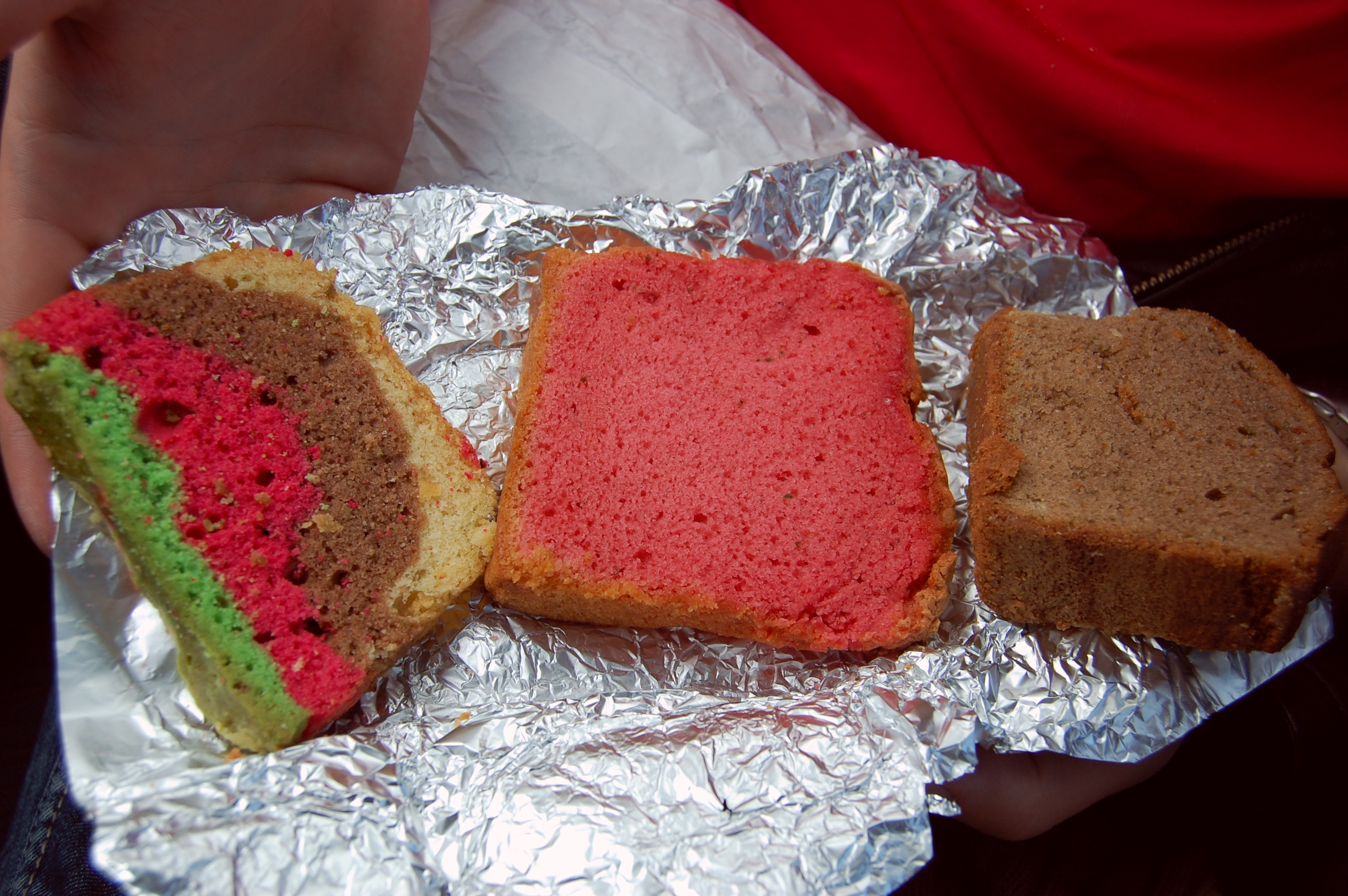
Edibles: An assortment of space cakes

edible
A food or drink containing cannabis.
effects of cannabis
Consumption of cannabis has various psychological and physiological effects that can include euphoria and anxiety. Other effects of cannabis include munchies.
Emperor Wears No Clothes
1985 book by cannabis rights pioneer Jack Herer, The Emperor Wears No Clothes: Hemp & The Marijuana Conspiracy, that argues cannabis is a renewable source of fuel, food, fiber, construction material, and medicine, and that it can be grown virtually anywhere, citing data and historical records.
endocannabinoid system
A group of receptors for cannabinoids in the brain and nervous system.
ent
Contemporary slang name for a cannabis consumer, from the living trees in The Lord of the Rings.
entheogen
Any psychoactive plant or compound that induces a spiritual experience and is aimed at personal spiritual development, including cannabis, peyote, and psilocybin mushrooms. [See religion and drugs.]
enthusiast
A person who consumes cannabis. [See cannabis culture.]
entrapment
Deceptive and unethical law enforcement activity by an officer planning an offense and inducing a person to commit a crime through fraud or persuasion, commonly practiced in the United States and banned in Sweden. [See informant.]
Ethiopian Zion Coptic Church
A Florida Rastafari church founded by Thomas Reilly (Brother Louv) in 1975. [See cannabis and religion.]
Etymology of cannabis
The history of the plant name cannabis.
exploitation film
Drug exploitation films include the well known Reefer Madness.
extract
1. Product made from cannabis resin. [See cannabis edibles and extracts.]
2. Process of making edible products or concentrates from cannabis.

== F ==
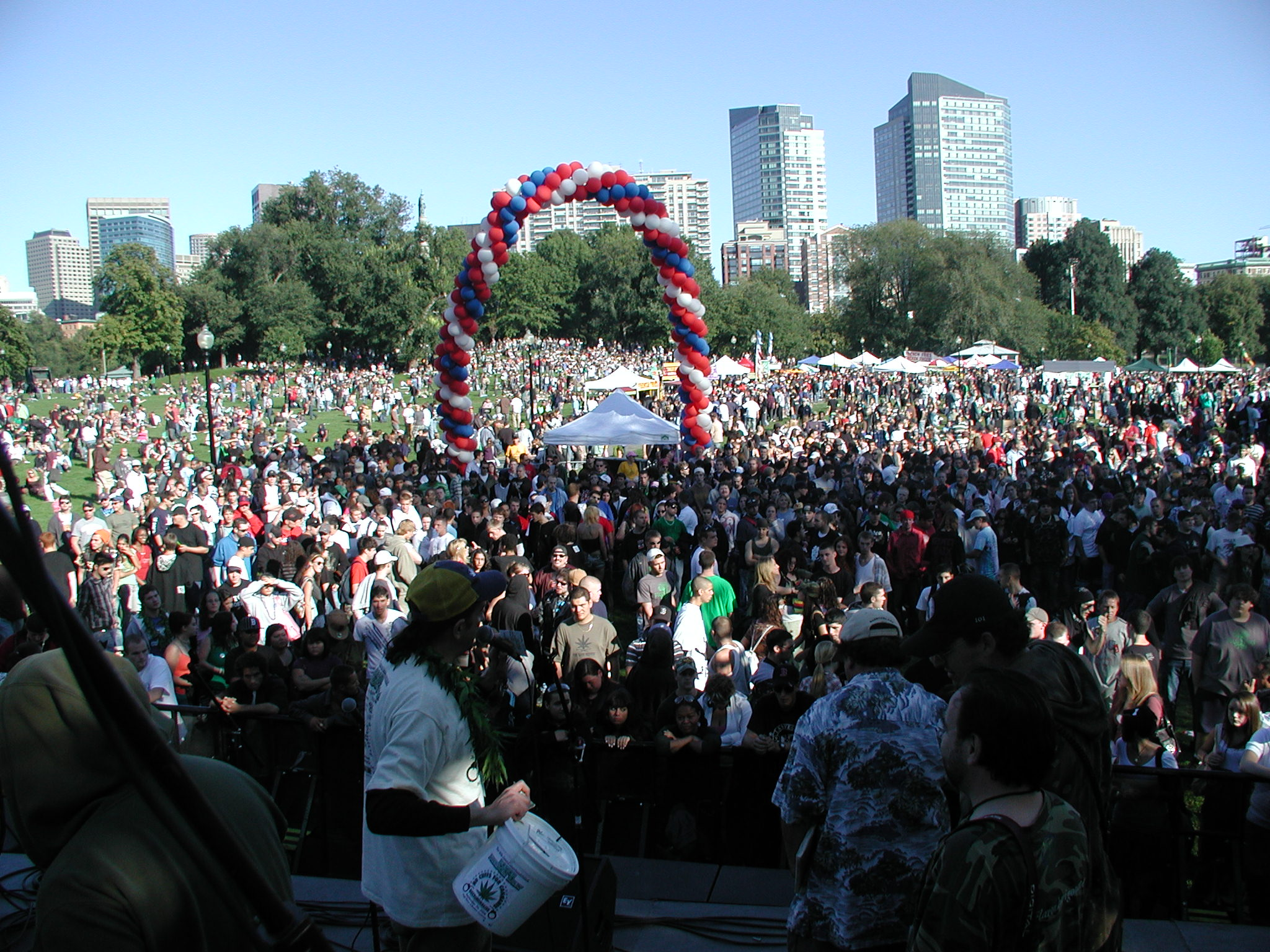
2008 Freedom Rally in Boston

feral hemp
Wild-growing cannabis generally descended from hemp plants previously cultivated for fiber. Referred to as ditch weed, with little or no psychoactive properties, cannabis is exceptionally hardy, found widely across Indiana, Iowa, Minnesota, Missouri, Nebraska, and Oklahoma.
First Church of Cannabis
An Indiana cannabis church founded in 2015. [See cannabis and religion.]
flower
The part of a cannabis plant that is consumed for its therapeutic qualities.
flower child
A hippie. [See cannabis culture.]
freedom fighter
A cannabis rights activist.
Freedom Rally
1. Cannabis pride demonstration held annually in Boston since 1989. [See Boston Freedom Rally.]
2. 1971 rally and music festival in Michigan protesting the arrest for marijuana possession, and imprisonment of poet John Sinclair. [See John Sinclair Freedom Rally.]
Free John Sinclair rally
See John Sinclair Freedom Rally.

== G ==
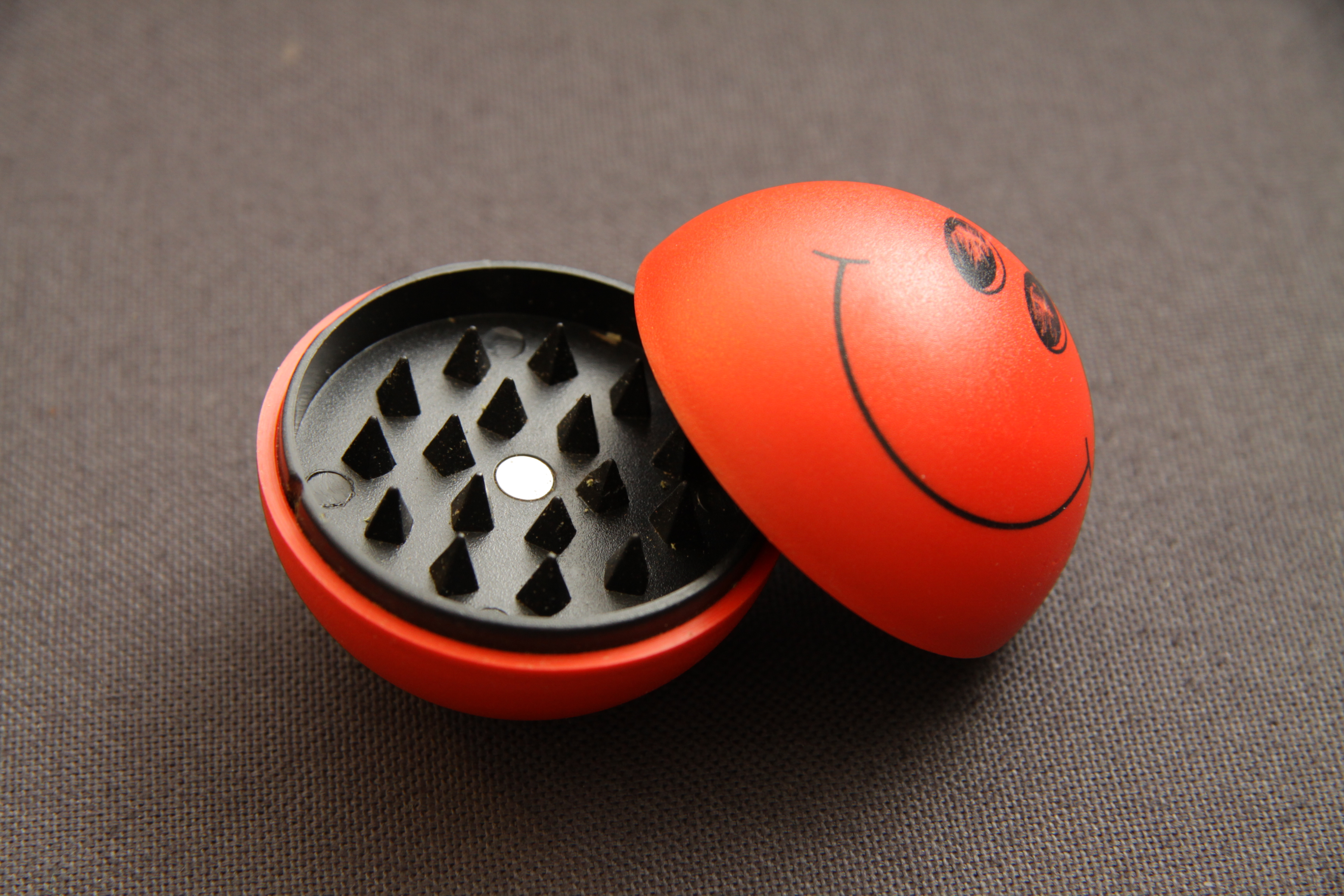
A grinder

ganja
Hindi word for cannabis.
Gastown riots
1971 Vancouver, British Columbia, incident also known as "The Battle of Maple Tree Square", described by a commission of inquiry as a police riot, during which police attacked a peaceful Yippie smoke-in protesting a series of special operation marijuana arrests. Police used horse-back charges on crowds of onlookers and tourists, and were accused of tactics including indiscriminate beatings with riot batons. The event is commemorated in a two-story-high 2009 photo mural by Stan Douglas.
gateway drug
Disproved theory that cannabis use leads to use of potentially-deadly, dependence-forming substances such as alcohol and barbiturates, or heroin.
gift economy
A means of exchanging cannabis for non-monetary gain, in jurisdictions where its possession is legal but its sale is not legal
glass
A name describing specialty art-glass cannabis pipes and bongs. [See drug paraphernalia.]
Global Marijuana March
Annual cannabis rights rally begun in 1999, held in more than 829 cities across 72 countries on the first Saturday in May.
Gorilla Glue
Several hybrid cannabis strains, Gorilla Glue Number One, Gorilla Glue Number Two, etcetera, bred from indica varieties. [See cannabis strains.]
grass
A slang word for cannabis.
Great Midwest Marijuana Harvest Festival
The original Yippie smoke-in, first held in 1971 to protest the arrest of Dana Beal on marijuana charges, now the longest running annual cannabis rights "protestival", Marijuana Harvestfest, or Madison Hempfest, as it is also known, was organized by Ben Masel until his death in 2011. The multi-day event has an estimated attendance of 4,000 people each year.
green closet
A state of fear for some people secretly using cannabis (also "coming out of the green closet").
green fairy
A New Zealand term for a person who provides cannabis or cannabis-based products intended for medicinal use, irrespective of the law and typically for altruistic reasons.
grinder
Apparatus for grinding cannabis before use. [See drug paraphernalia.]

== H ==
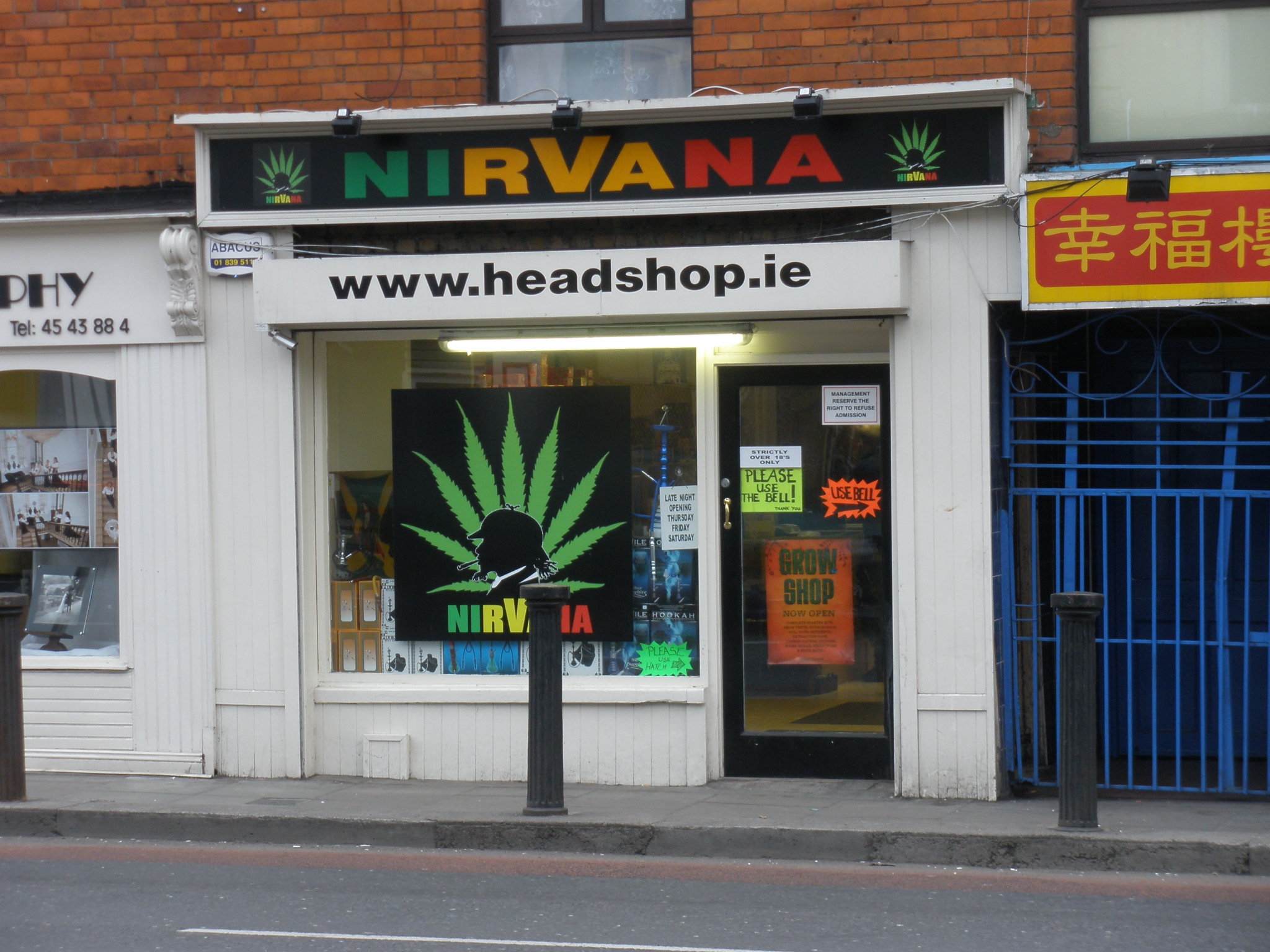
The Nirvana head shop in Dublin, Ireland

hanf
German word for cannabis.
Hanfparade
Annual cannabis rights demonstration held in Berlin since 1997.
Harry Anslinger
The head of the U.S. Bureau of Prohibition when alcohol prohibition was repealed in 1933, Harry J. Anslinger (1892–1975) was the founding commissioner of the Federal Bureau of Narcotics which is credited for the 1937 Marihuana Tax Act criminalizing cannabis. The Marihuana Tax Act was ruled unconstitutional by the U.S. Supreme Court in 1969, but was replaced with the Controlled Substances Act. [See prohibition.]
Harvestfest
See Great Midwest Marijuana Harvest Festival.
hash
Shortened name for hashish. [See cannabis edibles and extracts.]
Hash Bash
Held in Ann Arbor, Michigan, annually since 1972, following the John Sinclair Freedom Rally held a few months earlier there, in 1971, the Hash Bash cannabis pride protest-festival is one of the original Yippie smoke-ins. The event has an estimated attendance of more than 5,000 people each year.
hashish
An extracted cannabis product made from resin. [See cannabis edibles and extracts.]
hash oil
A resin extracted from cannabis or hashish. [See cannabis edibles and extracts.]
head
See pothead.
head shop
A retail outlet specializing in paraphernalia and items related to cannabis culture.
hemp
English, or common name for the entire plant cannabis, legally named marijuana or marihuana in some jurisdictions. Other names for hemp include:
- Cannabis indica
- Cannabis ruderalis
- Cannabis sativa
- feral cannabis
- ganja
- grass
- Mary Jane
- medical cannabis
- reefer
- trees
- weed

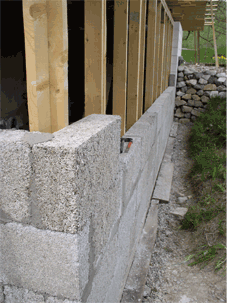
Hempcrete blocks

hempcrete
A bio-composite construction material made of hemp hurds. [See cannabis industrial and home products.]
hemperor or Hemperor
See Jack Herer.
Hempfest
Any of several annual cannabis pride demonstrations held in cities around the world, including Madison Hempfest, and Seattle Hempfest.
Hemp for Victory
14-minute 1942 U.S. Department of Agriculture film encouraging farmers to grow hemp for the WWII war effort because other industrial fibers were in short supply and often had to be imported from overseas.
hemp hurds
Hemp wood, the inner portion of the hemp stalk separated from the fiber. [See cannabis industrial and home products.]
hemp jewelry
Jewelry made from hemp cord, rope, or thread. [See cannabis industrial and home products.]
hemp juice
A non-psychoactive drink cold-pressed from cannabis leaves and flowers. [See cannabis industrial and home products.]
hemp milk
Plant milk made from cannabis seeds. [See cannabis industrial and home products.]
hemp oil
Oil extracted from cannabis seeds. [See cannabis industrial and home products.]
hemp protein
The protein content of hemp seeds. [See cannabis industrial and home products.]
herb
A word describing cannabis.
herb grinder
Device for grinding cannabis before use. [See drug paraphernalia.]
high
Slang name describing the state of being under the influence of cannabis. [See effects of cannabis.]
High Times
An American monthly cannabis rights magazine founded in 1974 for the Yippie Underground Press Syndicate by Tom Forçade, now with a circulation of 236,000 monthly subscribers.

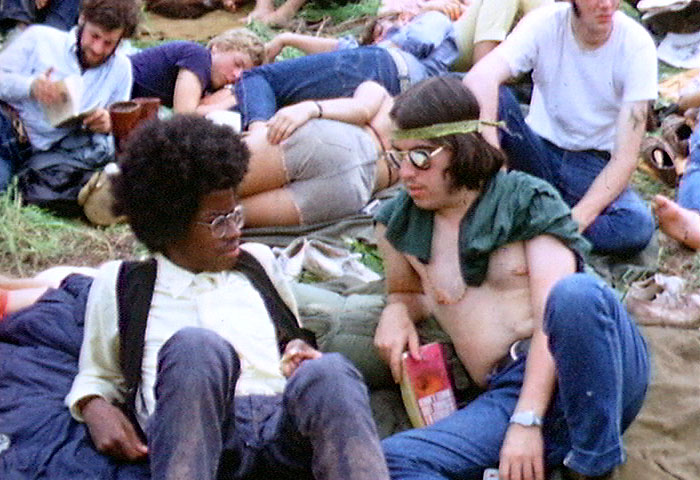
Two hippies at Woodstock in 1969

hippie
1960s cannabis subculture. [See cannabis culture.]
hipster
1940s or contemporary cannabis subculture. [See cannabis culture.]
- hipster (1940s subculture)
- hipster (contemporary subculture)
hit
Act of smoking, or vape-ing, a puff of cannabis or cannabis extract. [See cannabis consumption.]
home grown or homegrown
Cannabis that has been personally cultivated.
honey oil
A type of extracted cannabis concentrate. [See cannabis edibles and extracts.]
hookah
A traditional Indian water pipe, also called shisha in Arabic speaking locales and in Southeast Asia. [See drug paraphernalia.]
hophead
A user of cannabis
hot box
Slang term for smoking cannabis in a closed space. [See cannabis consumption.]
hydro
Slang name for hydroponic cannabis.
hydroponic
Cannabis that is grown in a nutrient solution, without soil.

== I ==
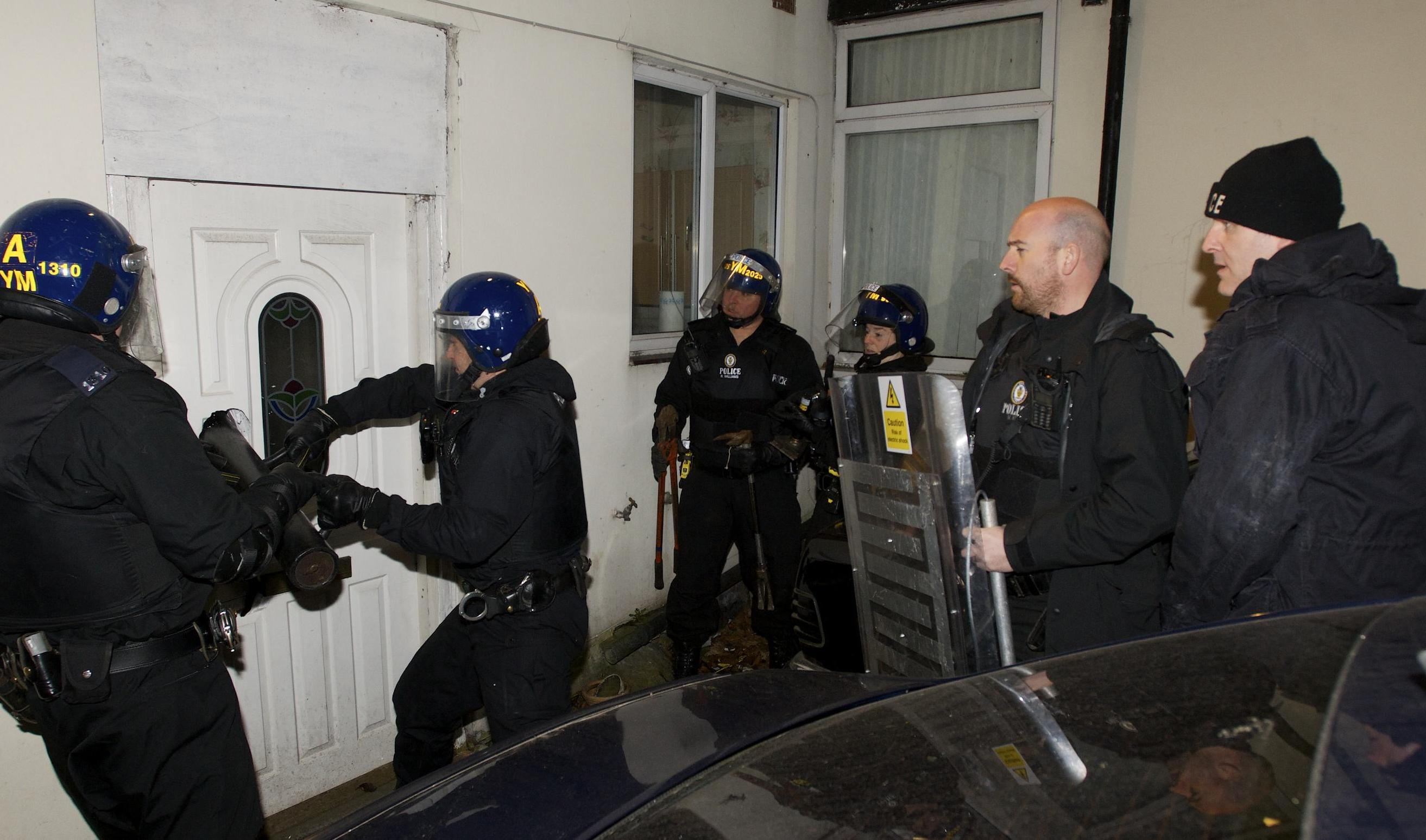
Following a tip from an informant, UK police conduct an early morning cannabis raid at a home in 2013.

Indian Hemp Drugs Commission
British and Indian government 3,281-page 1894 study of cannabis use in India that found there are no ill effects from moderate cannabis usage, and it may be beneficial medically. However the report concluded that excessive consumption is an indication of moral weakness or depravity.
indoctrination
Process of inculcating a person with ideas, attitudes, or cognitive strategies, distinguished from education on the basis that the indoctrinated person is expected not to question or critically examine the doctrine they have learned. [See anti-cannabis propaganda.]
industrial hemp
Cannabis cultivated to make products that are non-psychoactive.
informant
A word used to describe an undercover police informant, narcotics agent, or snitch.
initiative
Citizens' initiatives are a method, allowed in some jurisdictions, to put a law up for popular vote by getting petitions signed by a certain minimum number of registered voters. Popular initiatives are allowed in twenty-one U.S. states.
irie
Jamaican English term indicating peace of mind and well-being

== J ==
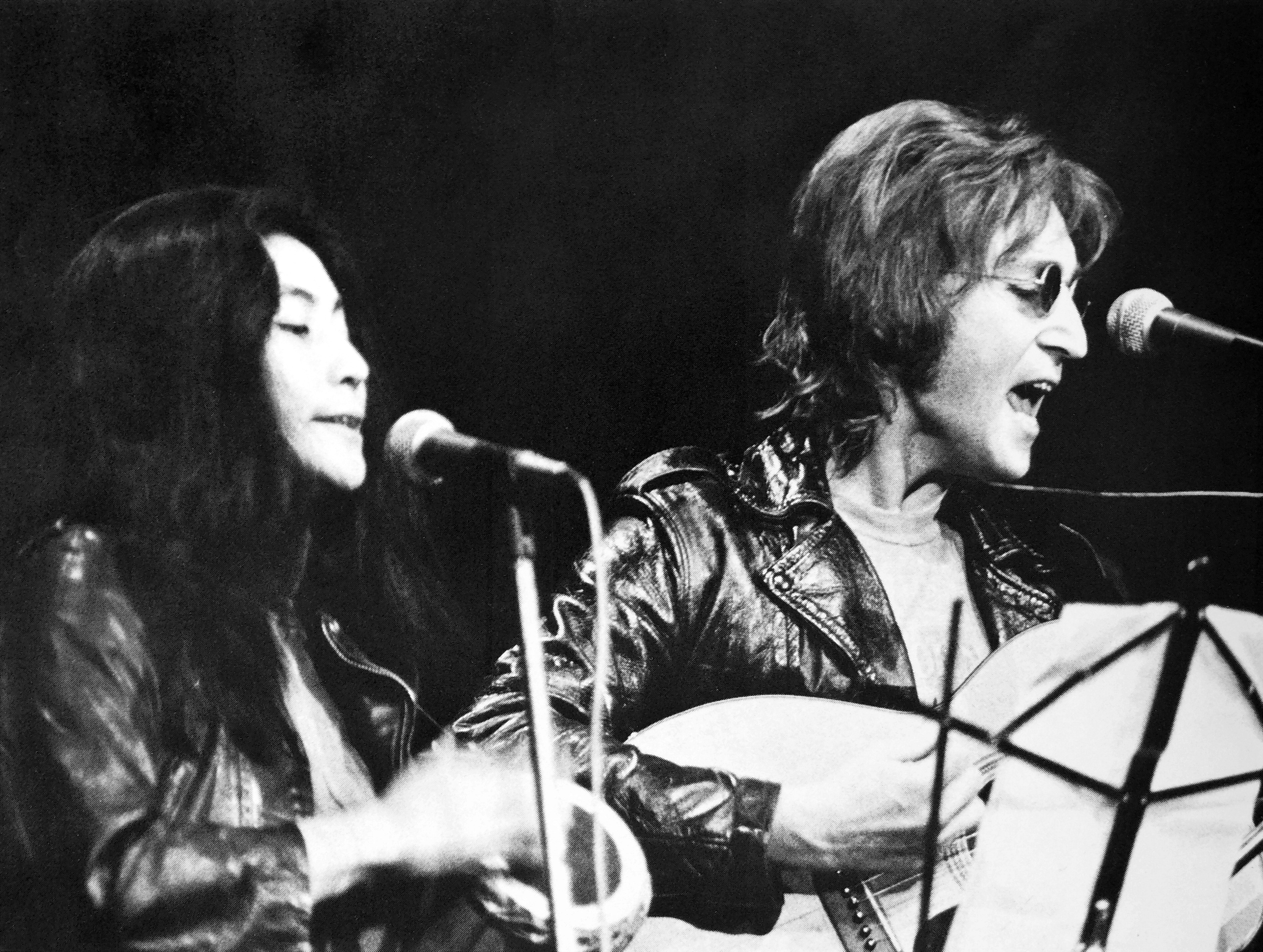
Yoko Ono and John Lennon at John Sinclair Freedom Rally

Jack Herer
1. Cannabis rights pioneer Jack Herer (1939–2010) who ran for U.S. President in 1988 and 1992, was author of The Emperor Wears No Clothes: Hemp & The Marijuana Conspiracy, first published in 1985.
2. A classic trade name for several medical cannabis strains.
jagged
Jazz-era term for being under the influence of alcohol, cannabis, or other drugs.
jay
Slang name for a joint.
John Sinclair Freedom Rally
1971 Ann Arbor, Michigan, rally and music festival protesting the 1969 arrest and imprisonment of poet John Sinclair. Among others, John Lennon, Bob Seger, and Stevie Wonder performed for the event. Sentenced to ten years in jail for two joints, Sinclair had been imprisoned for two years when he was released, three days after the rally.
joint
A cannabis cigarette.
jury nullification
The power of a trial jury to reach a not guilty verdict, regardless of evidence and judge's instructions, because of a disagreement with the law, including the belief that a law is unconstitutional or inhumane, or disapproval of the punishment.
Just Say No
1980s-era anti-cannabis advertising campaign orchestrated by First Lady Nancy Reagan as part of the U.S. war on drugs.
J-Walking
Walking in a public space with a cannabis cigarette (Joint).

== K ==
kief
A powder that is created by shaking the crystalized trichomes off cured cannabis flowers. [See extracts.]
kind
Word describing high-quality cannabis, or anything related to cannabis culture.
Kush
A subset of indica varieties of cannabis bred from descendants of strains originating in the Hindu Kush mountain range of Afghanistan, India, and Pakistan. [See cannabis strains.]

== L ==
La Guardia Committee
1944 New York Academy of Medicine report prepared for Mayor Fiorello LaGuardia's commission, appointed in 1939 to study the effects of marihuana use in the US, that concluded the publicity concerning the catastrophic effects of marihuana smoking is unfounded, marihuana is not the determining factor in the commission of major crimes, marihuana smoking is not widespread among school children, and the gateway drug theory is without foundation. The report was condemned by "drug czar" Harry Anslinger.
LEAP
Law Enforcement Action Partnership, formerly called Law Enforcement Against Prohibition, is an organization of retired police officers and law enforcement officials, formed in 2002, now with more than 180 speakers, representing 5,000 law enforcement members, and more than 100,000 supporters worldwide. [See cannabis rights organizations.]
Leary v. United States
1969 U.S. Supreme Court ruling that unanimously declared the Marihuana Tax Act of 1937 to be unconstitutional. Prohibition of cannabis continued under Nixon's 1970 Controlled Substances Act, which placed cannabis in Schedule I, prohibiting all uses.
legalization
The process of removing the legal prohibition against cannabis.
Legalize It
Song by Peter Tosh from an album of the same title, originally recorded in 1975, that was banned in Jamaica when it was released, and has since then become a cannabis culture anthem.
lid
A measured quantity of cannabis, usually 1 ounce (28 g).
live resin
Extracted fresh cannabis that is kept at freezing temperatures through the entire process, rather than dried. [See cannabis edibles and extracts.]

== M ==
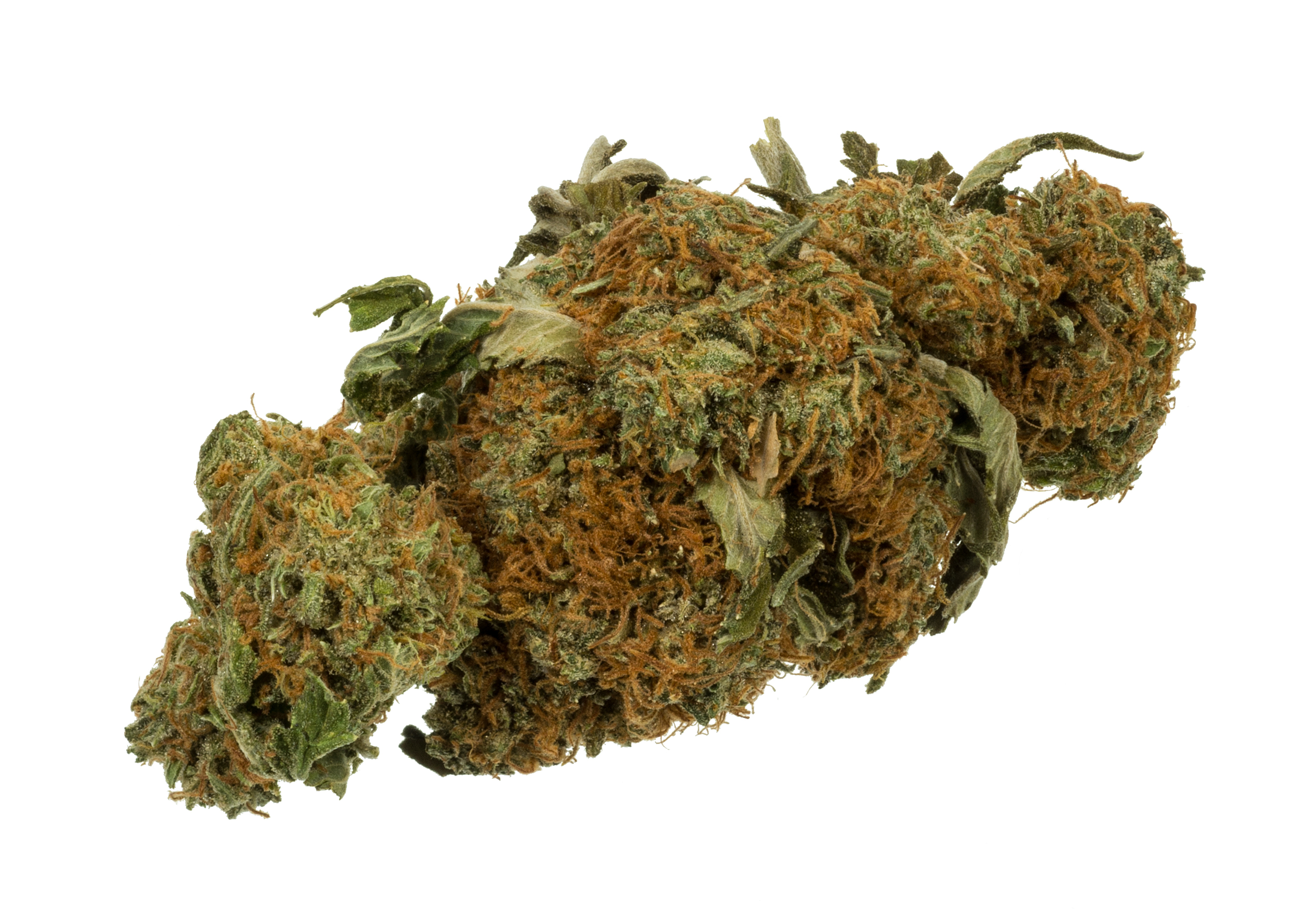
Dried marijuana, typical of what is sold for drug use

ma
Chinese name for cannabis.
Madison Hempfest
See Great Midwest Marijuana Harvest Festival.
magical brownie
A slang name for a cannabis edible.
magic mushroom
Any of 186 species of psilocybin fungi, or psychedelic mushrooms, banned in the United States under Schedule I of the Controlled Substances Act. Used since prehistoric times as an entheogen for spiritual experiences, some cultures have used psilocybin mushrooms in their religious rites and ceremonies. [See cannabis culture.]
mandatory minimum sentencing
Laws that require offenders serve a predefined term for certain crimes, criticized for resulting in harsh sentencing and cruel and unusual punishment.
marihuana or marijuana
A slang word for cannabis, the legal name in some jurisdictions.
Marihuana
1936 American anti-marijuana propaganda film that depicts alcoholic drinks and cannabis use leading to tragedies, including pregnancy, police shootouts, and a gateway to heroin use and a life of crime. [See prohibition.]
marijuana enthusiast
A person who consumes cannabis. [See cannabis culture.]
Marihuana Tax Act
1937 U.S. law that prohibited cannabis for the first time, and was ruled unconstitutional by the Supreme Court in 1969 and replaced with President Nixon's Controlled Substances Act. [See prohibition.]
marijuana prohibition
Laws in some jurisdictions banning the cultivation or sales of cannabis in an attempt to prevent its use. These bans are criticized because they create a black market and because enforcement is disproportionate in communities of color.
marijuana refugee
Term referring to people who have moved from one location to another due to cannabis prohibition laws, motivated by a desire to have legal access to cannabis to treat medical conditions for themselves or their family, or to legally consume cannabis for any other reason.
marijuana rights
The rights of people who consume cannabis include freedom of speech and freedom of religion, and the right to be free from employment and housing discrimination.
marijuana rights leaders
See freedom fighter.
Marinol
A synthetic cannabinoid, tetrahydrocannabinol (THC), also called dronabinol, produced by Insys Therapeutics and Solvay Pharmaceuticals, sold legally in the United States under Schedule III of the Controlled Substances Act, though natural THC is banned under Schedule I.
Mary Jane
A slang name for cannabis.
medical cannabis
Cannabis used as a drug for medical purposes, legally named marijuana or marihuana in some jurisdictions.
Million Marijuana March
See Global Marijuana March.

Moses Baca
Laborer caught by authorities in 1937 with one-quarter ounce (7 g) of cannabis, one of the first people convicted under the federal Marihuana Tax Act. United States "drug czar" Harry J. Anslinger visited Colorado in order to be present at Baca's sentencing. [See prohibition.]
mota
Spanish slang word meaning cannabis.
munchies
Increased appetite. [See effects of cannabis.]

== N ==
narc
A slang word for undercover narcotics agent. [See informant.]
New Jim Crow
A 2010 book by civil rights advocate Professor Michelle Alexander, The New Jim Crow: Mass Incarceration in the Age of Colorblindness, that argues the war on drugs has a devastating impact on inner city African American communities, on a scale entirely out of proportion to the actual dimensions of criminal activity taking place within these communities.
Nixon
1. U.S. President Richard Nixon, who in 1969 declared war on drugs. After the 1937 cannabis prohibition law was ruled unconstitutional by the U.S. Supreme Court, Nixon signed the Controlled Substances Act in 1970, which placed marijuana in Schedule I, alongside heroin. [See prohibition.]
2. A slang name for poor-quality, low-grade cannabis, or ditchweed that is misrepresented as being good-quality herb.
noble experiment
See alcohol prohibition in the United States, 1920–1933.
NORML
The National Organization for the Reform of Marijuana Laws, an American non-profit cannabis rights organization founded in 1970 by Keith Stroup with a grant from the Playboy Foundation.
nug
Slang name for a bud of high-quality cannabis.

== O ==
oil
Slang name for hash oil, a resin extracted from cannabis. [See cannabis edibles and extracts.]
oil rig
A water filter modified for vaporizing hash oil.
one-hitter
A pipe for smoking cannabis. [See drug paraphernalia.]
Operation Green Merchant
Reagan-era DEA investigation primarily targeting advertisers in High Times and Sinsemilla Tips magazines. [See prohibition.]
Operation Pipe Dreams
Code-name for a 2003 U.S. Drug Enforcement Administration investigation targeting businesses selling cannabis pipes and bongs. Hundreds of businesses and homes were raided during the operation. Fifty-five people were charged with trafficking of illegal drug paraphernalia, including actor Tommy Chong, who was sentenced to 9 months in federal prison for financing and promoting a glass shop. Operation Pipe Dreams was estimated to have cost more than $12 million. [See prohibition.]

== P ==
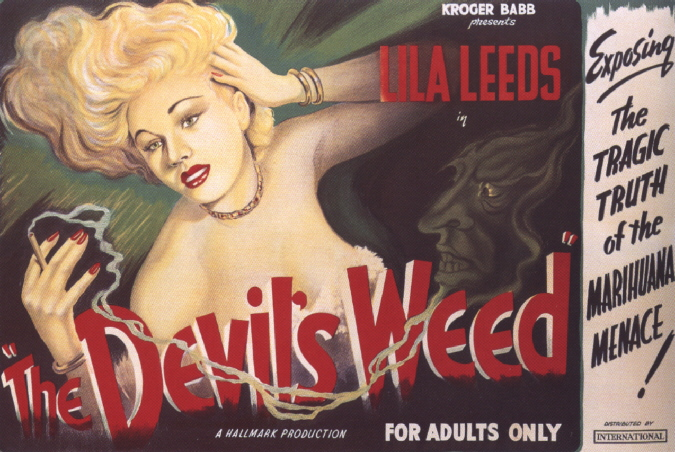
Example of anti-cannabis propaganda: Poster for the 1949 film She Shoulda Said No!

pakalolo
Hawaiian slang name for cannabis.
paraphernalia
1. Any material related to cannabis culture.
2. Equipment or accessories used for growing, consuming, or concealing cannabis. [See drug paraphernalia.]
paraquat
Herbicide that has been linked to the development of Parkinson's disease, banned in the European Union since 2007, used as part of North American and Central American anti-marijuana eradication programs during the mid-1970s.
paraquat pot
Name given to cannabis discovered in US cities containing traces of paraquat following a 1975 US government assisted marijuana eradication operation in Mexico during harvest season.
personal cannabis use
Consumption of cannabis for any medical, nonmedical, recreational, religious, responsible, social, spiritual, therapeutic, or other reason.
peyote
Cactus found in Mexico and southwestern Texas used worldwide as an entheogen and supplement to transcendence. Native North Americans have used peyote for spiritual purposes for more than 5,500 years. Mescaline, the primary psychoactive compound isolated from peyote, is a controlled substance in Canada, while possession and use of peyote plants is legal. Peyote is a Schedule I controlled substance in the US, banned except for members of the Native American Church under the American Indian Religious Freedom Act.
pot
Cannabis, possibly derived from Spanish potiguaya, itself possibly derived from potacion de guaya.
pothead
A frequent user of cannabis.
potiguaya
Spanish word for cannabis.
prison–industrial complex
Rapid expansion of the U.S. inmate population due to the political influence of private prison companies and businesses that supply goods and services to government prison agencies for profit.
prohibition
Laws in some jurisdictions banning the cultivation or sales of cannabis in an attempt to prevent its use. These bans are criticized because they create a black market and because enforcement is disproportionate in communities of color.
prohibitionism
A legal philosophy and political theory which holds that citizens will abstain from behaviors if the actions are prohibited and enforced by law. This philosophy has been most notably the basis for acts of statutory law throughout history when a large group of a given population disapproves of, or feels threatened by, an activity in which a smaller group of that population engages, criminalizing the behavior of the feared minority group.
prohibitionist
See drug warrior.
propaganda
Information that is not objective and is used primarily to influence an audience and further an agenda, often by presenting facts selectively to encourage a particular synthesis or perception, or using loaded language to produce an emotional rather than a rational response to the information. Propaganda can be material prepared by governments, organizations, or the media.
Proposition 215
California law enacted by voters in 1996, called the Compassionate Use Act, the first state law allowing medical use of cannabis in the United States.
psilocybin mushroom
Any of 186 species of psilocybin fungi, often called psychedelic, or "magic" mushrooms, banned in the United States under Schedule I of the Controlled Substances Act.
psychonautics
Altered states of consciousness induced by meditation, cannabis, or other substances. [See cannabis culture.]

== R ==
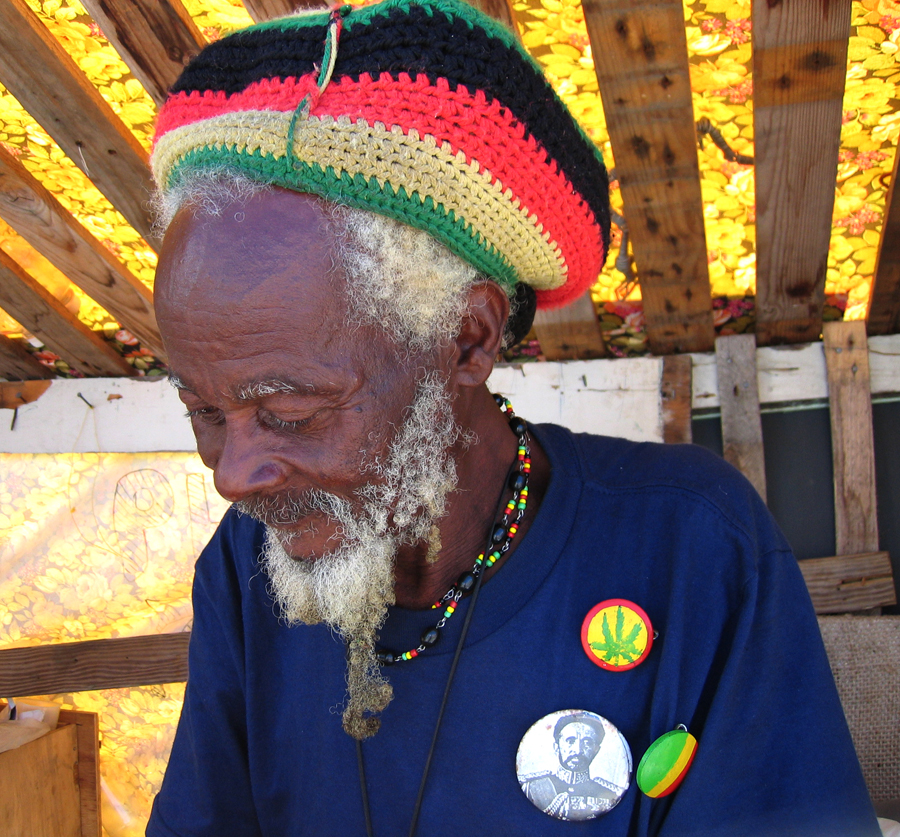
A Rastafari man in Barbados wearing a badge with a cannabis leaf

Rastafari
A religion developed in Jamaica during the 1930s currently with an estimated 700,000 to 1 million members worldwide. [See cannabis and religion.]
reefer
A slang word for cannabis, possibly derived from reefing, or rolling up a canvas sail.
reefer madness
A fictional cannabis psychosis caused by smoking marihuana in the 1936 film Reefer Madness.
Reefer Madness
1936 American anti-cannabis propaganda film, produced under the title Tell Your Children, that depicts marijuana use leading to hallucinations, murder, psychosis, rape, and suicide. The film, now a cult classic, colorized by 20th Century Fox in 2004, was parodied by a 1992 stage adaptation, and by a musical that was broadcast as a television film in 2005. [See prohibition.]
reeferphobe
An individual who feels uncomfortable around people who consume cannabis. Someone who is reeferphobic, or has an irrational fear of cannabis law reform, or someone who exhibits reeferphobia.
reeferphobia
Aversion to, dislike of, or prejudice against marijuana consumers.
reform
A social movement that aims to make gradual change in cannabis policy.
religion and cannabis
Entheogenic and spiritual use of cannabis, and religious use including Rastafari and branches of Modern Paganism.
rig
See dab rig. [See drug paraphernalia.]
roach
Remains of a joint or blunt after most of it has been smoked.
roach clip
A device to hold the butt of a joint while it is burning. [See drug paraphernalia.]
roasted
Slang name for being high. [See effects of cannabis.]
Robert Randall
Author of Marijuana Rx: The Patients Fight for Medical Pot, Robert Randall (1948–2001), who founded the Alliance for Cannabis Therapeutics, was the first person to successfully use a medical necessity defense when he was charged with illegal possession of cannabis to treat his glaucoma. Randall v. United States led to the establishment of the federal Compassionate Investigational New Drug program which ran from 1978 until 1992.
rolling paper
A thin specialty paper used for making cannabis cigarettes. [See drug paraphernalia.]

== S ==
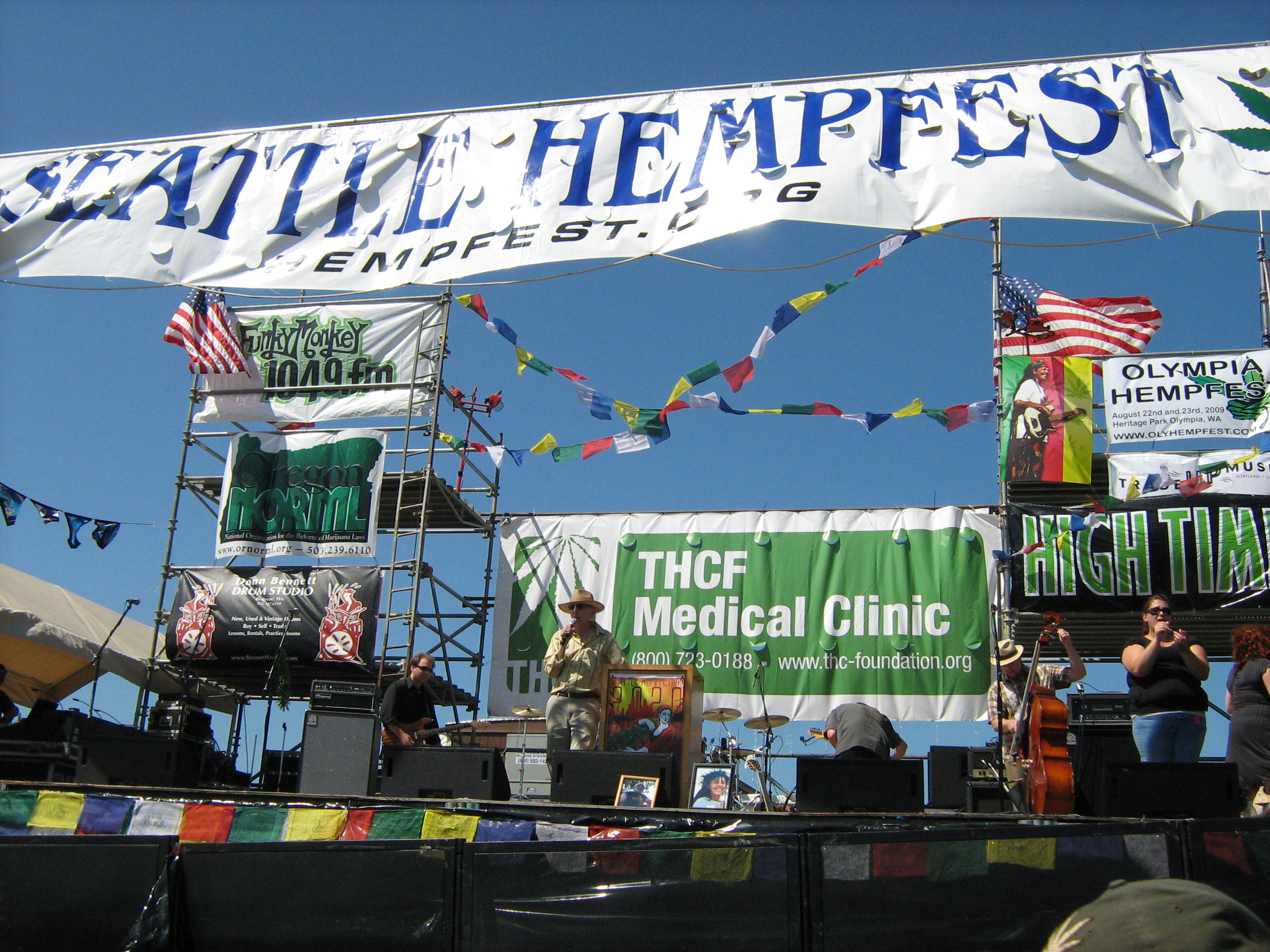
City council member speaking at the 2009 Seattle Hempfest

Samuel Caldwell
A former alcohol peddler during prohibition, Samuel Caldwell (1880–1941) was one of the first people convicted in 1937 under the federal marihuana prohibition law. U.S. "drug czar" Harry Anslinger visited Colorado in order to be present at Caldwell's sentencing. [See prohibition.]
San Marcos Seven or San Marcos 7
Seven demonstrators—Angela Atkins, Jody Dodd, Daniel Rodrigues Scales, Bill O'Rourke, Joe Gaddy, Jeffrey Stefanoff, and Joe Ptak—convicted of misdemeanor possession of cannabis following a series of smoke-in protests at the San Marcos, Texas, police station in March 1991. While incarcerated, Gaddy and Stefanoff went on hunger strikes. A tent city supporting the San Marcos 7 grew outside the Hays County Law Enforcement Center while Stefanoff was jailed.
Schedule I
When Harry Anslinger's 1937 Marihuana Tax Act was ruled unconstitutional by the U.S. Supreme Court, it was replaced by Richard Nixon's 1970 Controlled Substances Act that created a list of Schedules, with cannabis in the most restrictive classification. Schedule I substances are defined by law as having high potential for abuse, no accepted medical use, and cannot be used safely under medical supervision. [See prohibition.]
scromiting
A medical disorder whose proper name is cannabinoid hyperemesis syndrome, where abdominal pain occurs in some heavy users of cannabinoids.
Seattle Hempfest
Annual cannabis pride protest-festival, or "protestival", organized by Vivian McPeak, held since 1991, originally called the Washington Hemp Expo. The 3-day Seattle Hempfest is the world's largest annual cannabis rights gathering, with more than 100,000 people attending each year.
sebsi
A sebsi or sibsi (Berber: ⵙⴻⴱⵙⵉ) is a traditional Moroccan cannabis pipe with a narrow bowl and a fine metal screen. To this a long stem (up to 46 cm/18 in) is attached through which smoke is inhaled
Šedenegi
Šedenegi, šahdānaŷ, šahrānaŷ, šahdanaq, šādānaq, sedeneghi, or shedenegi (a latinised version through Arabic, from Persian, deriving from šāh (i.e., king) and dānah (i.e., seed/grain or knowledge), šahdānaŷ, meaning approximately "the King of Grains" or "the Sultan of seeds") was one of the most-common names used in Middle Ages Europe and the Mediterranean to refer to cannabis, either the hempseeds or, by synecdoche or metonymy, the fruit, the tops, or the Cannabis plant as a whole. Cannabis appeared under this name in early medical texts and pharmacopoeia. [See Formal names of cannabis]
session
Slang name for a cannabis get-together. [See cannabis consumption.]
shadow economy
Black market or underground economy created by prohibition of entheogenic plants including cannabis. The illegal cannabis trade is estimated to be worth $141 billion per year worldwide. However the size and extent of the underground market is likely to be underestimated due to its illicit status.
Shafer Commission
When the 1937 Marihuana Tax Act was ruled unconstitutional by the Supreme Court, it was replaced with Nixon's Controlled Substances Act. Congress temporarily placed cannabis in Schedule I, the most restrictive classification, and the National Commission on Marihuana and Drug Abuse or Shafer Commission was appointed to make a recommendation for its permanent placement. The commission recommended decriminalization of cannabis in 1972, but the recommendation was opposed by a 1974 congressional subcommittee. [See prohibition.]
shatter
A type of extracted cannabis concentrate that is brittle, usually transparent, and breaks like glass. [See cannabis edibles and extracts.]
shisha
An Arabic word for hookah, a traditional water pipe for smoking cannabis. [See drug paraphernalia.]
sinsemilla
Spanish for without seed, a slang name for high quality, dried cannabis.
Sinsemilla Tips
American monthly cannabis technical journal published in the 1980s by Tom Alexander, targeted in 1989 by the Drug Enforcement Administration investigation Operation Green Merchant.
Skunk
Hybrid variety of cannabis that is known for a pungent fragrance. [See cannabis strains.]

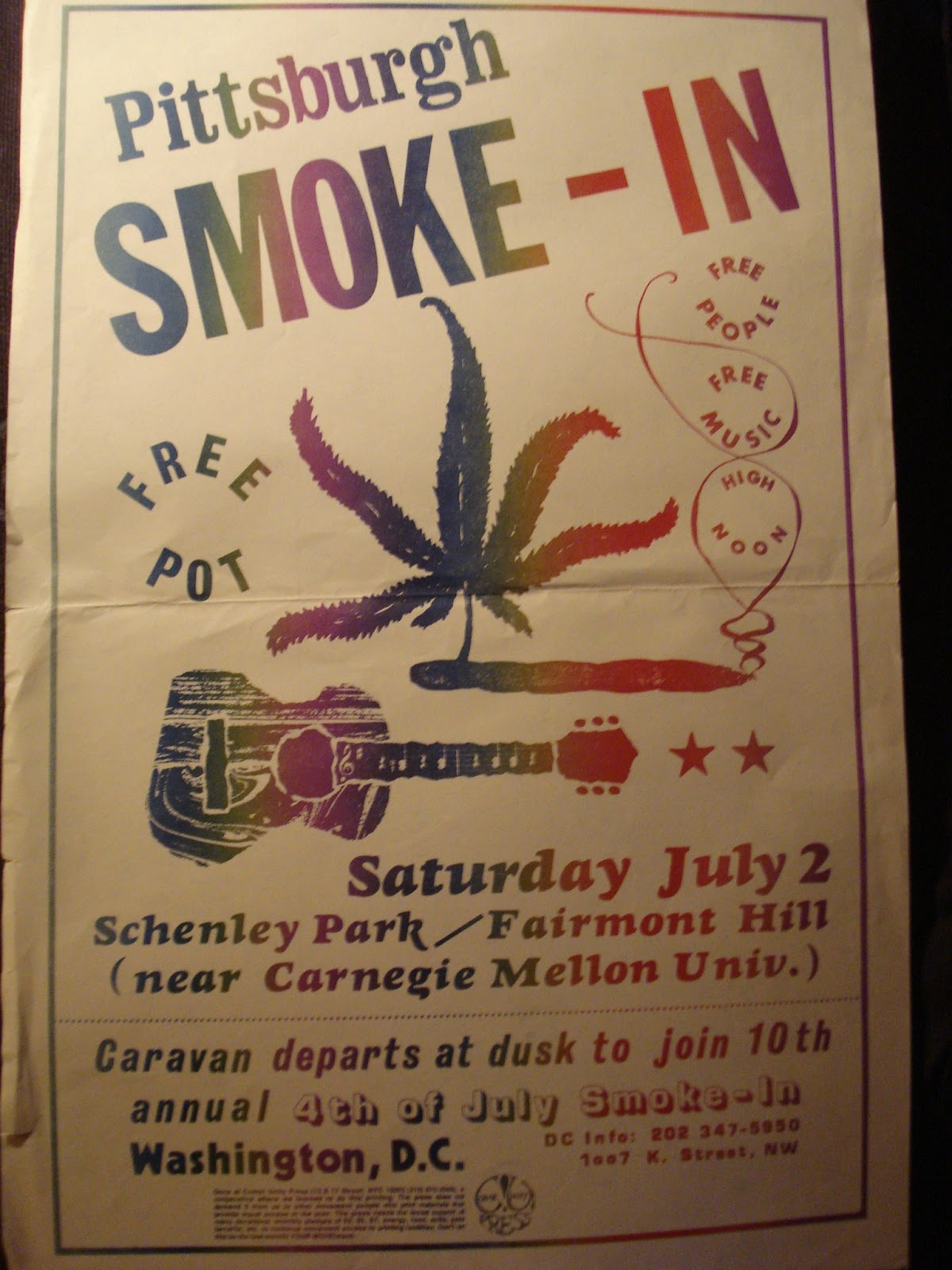
Poster advertising a 1977 Yippie smoke-in in Pittsburgh

smoke-in
The first cannabis rights demonstrations were called smoke-ins, organized by the Youth International Party in the 1970s. A peaceful 1971 Vancouver smoke-in was attacked by police in what was known as the Gastown riot. An Independence Day smoke-in held in Washington, D.C., became an annual event, as did others, including Great Midwest Marijuana Harvest Festival, and Hash Bash.
smoking
A method of consuming cannabis by inhalation of vapors released by burning cannabis or cannabis extracts. [See cannabis consumption.]
snitch
A slang word meaning police informant.
space cake
A slang name for a cannabis edible.
spliff
A slang word for cannabis cigarette. [See joint.]
sploof
A type of handheld filter used for mitigating the smell of exhaled smoke.
stash
Word used to describe a supply of cannabis.
stash box
Any container used for concealing cannabis or valuables. [See drug paraphernalia.]
stoned
Slang name for being under the influence of cannabis. [See effects of cannabis.]
stoner
A slang word meaning heavy cannabis smoker, the word is derogatory except within the cannabis culture.
stoner bashing
Verbal or physical abuse directed against a person who is perceived by the aggressor to be someone who is a consumer of cannabis, including unprovoked threats, intimidation, and offensive jokes made at the expense of a cannabis consumer by an attacker who is in a position of power over the victim.
stoner film
Comedy films in which cannabis use is one of the main themes. [See cannabis culture.]
stoner rights
Civil and human rights of people who consume cannabis, including freedom of religion, and the right to be free from employment discrimination and housing discrimination.
strain
Varieties of cannabis bred for medical or industrial applications. Traditional heirloom strains of cannabis and contemporary hybrid varieties vary broadly because terpenes in the essential oils of the flowers, which give the buds their fragrance, and the ratio of cannabinoids, the more than 100 different therapeutically-active compounds, are infinitely variable.

== T ==
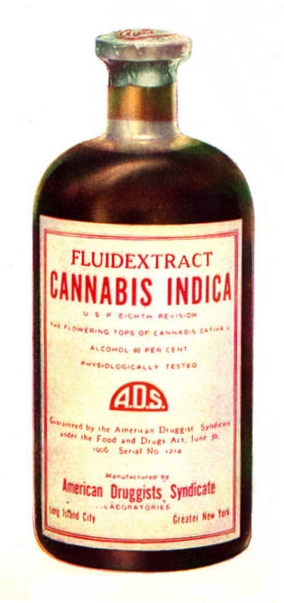
Tincture of cannabis, American Druggists Syndicate, pre-1937

taffy
An extracted cannabis concentrate product that is doughy or flexible. [See cannabis edibles and extracts.]
tax and regulate
A system for U.S. states like Washington and Colorado to legalize cannabis and gain tax revenue from it, versus states like Vermont, and the District of Columbia, which legalized without setting up any regulatory system.
tea
1. A slang name for cannabis.
2. An infusion of cannabis in water. [See cannabis edibles and extracts.]
tea head
A slang name for a cannabis consumer.
tea party
Slang name for a cannabis get-together. [See cannabis consumption.]
terpenes
Organic compounds in the essential oils produced in cannabis trichomes that give the buds their fragrance.
tetrahydrocannabinol or THC
A psychoactive substance found in cannabis, abbreviated THC. [See cannabinoids.]
Thai stick
A variety of cannabis flowers from Thailand tied together around a stick. [See cannabis strains.]
THC Ministry
A Hawai'i cannabis church founded by Roger Christie in 2000. [See cannabis and religion.]
This Is Your Brain on Drugs
1980s-era United States anti-cannabis TV public service announcement that compared drug use to frying an egg, ending with "Any questions?" The ad has been widely parodied. Criticism includes an April 20, 2017, rebuttal advertisement blaming drug prohibition for contributing to mass incarceration, poverty, and structural racism.
three-strikes, you’re out
U.S. three-strikes laws, requiring persons convicted of three felony-level offenses to serve mandatory life sentences, were first implemented in the 1990s as part of President Bush's war on drugs. In some jurisdictions, the resulting harsh sentences have become the subject of controversy.
tincture of cannabis
An alcoholic extract of cannabis. [See cannabis edibles and extracts.]
toke
Slang name for a puff of cannabis smoke or vapor. [See cannabis consumption.]
toker
A slang word meaning one who smokes cannabis.
trees
A slang word for cannabis.
trichomes
Structures giving the cannabis leaf a powdery appearance and containing most of the THC.
trimmigrant
A migrant worker working in the cannabis industry, often as a bud trimmer.

== U ==
undercover agent
A plainclothes police officer, narcotics agent, or informant.
underground economy
Black market or shadow economy created by cannabis prohibition. The illicit cannabis market is estimated to be worth $141 billion per year worldwide. However the size and extent of the illegal black market cannot be fully gauged due to its clandestine nature.
Up in Smoke
1978 American movie starring Cheech & Chong, credited with establishing the stoner film genre of comedy.

== V ==
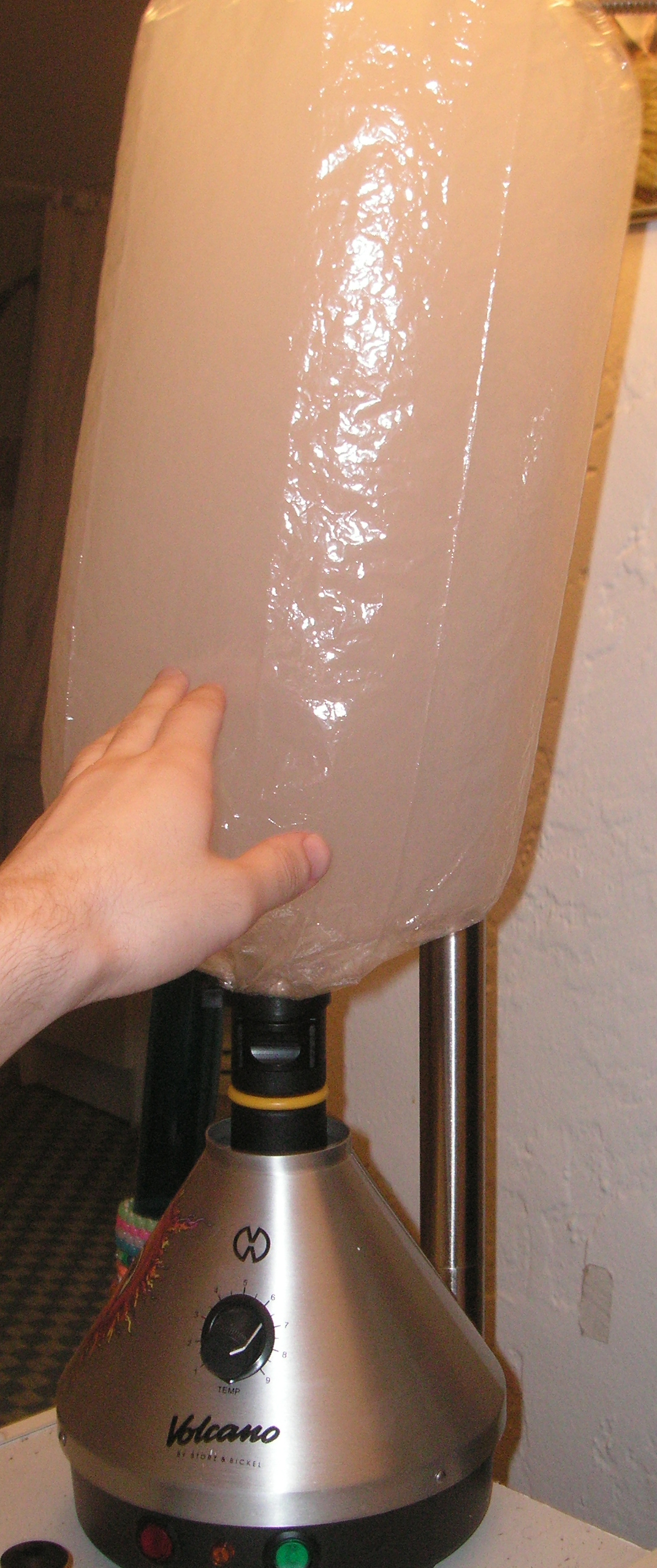
A vaporizer

vape or vape-ing
Act of consuming the active ingredients in cannabis by vaporizing dried flowers or cannabis extracts. [See cannabis consumption.]
vaporizer
A device for smokeless vaporizing and consuming of cannabis or cannabis extracts. [See drug paraphernalia.]
vending machine
Cannabis vending machines, located in Canada and the United States, are used to dispense or sell marijuana.
viper
Jazz-era term for a cannabis smoker.

== W ==
wake and bake
Consumption of cannabis early in the morning.
war on drugs
An American term, popularized by the media after President Richard Nixon, in 1969, formally declared a "war on drugs" including eradication, interdiction, and incarceration. [See prohibition.]
water pipe
Device for filtering cannabis smoke through water, also called a bong, chalice, or hookah. [See drug paraphernalia.]
wax
A type of extracted cannabis. [See cannabis edibles and extracts.]
weed
A slang word for cannabis.
White Widow
Hybrid of Brazilian sativa and Indian indica varieties of cannabis with buds covered in white-colored resin crystals. [See cannabis strains.]
Wootton Report
1968 UK committee that recommended cannabis decriminalisation, finding imprisonment to no longer be an appropriate punishment for possession of a small amount. When the report was published in 1969, some members of Parliament criticized the committee, however the report's recommendations were implemented during the 1970s.

== X ==
x-ray eyed
Extremely under the influence of cannabis.

== Y ==
Yippie
A word referring to the Youth International Party, or its members. [See cannabis culture.]
Youth International Party
The Yippie political party, formed in 1967, often ran candidates for public office to advance the counterculture of the 1960s, engaged in street theater or "pranking the system", and organized the first North American smoke-ins. The Yippie flag is a five-pointed star superimposed with a cannabis leaf.

== Z ==
zero tolerance
Policy of imposing strict punishment for cannabis law violations, which has been criticized because it forbids discretion regarding individual culpability, history, and extenuating circumstances. Zero tolerance policies in schools are said to contribute to a school-to-prison pipeline in the United States. [See prohibition.]

== See also ==
- List of anti-cannabis organizations
- List of cannabis companies
- List of cannabis-related lists
- List of cannabis rights leaders
- List of cannabis rights organizations
- List of names for cannabis
- List of names for cannabis strains
- List of slang names for cannabis

== Sources ==
- Steinmetz, Katy (April 20, 2017). "420 Day: Why There Are So Many Different Names for Weed". Time. Archived from the original on March 23, 2022.
- "The cannabis lexicon", The Cannabist, The Denver Post's The Cannabist, June 13, 2014
- Marin, Cheech; Chong, Tommy (2013), Cheech & Chong's Almost Legal Book for Stoners, Running Press, ISBN 9780762449873
- Green, Johnny (April 29, 2011). "List of Marijuana Slang Terms". The Weed Blog.
- "Marijuana/Cannabis factsheet" (PDF), Drugs of Abuse, Drug Enforcement Administration, 2015, pp. 72–75, archived from the original (PDF) on December 3, 2016
- Partridge, Eric (1989), Beale, Paul (ed.), Partridge's Concise Dictionary of Slang and Unconventional English (8th [abridged] ed.), New York: Macmillan, ISBN 9780026053501
- Halperin, Shirley; Bloom, Steve (2015), Pot Culture: The A-Z Guide to Stoner Language and Life, Abrams, p. 285, ISBN 978-1613128749
- Dalzell, Tom (2009), The Routledge Dictionary of Modern American Slang and Unconventional English, Taylor & Francis, ISBN 9780415371827
