= Cannabis vending machine =

Type of vending machine

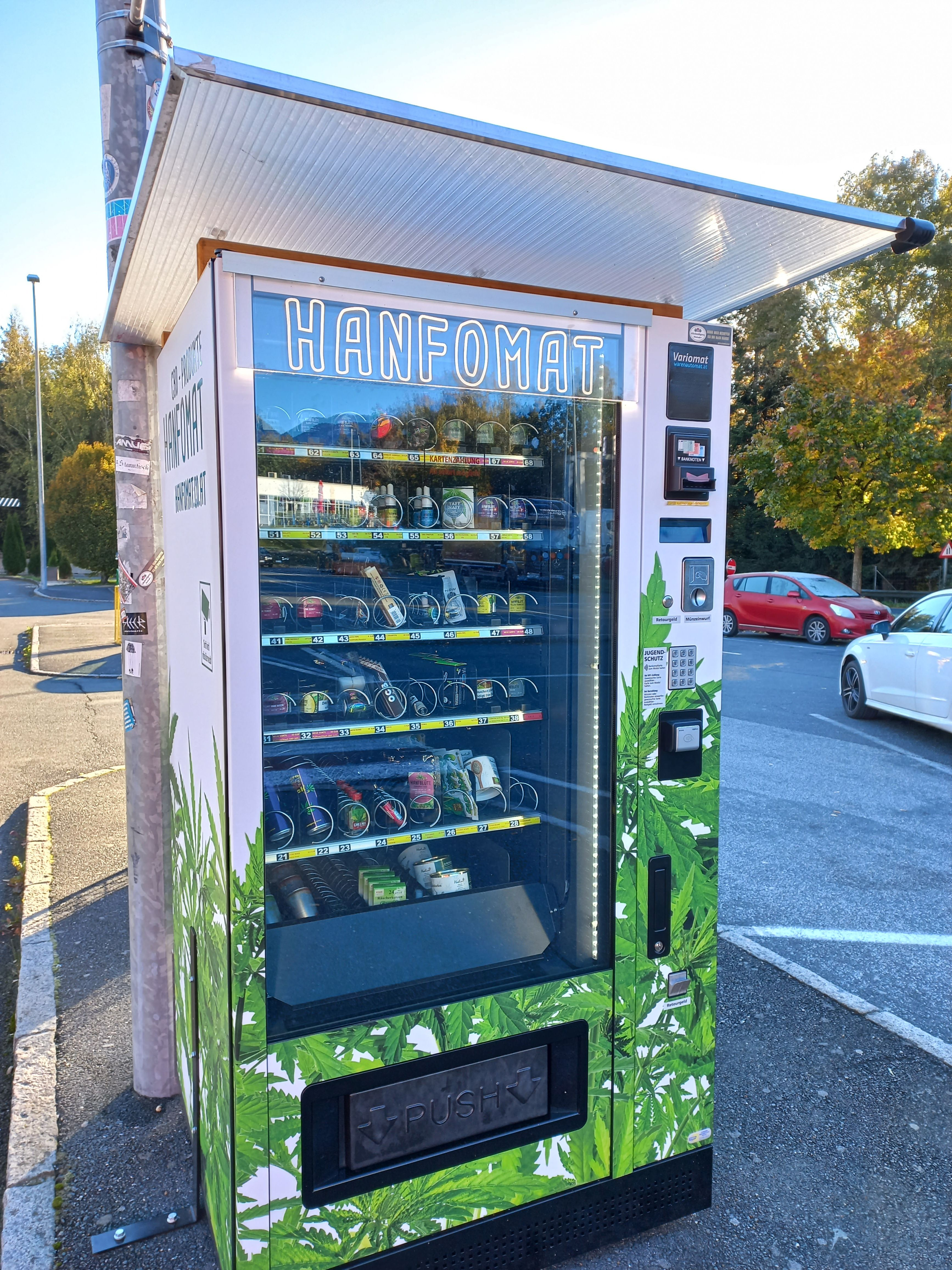

A cannabis vending machine is a vending machine for selling or dispensing cannabis. They are currently in use in the United States and Canada and some may be located in secure rooms in marijuana dispensaries. Some may be operated by employees after a fingerprint scan is obtained from the patient. In Canada in 2013, marijuana vending machines were planned to be used in centres that cultivate the drug. At least three companies are developing the vending machines.

In 2019, a cannabis vending machine was installed in Athens, Greece, for low-THC CBD cannabis products.
