= Tincture of cannabis =

Alcoholic extract of cannabis

Tincture of cannabis, sometimes known as green dragon, is an alcoholic cannabis concentrate. The solubility of THC in ethanol is greater than 1 g/mL.

According to the European Medicines Agency (EMA) cannabis tinctures (tincturea) are a type of liquid cannabis extract obtained using ethanol, water, glycerol, propylene glycol and fatty oils as extraction solvents, depending on the type of tincture (and also on the solvent used) it can have a specific mass/volume ratio or a specific therapeutic agents content.

Cannabis tinctures are used in the production of specific extracts, like nabiximols.

== History ==
Cannabis tincture appeared in the United States Pharmacopoeia until 1942 (Australia 1977, UK 1970s).

The pharmacological target for cannabis, the endocannabinoid system, has been researched since its discovery in the 1980s.

== Preparation ==
The tincture is typically made by soaking the dried flowers of the female hemp plant (marijuana) in ethanol. The tetrahydrocannabinol (THC) and other cannabinoids dissolve into the alcohol. Some preparations also extract some of the water-based plant products such as chlorophyll, resulting in a dark green or brown liquid. Baking or drying the cannabis to decarboxylate prior to the alcohol bath increases the amount of THC in the resulting preparation.

== Methods of use ==
The tincture is ordinarily consumed orally, but may also be applied to the skin.

== Gallery ==
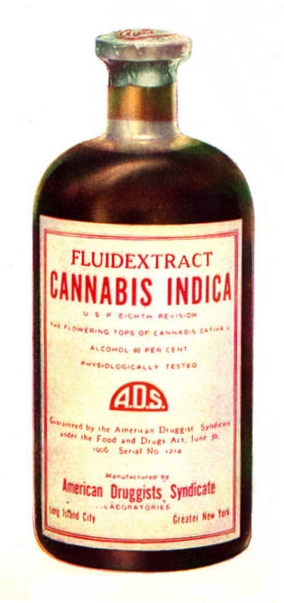
Cannabis indica fluid extract, American Druggists Syndicate, pre-1937

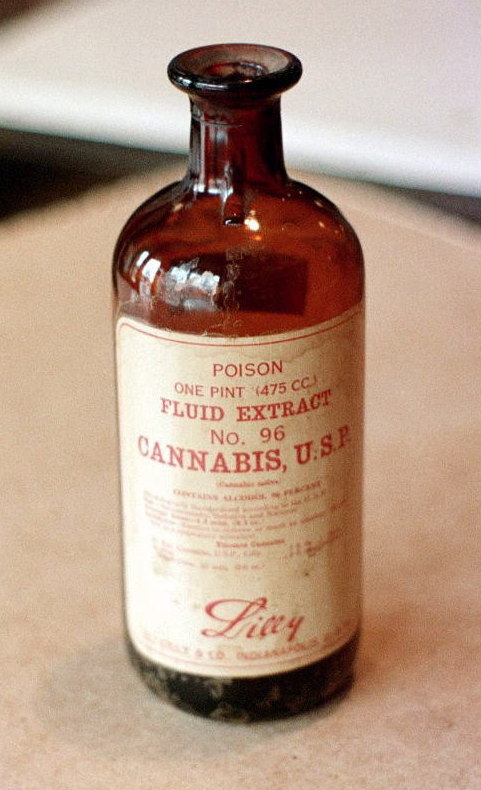
Cannabis Fluid extract bottle

== See also ==
- Hash oil
