= Feral cannabis =

Wild-growing cannabis

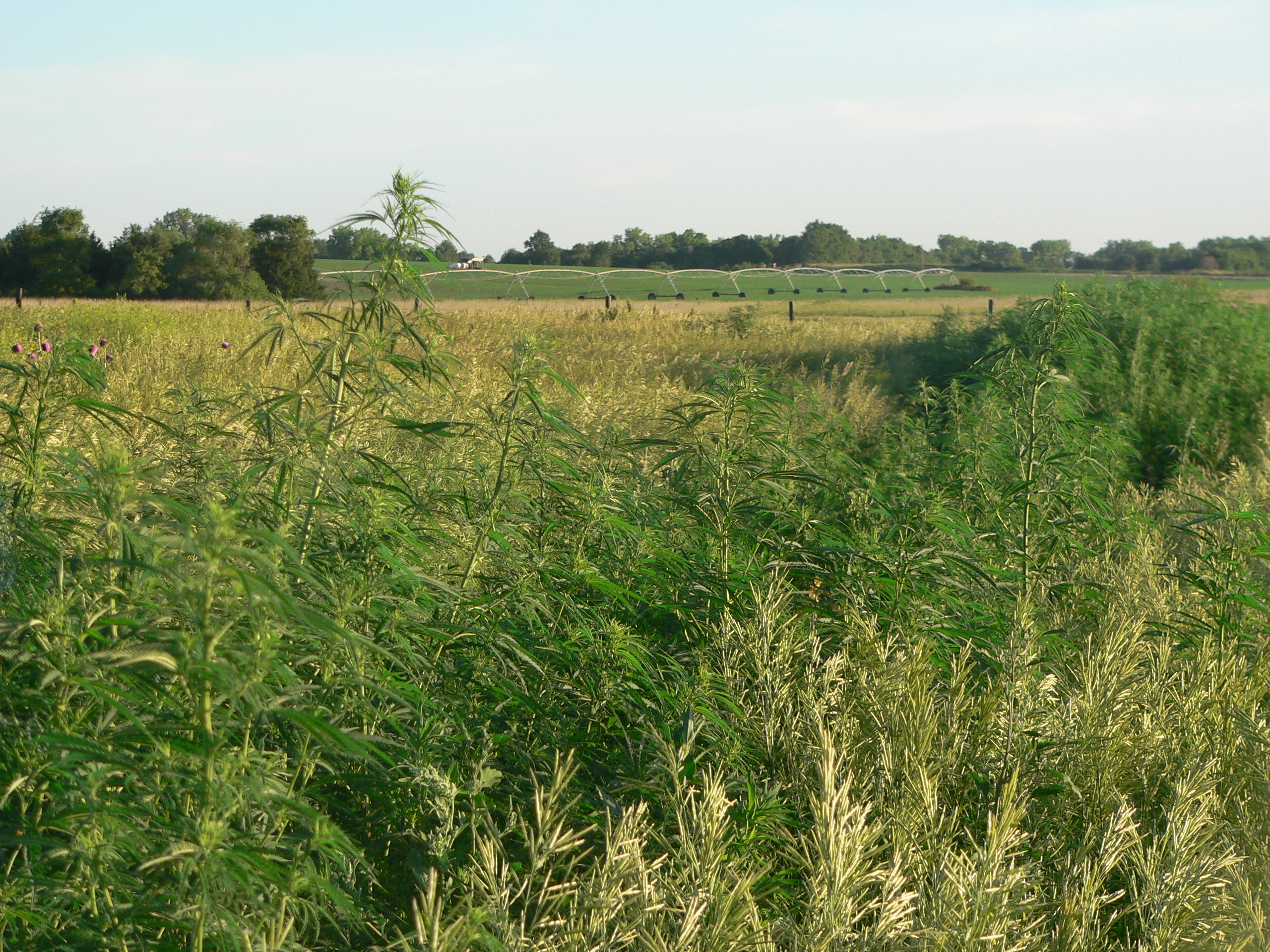
Cannabis growing wild in a ditch in Buffalo County, Nebraska

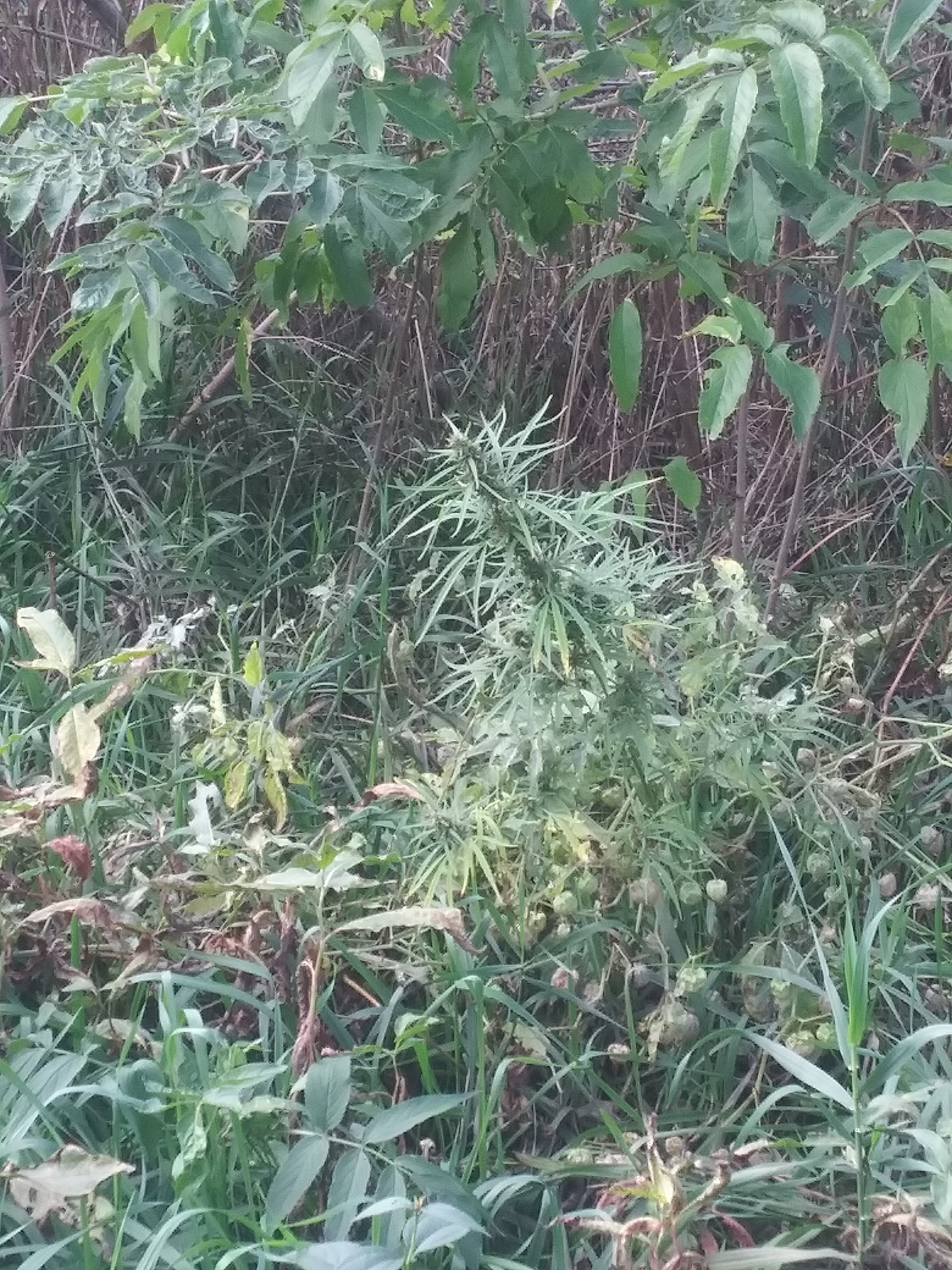
Feral cannabis and a cluster of ground cherries growing on a Midwest bike trail

Feral cannabis, or wild marijuana (often referred to in North America as ditch weed), is wild-growing cannabis generally descended from industrial hemp plants previously cultivated for fiber, with low or negligible amounts of psychoactive tetrahydrocannabinol (THC).

The Drug Enforcement Administration defines ditch weed as "wild, scattered marijuana plants [with] no evidence of planting, fertilizing, or tending". Industrial hemp was widely cultivated in the American Midwest in the mid-20th century, particularly to support the war effort during World War II, and since that period the plant has re-seeded naturally and grown wild in states such as Oklahoma, Missouri, Nebraska, Iowa, and Minnesota, with Indiana reporting the largest concentrations nationally.

As early as 1914, a United States Department of Agriculture publication stated: "Hemp is abundant as a wild plant in many localities in western Missouri, Iowa, and in southern Minnesota, and is often found as a roadside weed throughout the Middle West."

== Eradication ==
Responses to feral cannabis vary by time period and jurisdiction, with some entities putting out efforts to eradicate the plant, while others consider it a very low priority. The DEA's Domestic Cannabis Eradication/Suppression program was founded in 1979 and provides federal funds nationwide to eradicate cannabis. In 1991, the program claimed to have eradicated 118 million feral cannabis plants, mostly in Indiana and Nebraska, versus about 6 million cultivated plants in the same program (95% and 5% of the total, respectively). A 2003 report noted that 99% of the cannabis eradicated under this program in 2003 was feral cannabis, not cultivated plants.

Feral cannabis is an exceptionally hardy weed, widely dispersing its seeds which can lie dormant for 7–10 years before sprouting again. In Minnesota, hemp is classified among the 11 "noxious prohibited weeds" along with several species of thistle, and noted for jamming farmers' plowing equipment.

Particularly in Indiana, where feral cannabis is most concentrated, authorities have largely ceased eradication attempts, with one police spokesman stating "You can eradicate ditch weed as well as you can eradicate dandelion."

== North Korea ==
Wild cannabis is cultivated in North Korea, where the legal status of cannabis is unknown but commonly thought to be legal.
