= Herb grinder =

Shredding equipment

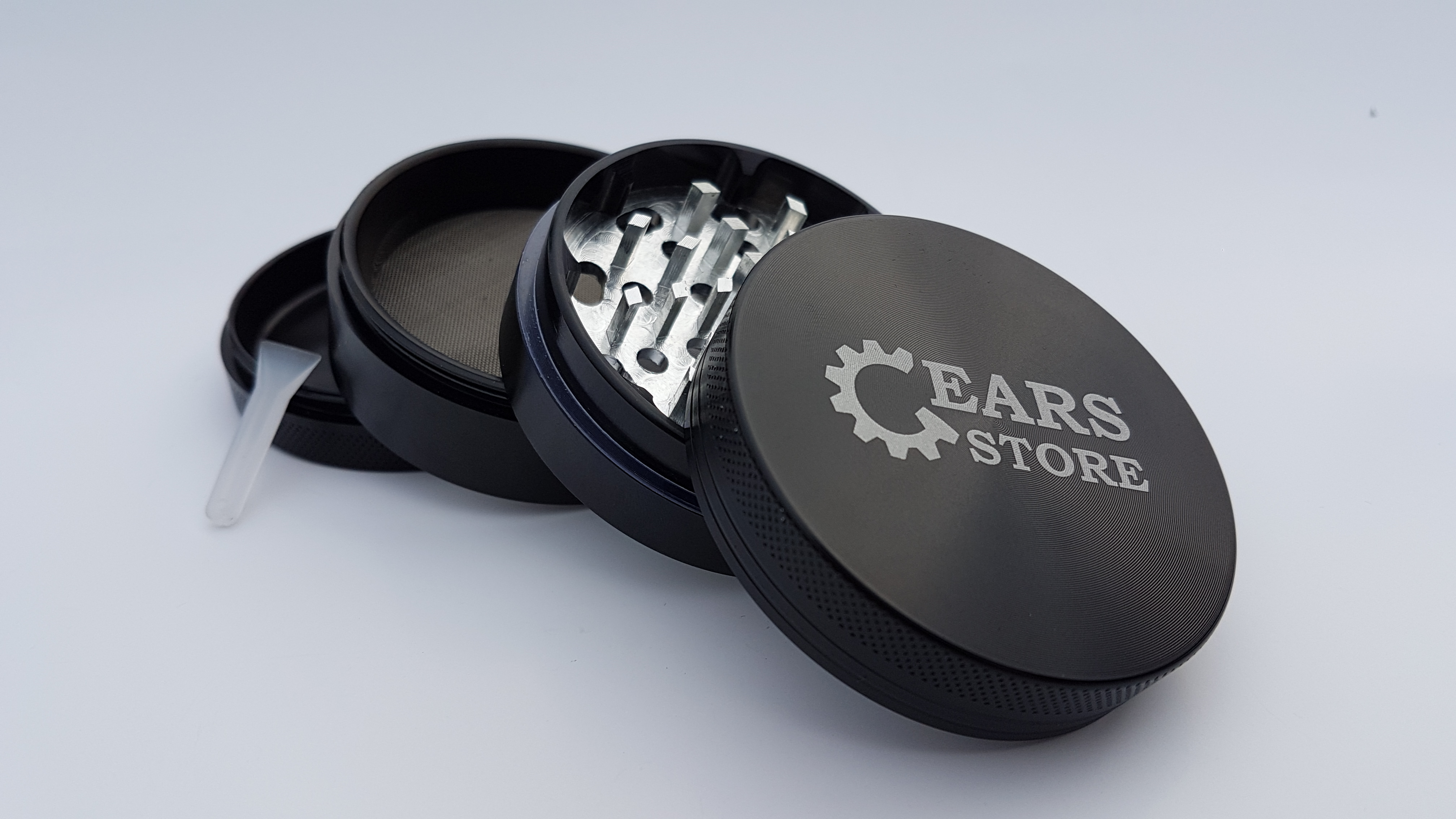
Four piece herb grinder

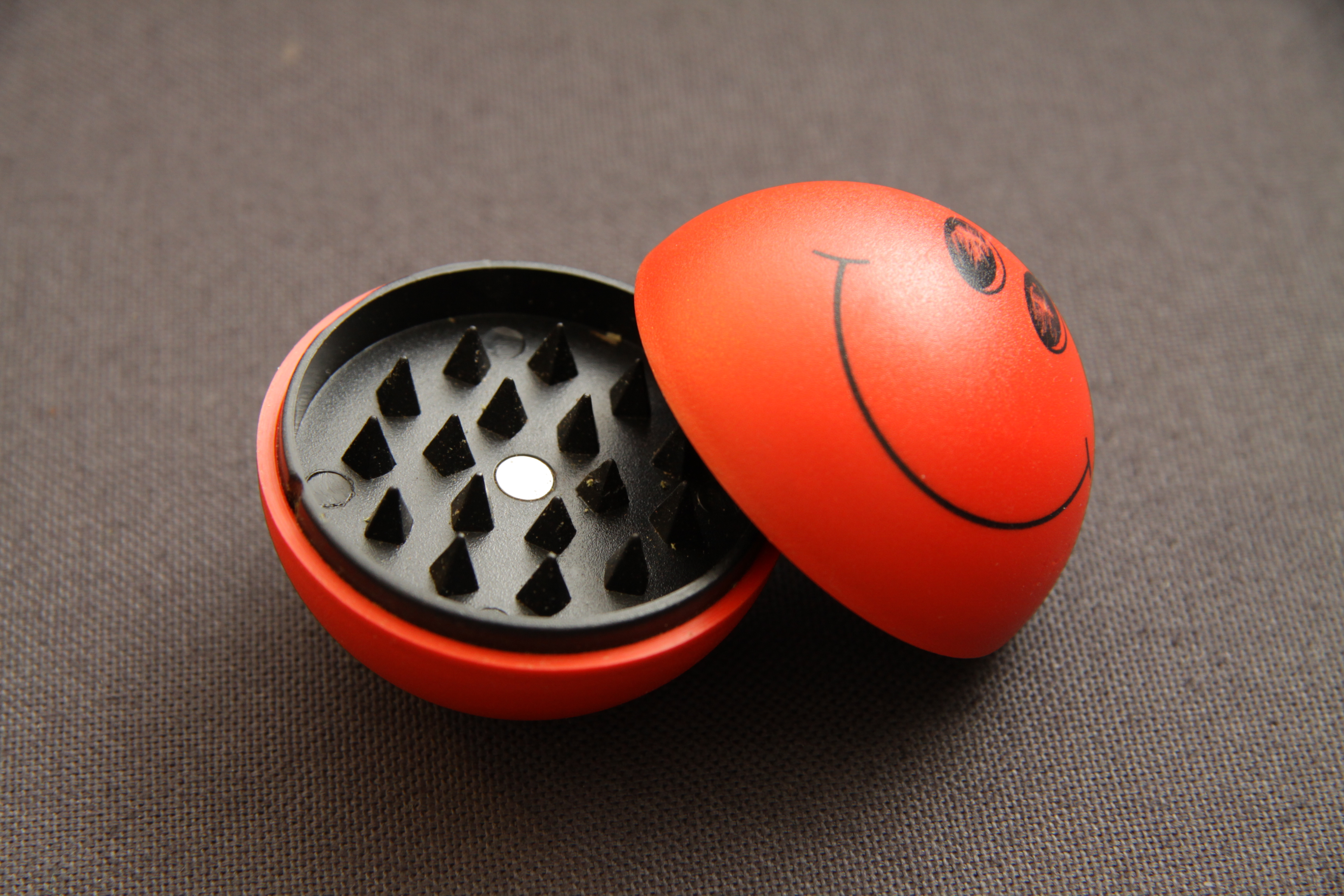
Grinder for smokers

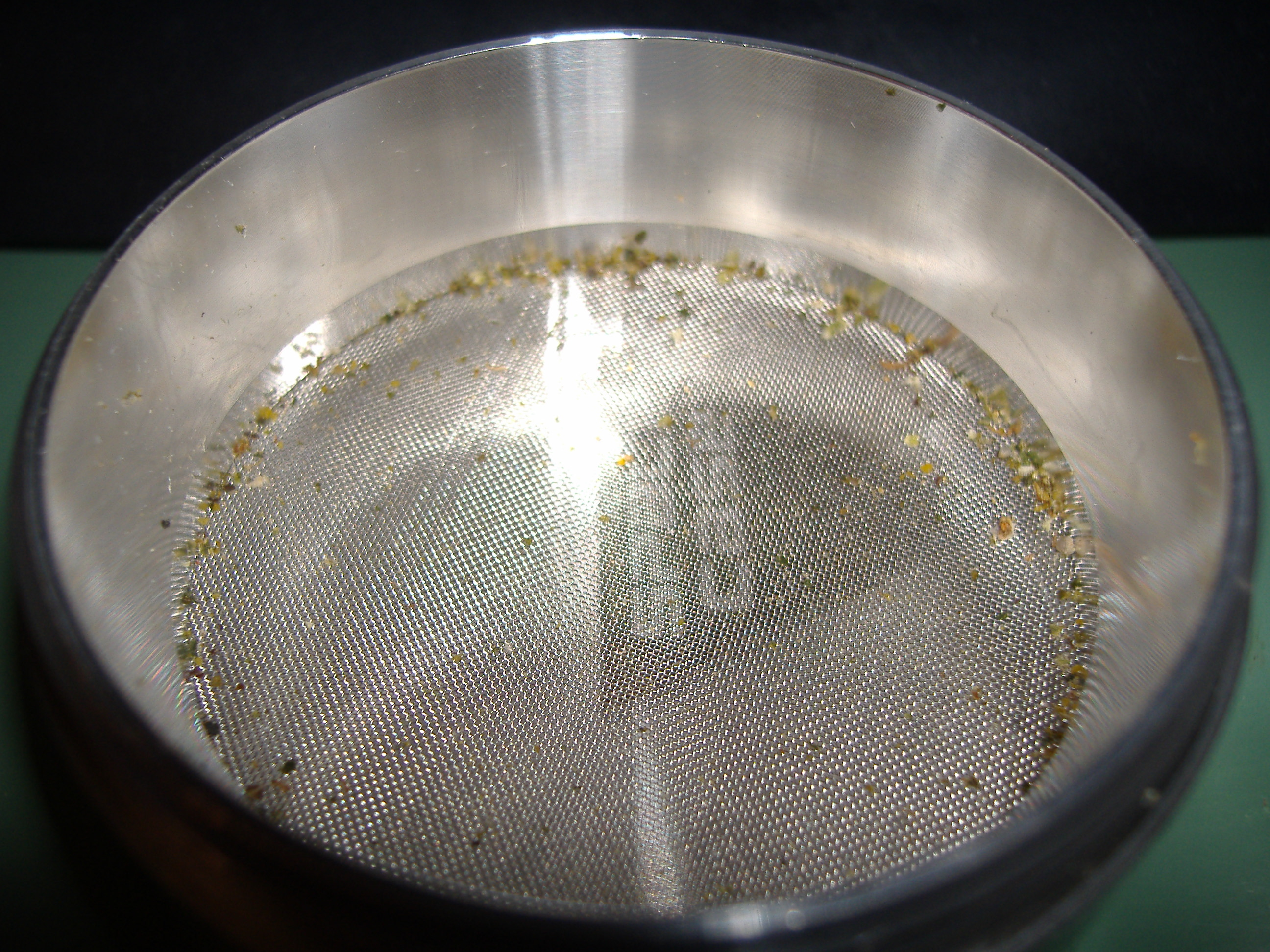
The fine screen of a Space Case which will hold the larger pieces of herb. Also visible is the bottom compartment, where the trichomes will be collected.

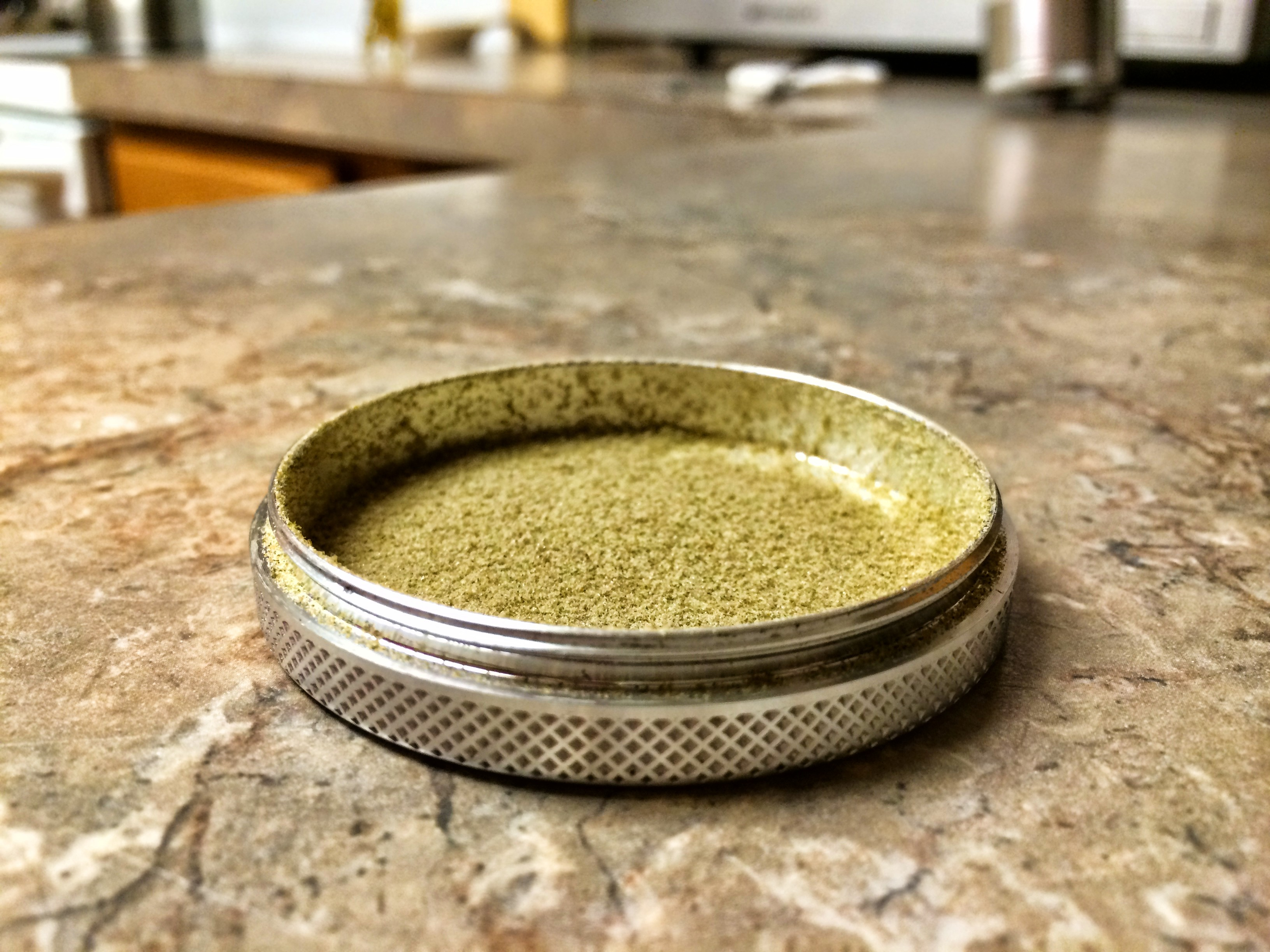
Trichomes, or kief, collected below the screen of a grinder

A herb grinder (or simply, a grinder) is a cylindrical device with two halves (top and bottom) that separate and have sharp teeth, blades, or pegs aligned in such a way that when both halves are turned, material inside is shredded. Though the manufacturers claim they are intended for use with herbs and spices for cooking, they are often used to shred cannabis, and are often unsuitable for actual use with spices (which instead are prepared using a burr grinder), resulting in a product that can be more easily hand-rolled into a "joint" that burns more evenly. Herb grinders are typically made of either wood, metal, or plastic, and come in a variety of colors and polished metals.

Metal grinders are generally made from zinc, aluminum, or stainless steel.

Zinc grinders are the cheapest metal option available, while aluminum grinders are the most common. Aluminum grinders can be made from different grades of metal. Common grades of aluminum are aluminum 6063 and aluminum 6061. To increase the strength of aluminum grinders, they can be anodized, chemically altering the metal to making it stronger and less prone to wear.

Like aluminum, stainless steel herb grinders can be machined from different grades of metal. The most common grade of steel used when machining a herb grinder is 303 stainless steel or 304 stainless steel.

Herb grinders generally come in 2-piece, 3-piece, and 4-piece versions, but there are specialized designs that have more sections.

2-piece grinders don't have holes in the main grinding chamber, and there is no storage section or kief collection tray.

3-piece grinders have holes in the main grinding chamber, and a storage section below the teeth for ground material to subsequently fall into. 3-piece grinders don't have a screen, as some believe the screen unnecessarily siphons potency away from the material.

4-piece grinders are the most common form of grinder, and have at least two compartments, with fine screens separating the bottom compartment from the ones above, thus allowing the marijuana trichomes, or kief, to be collected separately.

The widespread adoption of cannabis as a recreational drug in recent times has caused herb grinders to become synonymous with weed grinders. There are many types of herb grinders out there, from electric to hand cranked, in various styles. Advertisements describing them as "spice grinders" have sometimes confused buyers who were unaware about the actual intended use.
