= Cannabis refugee =

Type of internal migrant

Cannabis refugee (or marijuana refugee) is a term, primarily used in the United States and Canada, referring to people who have moved from one location to another due to cannabis prohibition laws, motivated either by a desire to have legal access to cannabis to treat medical conditions for themselves or their family, or to legally consume cannabis for any other reason. A related term is trimmigrant, which refers to migrant workers who travel to the Emerald Triangle during the summer to work on the seasonal marijuana harvest.
