= List of names for cannabis =

Cannabis has many different names, including more than 1,200 slang terms, and more than 2,300 names for individual strains. Additionally, there are many names to describe the state of being under the influence of the substance. This list is not exhaustive; it includes well-attested names.

== Formal names ==
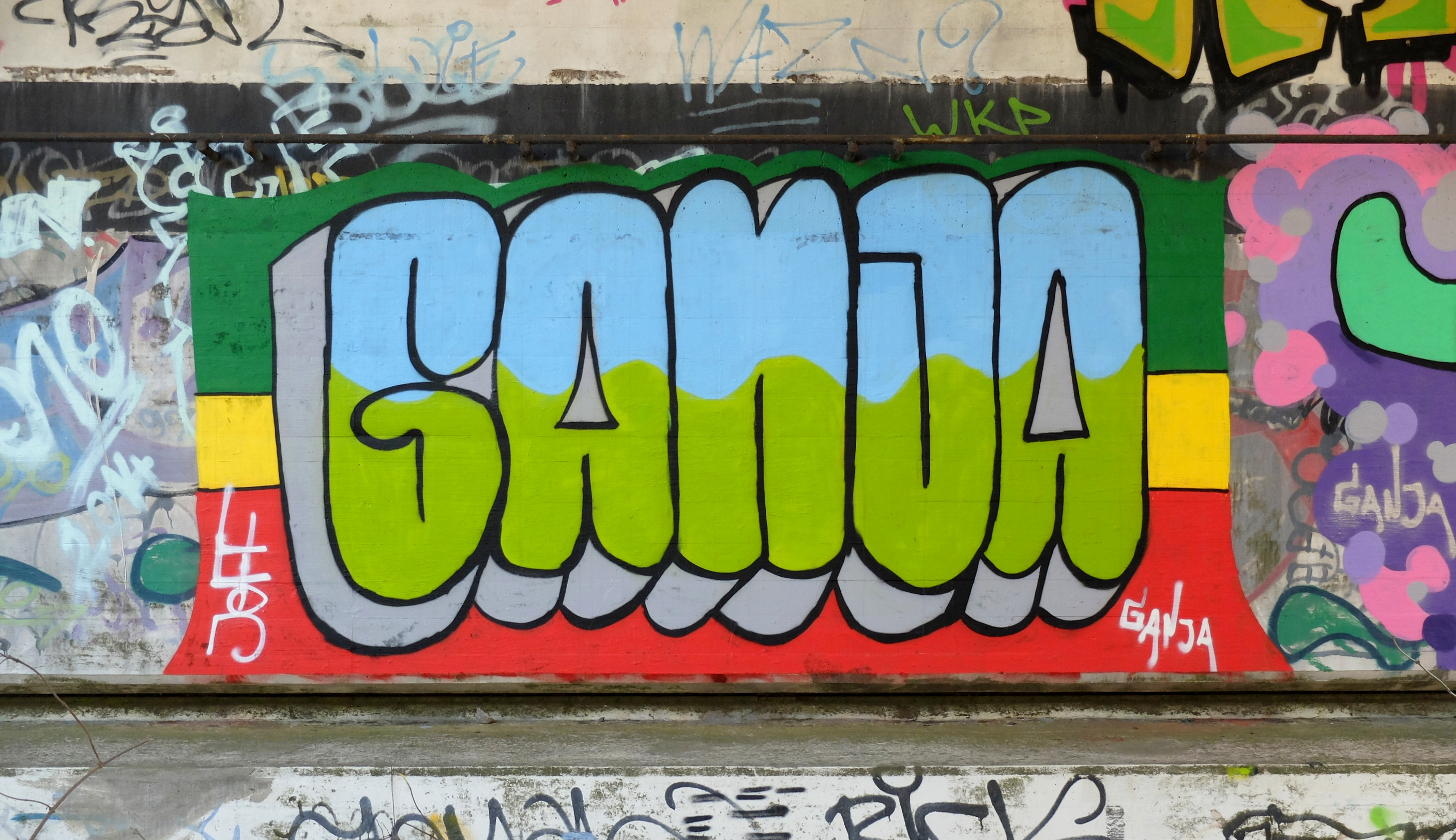
Ganja, a common English synonym for marijuana written in graffiti in Spain

Name	About
al-quinnab / al-quinnam	Forms used in Al-Andalus, including but not limited to: al-quinnab, al-qinnab al-barrī, qinnab al-barrīyya, al-qinnab al-hindī, al-qinnab al-bustānī, qinnab rūmī
"ang" or "an"	A Proto-Indo-European and Proto-Semitic root from which the words for cannabis in "all modern languages" derive, per Alphonse de Candolle.
"kan-"	The proto-Kartvelian stem for hemp. It is more recent than the proto-Indo-European stem.
"san-" and "kan-" or "gan-"	The Proto-Indo-European stem for hemp/cannabis sativa, "san-" and "kan-" or "gan-", existed prior to the 5th century (400 CE). Differently, "k(h)an-" indicates singing/making a sound.
भांग (bhang)	Hindi, sixteenth century, from Sanskrit "bhaṅgáḥ", "bhaṅgā" (see below). Also recorded as Persian. Garcia de Orta recorded the name as "bangue", as did Jan Huyghen van Linschoten. Used in British English, it can also be spelt "bang", and retains much of the original meaning. In American English it may refer to hemp or a tea made from hemp that is either drunk or smoked. The Bhangmeter, a type of radiometer, is named as a pun on "Bhang". The dictionary definition of bhang at Wiktionary.
bhaṅgā	An ancient Sanskrit name originating before the 5th century (400 CE).
bhangi	Swahili. Note: Bhangi is also a Hindi term for a person who uses bhang.
cáñamo	Spanish, from Greek "kánnabos" and Andalusi Romance "quinnam". Originally, also poetically used to refer to objects made of hemp. The dictionary definition of cáñamo at Wiktionary.
canapa	Italian; an 1894 Italian botany study of the plant notes the word has the same etymology as the French "chanvre". The dictionary definition of canapa at Wiktionary.
cannabis	Main article: Etymology of cannabis Latin. English botanical name. Assigned in the mid-eighteenth century, cannabis and hemp describe the entire cannabis plant for all its uses. Dried preparations of the plant are also called ganja, one of the oldest and most commonly used synonyms for marijuana. The dictionary definition of cannabis at Wiktionary.
cần sa	Vietnamese.
Chamba	Chichewa.
Chanvre	French; Alphonse de Candolle, the first authority on cultivated plants, wrote that like all other modern terms for cannabis, "chanvre" ultimately derives from proto-Indo-European "ang". The dictionary definition of chanvre at Wiktionary.
चरस (Charas)	Hindi.
Dagga	Afrikaans and English.
Diamba	Kimbundu.
Esrar	Turkish.
ගංජා (Gaṁjā)	Sinhala.
Gandia	Mauritius.
Ganja	Hindi or Bengali.
గంజాయి (Gan̄jāyi)	Telugu.
Gañjikā	An ancient Sanskrit name originating before the 5th century (400 CE).
Grifa	Mexican Spanish.
Hanf	German.
Hamp	Danish.
Hampa	Swedish.
Hamppu	Finnish.
Hashish	Arabic. Also "assis", per Jan Huyghen van Linschoten. Alphonse de Candolle described hashish as an "environmental material"; he included the Egyptians of the 18th century primarily cultivating cannabis for hashish in his list of places where the plant (which he primarily saw as a textile producer) was not popular.
Hemp	English, name for cannabis plant.
Hennep	Dutch.
Hursīnī	An ancient Sanskrit name originating before the 5th century (400 CE).
Injaga	Rwanda.
Kanas	Celtic.
കഞ്ചാവ് (Kañcāv)	Malayalam; from the Dravidian root "kan" (eye), which can also refer to nipples, star on a peacock's tail, and buds.
Kaņepes	Latvian.
កញ្ឆា (Kanhchhea)	Khmer.
Kan-jac	Panamanian Spanish.
Kάνναβις (Kánnabis)	An ancient Greek name originating before the 5th century (400 CE).
กัญชา (Kạỵchā)	Thai.
Kenevir	Turkish.
قنب (Kinnab or Quinnab)	An ancient Arabic name originating before the 5th century (400 CE). May also have been spelt "Cannab".
Konopí	Czech.
Konopie	Polish.
Конопля (Konoplya)	Russian; derives from proto-Indo-European or proto-Kartvelian.
Kunnabu	An ancient Akkadian name originating before the 5th century (400 CE).
麻 (Má)	Má, a Chinese name for hemp, predates written history and has been used to describe medical marijuana since at least 2700 BCE. It is the earliest recorded name. Hemp is recorded in the Book of Documents.
Ma-kaña	Bantu.
Maconha	Portuguese.
Marijuana	Americanized Mexican Spanish. The term has a complex etymology, derived from western Central African slaves (notably, the Kimbundu word riamba/mariamba) transformed through Caribbean and South American influences info mariguana, later marihuana and marijuana.
Mbanje	Shona.
Pakalolo	Hawaiian.
Pango	Portuguese.
Potiguaya	Spanish.
삼 (Sam-gwa)	Korean.
Šedenegi / šahdānaŷ	From Persian origins, meaning approximately "the King of Grains" / "the Sultan of all seeds"; used to refer to seeded tops of cannabis and hemp plants in the Mediterranean region and particularly Al-Andalus. Also found as šahrānaŷ, šahdanaq, šādānaq, sedeneghi, shedenegi.
Siddhi	Bengali.
ירוק (Yarok) ירק (Yerek)	Yerok is literal translation for the color green and Yerek is literal translation for the word vegetables in Hebrew.

== Strains, cultivation and preparation ==
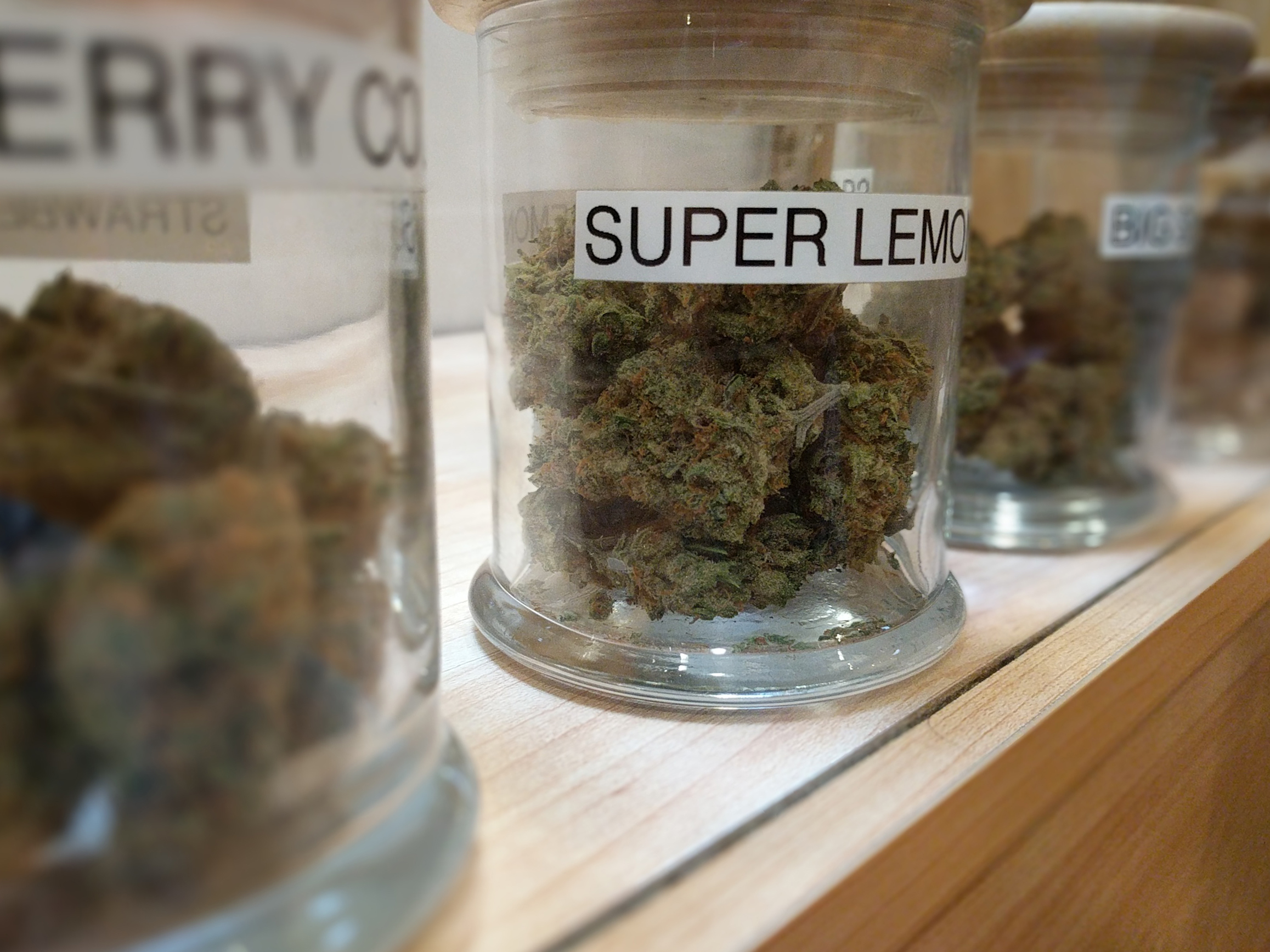
Three strain varieties at a recreational dispensary in Denver, Colorado

Commercial cannabis growers and retailers have given individual strains more than 2,300 names. A 2022 study in PLOS One, drawing data from almost 90,000 samples from six US states, representing the largest quantitative chemical mapping of commercial dispensary-grade cannabis flower samples to date, found that "commercial labels do not consistently align with the observed chemical diversity." In other words, many strain names do not necessarily reflect the actual cannabinoid content or its perceived effects.

Name	About
AK-47	Industry trade name for sativa-dominant hybrid strain. It may be named after an AK-47 assault rifle due to its gunpowder smell and potency, or because the letters "AK" are the initials of the breeder and 47 is the number of days from planting to harvest.
Acapulco Gold	Traditional heirloom strain of cannabis named for its location of origin (Acapulco) and typical color.
Afghani	Traditional heirloom strain of cannabis.
African	Traditional heirloom strain of cannabis.
Amnesia	Industry trade name for cannabis strain.
Amnesia Haze	Industry trade name for cannabis strain.
BC Big Bud/BC Roadkill/BC Hydro	Industry trade name for cannabis strain. Initially cultivated in British Columbia, first called Red Hair Sensi, a hybridization of Panama Red/Acapulco Gold strains brought from Colorado by Vietnam War draft dodgers or BC Roadkill Skunk and Indica Deep Chunk.
BC OG Kush	Industry trade name for cannabis strain. Initially cultivated in British Columbia, at the BC Bud farm, a hybridization of BC Grapefruit Kush and Afghani strains.
Bhang	Hindi (see above). Traditionally refers to the leaves of hemp plants, or to a traditional Indian cannabis leaves tea preparation. Bhang is culturally significant in India, and is not technically banned, as the Narcotic Drugs and Psychotropic Substances Act, 1985, specifically does not outlaw using seeds and leaves of the cannabis plant, of which the common tea drink is made. Bhang (referring to cannabis in general) can also be acquired medically. The narcotics act does not list bhang/cannabis, instead documenting both charas and ganja (as cannabis plant products) separately; in the 1961 Single Convention on Narcotic Drugs, cannabis leaves are not included in the definition of cannabis for Indian legal purposes.
Blueberry	Industry trade name for cannabis strain.
Blueberry Diesel	Industry trade name for indica-dominant hybrid strain, a mix of Blueberry and Sour Diesel strains, its name is also a combination of theirs.
Blue Dream	Industry trade name for sativa-dominant hybrid strain.
Blue Goo	Industry trade name for sativa-dominant hybrid strain, a mix of Blue Dream and Agoo, a combination of which gives it its name.
Bruce Banner	Industry trade name for cannabis strain.
Bubba Kush	Industry trade name for cannabis strain.
Bubblegum	Industry trade name for cannabis strain.
Bud	English. Part of a cannabis plant.
Budder	English, from bud and butter. Industry trade name for cannabis extract.
Cambodian red	Traditional heirloom strain of cannabis.
Cannabinoid	A class of active compounds identified in cannabis.
Cannabis	See above
Cannabis edible	English. Food product with cannabis content.
Cannabis indica	Latin. Putative plant varieties or sub-varieties of cannabis.
Cannabis ruderalis	Latin. Putative plant varieties or sub-varieties of cannabis.
Cannabis sativa	Latin. Putative plant varieties or sub-varieties of cannabis.
Cannabis tea	English. Tea infused with cannabis.
Charas	Hindi. Traditional resin made from live cannabis plant.
Charlotte's Web	Industry trade name for cannabis sativa strain.
Cola	English. Part of a cannabis plant.
Colombian	Traditional heirloom strain of cannabis.
Concentrate	English. Industry trade name for cannabis extract.
Critical Mass	Industry trade name for cannabis strain.
Durban Poison	Traditional heirloom strain of cannabis.
Extract	English. Wax product.
Feral cannabis or feral hemp	Wild cannabis strain.
Flower	English. Part of a cannabis plant.
Girl Scout Cookies	Industry trade name for cannabis strain.
Gorilla Glue	Industry trade name for cannabis strain.
Grape Ape	Industry trade name for cannabis strain.
Hashish	Arabic. Traditional resin made from dead cannabis plant.
Hash oil	Arabic, English. Oil extract of hashish.
Hawaiian	Traditional heirloom strain of cannabis.
Haze	Industry trade name for cannabis strain.
Hemp	English. Plant from which cannabis is derived.
Hindu Kush	Industry trade name for cannabis strain.
Island Pink Kush	Industry trade name for cannabis strain. A hybridization strain cultivated in British Columbia of Island Pink with BC OG Kush
Jack Herer	Industry trade name for cannabis strain.
Jamaican gold	Traditional heirloom strain of cannabis.
Kief	Moroccan Arabic. Loose cannabis trichomes.
Leaf	English. Part of a cannabis plant.
Live resin	English. Industry trade name for cannabis extract.
Matanuska Thunderfuck (MTF)	Industry trade name for sativa-dominant cannabis strain.
Maui Waui	Industry trade name for cannabis strain.
Mexican red	Traditional heirloom strain of cannabis.
Northern Lights	Industry trade name for cannabis strain.
OG Kush	Industry trade name for cannabis strain.
Orange Bud	Skunk
Panama red	Traditional heirloom strain of cannabis.
Paonia Purple	Industry trade name for cannabis indica strain.
Pineapple Express	Industry trade name for cannabis strain.
Platinum OG	Industry trade name for cannabis indica strain.
Purple Kush/Haze	Industry trade name for cannabis strain. A hybridization cultivated in Oakland, California from Hindu Kush and Purple Afghani.
Resin	English. Part of a cannabis flower.
Root	English. Part of a cannabis plant.
Seed	English. Part of a cannabis plant.
Shatter	English. Industry trade name for cannabis extract.
Sinsemilla/sin-semilla	Spanish, lit. "without seeds". Marijuana grown in the absence of male cannabis plants so that the pistils of the females will not be pollinated and thus do not form seeds, resulting in greater potency of the product.
Skunk	Industry trade name for cannabis strain.
Sour Diesel	Industry trade name for cannabis sativa strain.
Stem	English. Part of a cannabis plant.
Strawberry Cough	Industry trade name for cannabis strain.
Super Lemon Haze	Industry trade name for cannabis sativa strain.
Tangerine Dream	Industry trade name for cannabis strain. A hybridization of G13, Afghani, and Neville's A5 Haze.
Terpene	English. Part of a cannabis flower.
Thai stick	"Thai stick" redirects here. For the book, see Thai Stick. Traditional heirloom strain of cannabis, and method of preparation. The strain is a high quality bud originating in northeast Thailand, where it was grown by hill tribes since antiquity. The name comes from a traditional Thai method of preparing cannabis to be smoked, which involved wrapping cannabis bud around a stick. The stick was either bamboo or a hemp stalk; the bud may have been treated with hash oil before wrapping and would have been wrapped around the stick with fan leaves and/or silk string. The stick was then cured underground, and may be dipped in opium before smoking. The Thai stick cigars used Thai bud Cannabis sativa, which also became known as Thai stick. When the original Thai sticks were popular, dealers would sell any buds bound in string or to a stick under the name. Most of the original bud was destroyed in the 1970s when the Thai government began its war on drugs. Making Thai stick-style cannacigars out of other strains continued around the world, though the Thai government legalized medical cannabis again in 2018.
Tincture	English. Alcohol cannabis product.
Tochigishiro	Industry trade name for non-narcotic cannabis sativa strain. It originates in Tochigi Prefecture, Japan, with the modern variety produced in Tochigi-shi.
Trichome	English. Part of a cannabis flower.
Wax	English. Industry trade name for cannabis extract.
White Russian	Hybrid cannabis strain. It is a mix of AK-47 and White Widow, of which its name is also a combination (AK-47 is Russian) and a pun on the alcoholic drink White Russian.
White Widow	Industry trade name for hybrid cannabis strain.
Willie Nelson	Industry trade name for cannabis strain.
Zaza	Slang term for cannabis, popularized via hip-hop music and internet culture.

== Medical cannabis: chemical compounds and pharmaceutical drugs ==
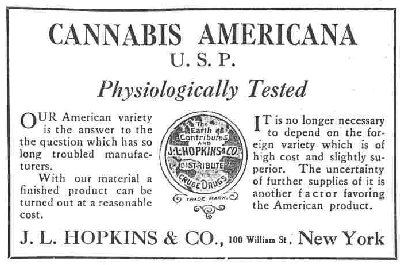
Advertisement for "Cannabis Americana" medical cannabis

Name	About
Cannabinoid	The general class of the therapeutic compounds found in cannabis.
Tetrahydrocannabinol (THC)	There are 9 isomers of tetrahydrocannabinol. Among these, the main psychoactive isomer isolated from cannabis is dronabinol (delta-9-THC).
Dronabinol (delta-9-THC)	International Nonproprietary Name (INN) for delta-9-THC (psychoactive), whether synthetic or natural.
Cannabidiol (CBD)	Compound isolated from cannabis (non psychoactive). Cannabidiol is also the INN.
Cannabinol (CBN)	Compound isolated from cannabis (mildly psychoactive).
Cannabigerol (CBG)	Compound isolated from cannabis (non psychoactive).
Cannabidivarin (CBDV)	Compound isolated from cannabis (non psychoactive).
Nabilone	Synthetic cannabinoid, THC analogue (psychoactive).
Nabiximols	Cannabis extract and botanical drug, CBD and THC combination (psychoactive).

== Formal terms relating to cannabis consumption ==
Name	About
Appetite	Effect of consuming cannabis.
Drink	Method of consuming cannabis.
Edible	Method of consuming cannabis.
Smoke	Method of consuming cannabis.
Topical	Method of consuming cannabis.
Vapor	Method of consuming cannabis.

== See also ==
- Glossary of cannabis terms
- List of cannabis-related lists
