= Scott Blakey =

Australian cannabis grower

- Born: Melbourne, Australia
- Other name: Shantibaba
- Education: University of Melbourne
- Known for: Cannabis genetics

Scott Blakey a.k.a. Shantibaba is a cannabis breeder who currently operates from Switzerland and is known for creating the cannabis strains White Widow, Super Silver Haze, White Rhino, Critical Mass and El Nino. Cannabis companies that Blakey has owned include Mr. Nice Seedbank, Greenhouse Seed Co. and CBD Crew and Sciva Corporation.

Blakey estimates he travelled roughly 40,000 miles on his 1964 Royal Enfield Bullet motorbike through Central and South Asia in the 1980s, gathering marijuana strains from local breeders and families in India, Afghanistan, Pakistan, Burma and Bhutan. Blakey took these genetics and worked on them with fellow cannabis colleague, Neville Schoenmakers up until out in 1998. In 2003, Blakey was arrested at the Italy-Switzerland border for allegedly trafficking large quantities of cannabis and depositing millions of Euros into Swiss bank accounts. Blakey was detained in a Swiss prison for two months before the charges were dropped.

== Biography ==
Blakey was born in 1964 in Melbourne, Victoria, Australia to an Australian mother and English father. He began smoking cannabis at the age of 13, and was instantly drawn to the experience that the plant offered. Blakey completed high school at the age of 16, before attending The University of Melbourne where he studied science from 1981 to 1985. During this time, he would travel to Mullumbimby by car and bring cannabis down to the university to sell to other individuals as enamoured by the plant as he was.

== Early seed research and collection ==
Blakey spent a considerable amount of time travelling around Asia during the 1980s and estimates that he covered close to 40,000 miles on his 1964 Royal Enfield Bullet motorbike, where he collected cannabis seeds of local landrace strains between 1982 and 1986. The main countries he travelled to included Burma, Thailand, Malaysia, Singapore, and India, with a considerable amount of time spent in a plant nursery within an ashram in Pondicherry known as ‘The Mother.’ In this Ashram, he was given the name "Shantibaba" (peace person) by the local Sadhus.

In 1986, Blakey toured the South American continent for 11 months, collecting seed and pods for his own private seed bank and research. During this time, he visited Peru, Colombia, Ecuador, Bolivia and Chile. He also covered the desert and jungle regions, and the Andes.

== The Amsterdam years ==
Shantibaba moved to Amsterdam in 1988 where he became an integral contributor to the "coffee shop" scene with a knack for producing high quality charas from his extensive seed collection. In 1994 he co-founded the Greenhouse Seed Co. with Arjan Roskam, whilst he was working closely with Neville Schoenmakers. Together, they went on to win many awards including the Cannabis Cup for White Widow, Super Silver Haze, White Rhino and El Nino. Scott and Neville developed the NL5 x Haze seed line, which is the foundation for many popular haze hybrids. In 1998 Shantibaba took out all first and second prizes for Super Silver Haze, Mango Haze and Shantibaba's Hash. Scott and Neville always valued plants over profits and at the peak of success, this unfortunately led to a falling out with Arjan due to their contrasting priorities.

At this point in time, Blakey took all of his mother and father plants, and teamed up with his friend and international drug smuggler, Howard Marks to create Mr. Nice Seedbank. Many new and old strains were made available through this new venture, including strains such as Shit, Devil and Spice. With the help of Neville Schoenmakers, Shantibaba decided to change the names of many strains that had brought him fame, in order to distinguish the original genetics from other companies claiming to still breed them. White Widow became Black Widow, Great White Shark a.k.a. Peacemaker became Shark Shock, and White Rhino became Medicine Man.

As a prolific breeder and grower of cannabis and strains, Shantibaba began consulting for several farms and writing columns for cannabis magazines such as Dolce Vita and Treating Yourself.

== CBD research ==
in 2000, Blakey moved to Switzerland and set up large grows where he became the first person to cultivate strains of cannabis with high levels of cannabidiol (CBD) for commercial purposes. In 2009, Shantibaba co-founded the CBD crew as a collaboration between Mr. Nice Seedbank and Resin Seeds. CBD Crew was established for the purpose of researching and pioneering new strains in the medicinal cannabis field. CBD Crew is a science based cannabis seed breeding company that enriches cannabis in CBD and simultaneously reduces the THC concentration. Notable CBD strains include CBD Critical Mass, CBD Shark Shock, CBD Skunk Haze, and the CBD Therapy and CBD Yummy. CBD Crew was the very first CBD enriched seed company in the market, helping companies such as Dutch Passion to develop and stabilize their first CBD-rich strains.

In 2019, Shantibaba set up Sciva Corporation to further continue research and cultivation of cannabis in the pursuit of medical outcomes.
