= Schoenmaker =

Schoenmaker and Schoenmakers are Dutch occupational surnames meaning "shoemaker". People with these names include:

- Celinde Schoenmaker (born 1989), Dutch actress and singer
- Lex Schoenmaker (born 1947), Dutch football player and manager
- Michael Schoenmaker (born 1983), Dutch Paralympic swimmer
- Milo Schoenmaker (born 1967), Dutch politician (VVD)
- Nevil Schoenmakers (1956–2019), Australian botanist and cannabis breeder
- Ryan Schoenmakers (born 1990), Australian rules footballer
- Tatjana Schoenmaker (born 1997), South African swimmer
- Noraly Shoenmaker Motorcycle traveler, Author, Geologist

The name can also refer to:

- 5071 Schoenmaker, an asteroid
