= Platinum OG =

Strain of cannabis

- Genus: Cannabis
- Species: Cannabis indica dominant hybrid
- Breeder: Apothecary Genetics

Platinum OG is a 75/25 indica dominant hybrid bred by Apothecary Genetics. It is believed that it stems from the combination of Master Kush, OG Kush, and an unknown third strain – believed to be Purps strain. Its genetics mix makes Platinum OG a heavy strain which is an indicator for most strains of Kush origin. This strain is considered an impure indica.

== Cultivation ==
Platinum OG can be grown either indoors or outdoors requiring Mediterranean climate. The flowering time indoor is 9 weeks with a yield of 200-350 grams/sqm. Flowering outdoors usually is in early to mid October with a yield of 400-500 gm2. It grows to a medium height. It has an average THC level of 22%.

== Characteristics ==
The buds of this strain are medium-green and have a few orange hairs speckled throughout. The buds take a crystal appearance due to an abundance of trichromes, creating a dense, rock-like appearance when broken open. Despite the abundance of trichromes, this strain does not have the characteristic stickiness prevalent in most high-trichrome strains. Bud stems are darker than many marijuana strains and are covered in very long, thin hairs. Each bud has one to three leaf segments which are dark purple.

When used it causes a heady onset followed by physical sedation, making it more applicable for possible treatment of anxiety and pain. Some medical practitioners who believe in the medicinal effects of marijuana recommended this strain for sleeplessness and muscular pain.
