= AK-47 (disambiguation) =

The AK-47 is a Soviet assault rifle.

AK-47 may also refer to:

== Films ==
- A. K. 47 (1999 film), a Kannada-Telugu language bilingual Indian film
- AK-47 (2004 film), a Hindi language Indian film
- AK-47 (2020 film), a Russian film

== People ==
- Andrei Kirilenko (born 1981), Russian-American professional basketball player
- Aboubakar Kamara (born 1995), Mauritanian footballer
- Sandile Ndlovu (born 1980), South African football striker

== Other uses ==
- AK-47 (cannabis), a strain of cannabis
- USS Aquila (AK-47), a World War II cargo ship
- AK-47 (group), Russian rap group
- "AK-47", a 2009 song by Mack Maine

== See also ==
- AK-74, variant of the AK-47
