= AK-47 (cannabis) =

Cannabis strain

AK-47, also known simply as AK, is a cannabis strain with high THC content. It is a hybrid strain of cannabis that is sativa-dominant; it mixes Colombian, Mexican, Thai, and Afghan strains. A strong and popular strain, it has won multiple cannabis industry awards. The plant genetics of AK-47 have been studied scientifically.

== Naming ==
There is more than one explanation for the name of the strain. One, described by Joe Dolce in Brave New Weed, is that the letters "AK" stand for the breeder and 47 represents the number of days from planting to harvest. Another theory is that it is named after the AK-47 assault rifle. One author says flatly the name "has nothing to do with the AK-47 machine gun" and speculates it may stand for Afghan Kush and the suffix coming from the initial Dutch growers' tracking system. Yet another theory is that it describes the potency. A marijuana review in Way of Leaf said that the name is appropriate because of how powerful the strain is, with its mix of strong strains and its high content of THC and fair level of CBD. It did note that the flavor is sweet and delicate, unlike an assault rifle, writing that it "is as powerful as a gunshot in potency — but not in how it makes you feel". Westword's cannabis column instead felt that despite being "named after one of the most widely used killing machines on the planet, this strain is much more gentle than you'd imagine".

== History ==
AK-47 cannabis was developed in the Netherlands by Serious Seeds in 1992, but may have been bred as early as the 1970s, and is said to exemplify the good quality cannabis strains from the 1990s. It is a hybrid of Cannabis sativa and Cannabis indica, according to writer Ed Rosenthal in the ratio 65:35, and 50:50 according to physician Rav Ivker. The strain has won awards as both a "sativa" and as an "Indica", perhaps the only cannabis to have done so. It mixes Colombian, Mexican, Thai, and Afghan strains. The Colombian, Mexican and Thai strains are all sativa, with the Afghan contributing the indica in the hybrid. By 2020, it had won sixteen awards, including the High Times Cannabis Cup and the Best Sativa award at the 2011 Toronto Treating Yourself Expo; it is a popular strain of cannabis.

== Derived strains and phenotypes ==
The strain has been combined with the White Widow strain to produce White Russian cannabis, a plant with "a pleasantly sweet aroma" and a "long lasting effect".

The Chronic strain of cannabis is a cross of AK-47 with Northern Lights and Skunk #1.

The Cherry AK phenotype is occasionally produced by AK-47 plants.
