= Ganja =

Name for the cannabis plant

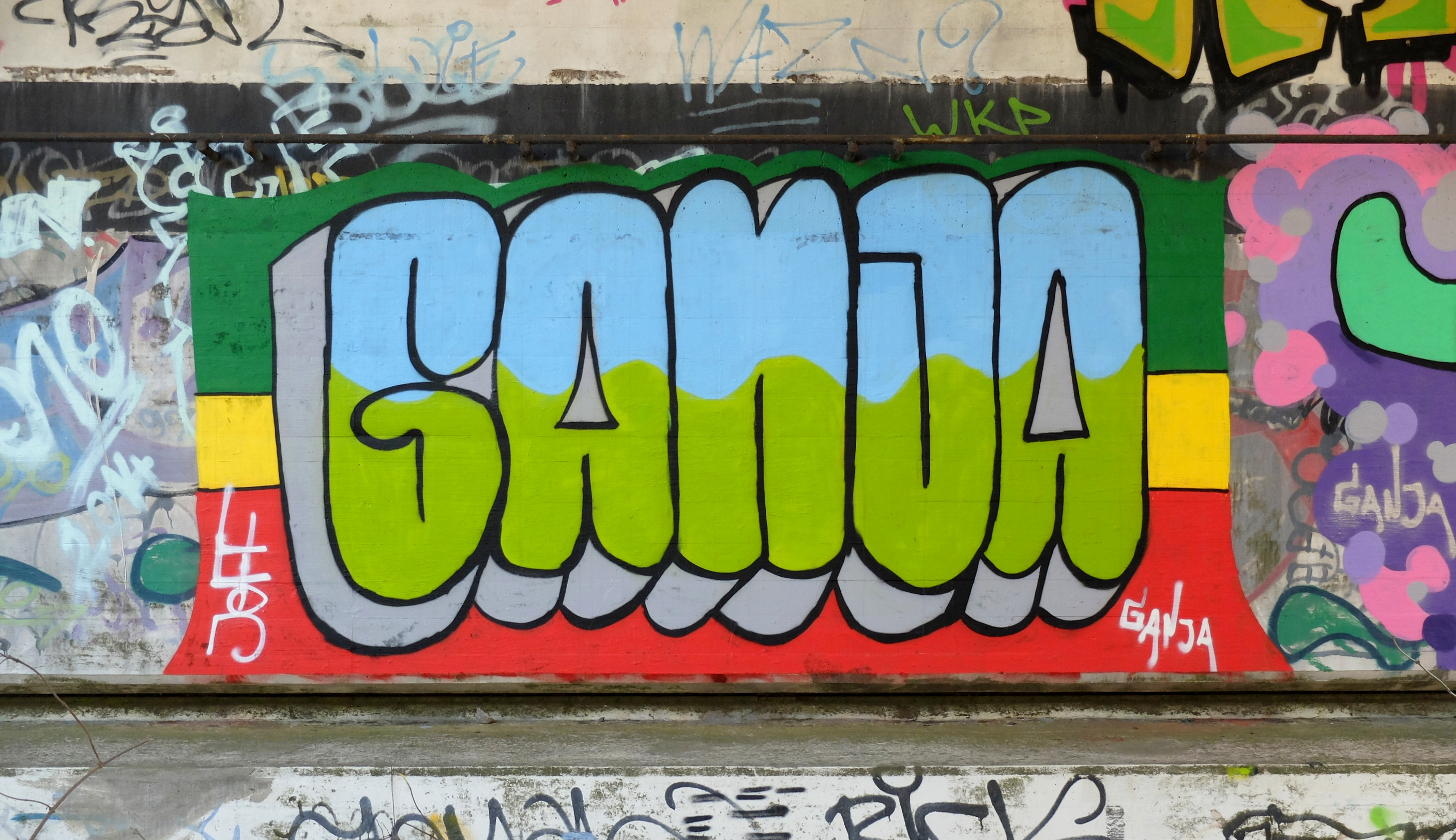
The word ganja written in graffiti in Seville, Spain.

Ganja pronunciation (a)
Sound of the word being spoken in Swahili by a Kenyan.

Ganja pronunciation (b)
Sound of the word being spoken by a German native.

Ganja pronunciation (c)
Sound of the word being spoken by a French native.

Ganja pronunciation (d)
Sound of the word being spoken by a Brazilian.

Ganja or ganjah (/ˈɡɑːndʒə/, UK: /ˈɡændʒə/; Hindi pronunciation: [ɡaːɲd͡ʒaː]) is one of the oldest and most commonly used synonyms for cannabis flower, specifically marijuana or hashish. Its usage in English dates to before 1689, borrowed from Hindi and Sanskrit gāñjā.

== Etymology ==
Ganja is borrowed from Hindi gāñjā (Hindi: गांजा, IPA: [ɡaːɲd͡ʒaː]), a name for cannabis in the Indo-Aryan language that descended from an early form of Vedic Sanskrit. The Sanskrit gañjā refers to a "powerful preparation from Cannabis sativa". But the word only refers to a certain product derived from cannabis plants. Gāñjā is the title given to the flowers, whereas “charas” refers to the resin, and “bhang” the seeds and leaves.

The word ganja reached the Western world through victims of slavery. Victims of the Atlantic slave trade were brought from Africa to Jamaica in 1513. In 1845, the British Empire started to call for indentured Indians to come to the Caribbean to strengthen the workforce on sugar plantations. They brought with them elements of their culture, including ganja.

One academic source places the date of introduction of ganja in Jamaica at 1845. The term came with 19th century workers whose descendants are now known as Indo-Jamaicans.

The word was used in Europe as early as 1856, when the British enacted a tax on the "ganja" trade.

In 1913, Jamaica banned cannabis with the Ganja Law.

== Contemporary use of the term ganja ==
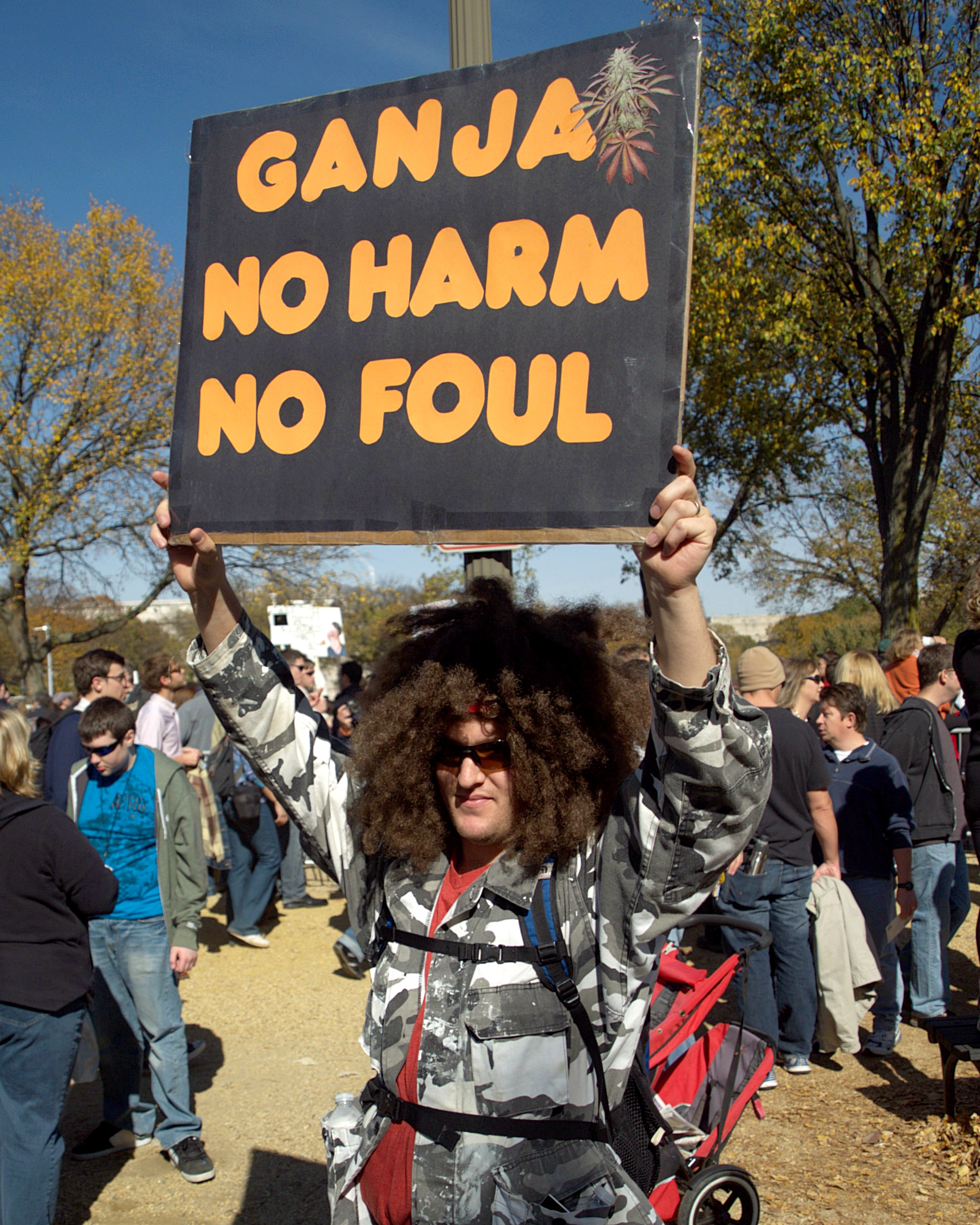
The word ganja on a "No Harm No Foul" sign at a 2010 Washington, D.C., political demonstration.

=== English use ===
Ganja is the most common term for marijuana in the Caribbean brought by the Indian indentured laborers.

=== In popular culture ===
Cultural figureheads such as Bob Marley popularized Rastafari and ganja through reggae music. In 1976, Peter Tosh defended the use of ganja in the song "Legalize It". The hip-hop group Cypress Hill revived the term in the United States in 2004 in a song titled "Ganja Bus", followed by other artists, including rapper Eminem, in the 2009 song "Must Be the Ganja".

== In other languages ==
Derivatives of the term are used as generic words for marijuana in several languages, such as Indonesian/Malay (ganja), Khmer (កញ្ឆា, kanhchha), Lao (ກັນຊາ, kan sa), Thai (กัญชา, gancha), Tiwi (kanja), and Vietnamese (cần sa).
