= Etymology of cannabis =

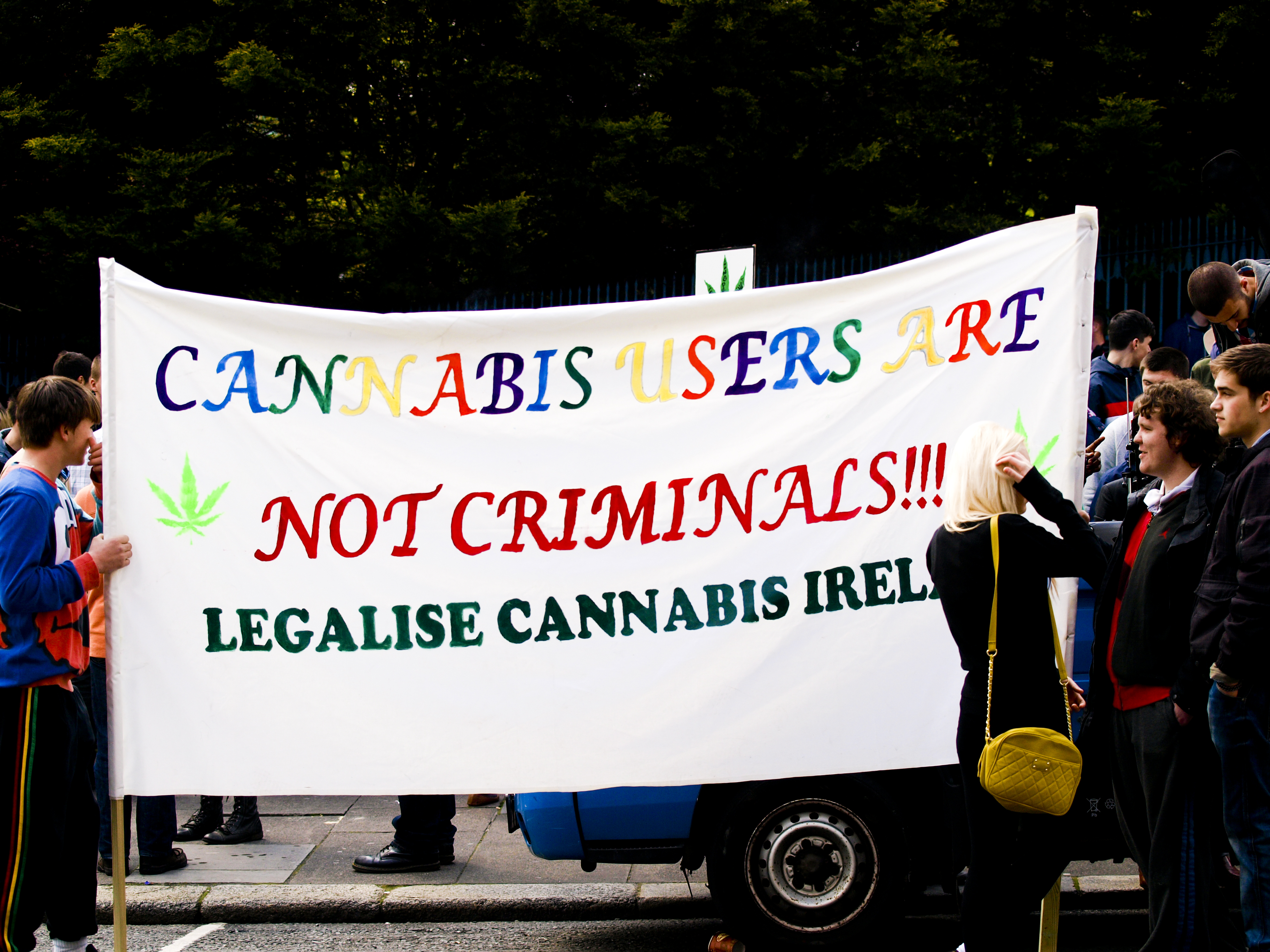
The word cannabis on a banner carried in a 2012 pro-legalization march in Dublin, Ireland.

The plant name cannabis is a Scythian word, which was loaned into Persian as kanab, then into Greek as κάνναβις (kánnabis) and subsequently into Latin as cannabis. The ancient Greeks learned of the use of cannabis by observing Scythian funerals, during which cannabis was consumed. In Neo-Assyrian Akkadian, cannabis was known as qunnabu (𒋆𒄣𒌦𒈾𒁍). Some scholars relate this to qaneh bosem (קָנֶה בֹּשׂם). The Germanic word that gives rise to English hemp (Old English hænep, Common Germanic *hanapi-z) may be an early Germanic loan (predating Grimm's law) from the same source.

== Word history ==
The Oxford English Dictionary records the earliest usages of cannabis meaning the plant "common hemp Cannabis sativa" - in 1548, and meaning - parts of the plant "smoked, chewed, or drunk for their intoxicating or hallucinogenic properties" - in 1848. The OED traces the etymology to the Neo-Latin botanical term cannabis – proposed in 1728 and standardized in Carl Linnaeus's (1753) Species Plantarum – from an earlier Latin cannabis, coming from Greek kánnabis.

Herodotus (c. 440 BCE) recorded the use of cannabis in The Histories. "The Scythians, as I said, take some of this hemp-seed [presumably, flowers], and, creeping under the felt coverings, throw it upon the red-hot stones; immediately it smokes, and gives out such a vapour as no Grecian vapour-bath can exceed; the Scyths, delighted, shout for joy."

== Indo-European etymologies ==
Based upon the botany, archeology, and linguistic history of cannabis, Elizabeth Wayland Barber concluded,

People all across the middle latitudes of Europe and Asia – and that would include the early Indo-Europeans (IE's) – knew and were using hemp since 5000 B.C. So when IE groups started borrowing a new word four millennia later, it had to have been for a new use: drugs. The old northern varieties of hemp did not contain the cannabinoid THC; and the 2nd millennium was probably the first time that enough people were travelling back and forth between Iran (where it grew) and eastern Europe that they could spread a habit, along with its source, the THC-bearing hemp. And the early 1st-millennium B.C. is just when we begin to find evidence for pot-smoking in the new zone.

Barber analyzed cognate words for "hemp" and "cannabis" in Indo-European languages, and proposed an etymological root of *kan(n)aB- (where *B represents a *p or *b bilabial stop). A reconstructed Proto-Indo-European (PIE) *p is evident in many IE subgroups:

- Albanian (kanëp)
- Armenian (kanap)
- Baltic languages (Lithuanian kanãpė, Latvian kaņepe, and Old Prussian knapios)
- Some Finnic languages (Ingrian kaneppi and Estonian kanep) have borrowed the word from Baltic.
- Romanian (cânepă)
- Slavic languages (Russian konopljá, Croatian konoplja, Bulgarian konop, and Czech konopí)

Words in Germanic languages (Old English hænep, Old Norse hampr, and German der Hanf) go back to *hanap-, which by Grimm's Law would come from a *kanab- form, but this loanword preceded Romano-Germanic culture. A reconstructed PIE *b is evident in Latin cannabis (Vulgar Latin *can(n)abum, *canaba) from Greek kannabis, the earliest recorded term for the drug, which transcribed a Scythian or Thracian word. The Scythians spoke Iranian dialects, and Indo-Iranian languages have two words, represented by Sanskrit śaṇa- "a kind of hemp" (from *kana- or *kene- forms) and bhanga "narcotic hemp" (cf. bhang). From the Uralic and Turkic languages, Barber cited Mari kene or kine "hemp", Chuvash kantär, Old Turkish käntir, Turkish kendir and kenevir, and Karakalpak kenep. Further corroboration comes from 1st millennium BCE Neo-Assyrian cuneiform texts, "where a word qunabu (qunnapu, qunubu, qunbu) begins to turn up, for a source of oil, fiber and medicine."

Thus, Barber's well-researched hypothesis involves two stages: in the late Palaeolithic and early Neolithic, a *ken- or *kan- name spread across Asia with the hemp plant, which was used for fiber and food; then in the early Iron Age, "an enlarged version of this very word, local to Iran and perhaps northern India…spread with the drug-bearing variety."

Michael Witzel suggests an ultimate derivation of both *kana and *bhang from the language(s) of the Bactria–Margiana Archaeological Complex.

== Semitic etymologies ==
Semitic anthropologist Sula Benet, of the Institute of Anthropological Sciences in Warsaw, has indicated the origin to be the Hebrew word קַנַּבּוֹס (qannabbôs) kaneh bosm (קנה בושם). Benet, (also known as Sara Benetowa) is quoted saying:

The astonishing resemblance between the Semitic kanbos and the Scythian cannabis lead me to suppose that the Scythian word was of Semitic origin. These etymological discussions run parallel to arguments drawn from history. The Iranian Scythians were probably related to the Medes, who were neighbors of the Semites and could easily have assimilated the word for hemp. The Semites could also have spread the word during their migrations through Asia Minor.
Benet — in Book of Grass

Benet's earlier theory of a Semitic origin for cannabis was never widely accepted, and it is generally believed that the word was brought by Iranian traders, either Scythian or Assyrian, both of whom had a presence in Palestine.

The word 'gan-zi-gun-nu' is referenced from stone tablets (dating 700 BCE) that indicate a connection with eastern and near-eastern terms for the plant (gan-zi > ganja, gun-nu > qaneh). This substance was used for witchcraft and prescribed as a useful remedy for a variety of ailments including depression and impotence.

Hebrew קַנַּבּוֹס (qannabbôs) from קְנֵה בֹּשֶׂם (qěnēh bośem) may derive from Sumerian kunibu, though the final -s does not seem to be present in Akkadian (Assyrian) or Sumerian forms. Leading authorities on the etymology of both the German and Russian languages list a Sumerian cognate.

Raphael Mechoulam and co-workers at the Hebrew University of Jerusalem suggest an alternative etymology for cannabis: Greek cannabis < Arabic kunnab < Syriac qunnappa < Hebrew pannag (= bhanga in Sanskrit and bang in Persian). They explain that in Hebrew, only the consonants form the basis of a word and the letters p and b are frequently interchangeable. The authors think it probable that 'pannag', mentioned in the Bible by the prophet Ezekiel (27:17), is in fact Cannabis. The Biblical Hebrew term qěnēh bośem, literally "aromatic reed" (qěnēh- "reed", bośem- "aromatic"), probably refers to cannabis according to some etymologists, but is more commonly thought to be lemon grass, calamus, or even sweet cane, due to widespread translation issues. The Hebrew Bible mentions it in Exodus 30:23-24 where God commands Moses to make a holy oil of myrrh, cinnamon, qěnēh bośem and cassia to anoint the Ark of the Covenant and the Tabernacle (and thus God's Temple in Jerusalem). Notably, this anointing oil is a special herbal formula that functions as a kind of polish and fragrance for the Ark and Tabernacle, and the Bible forbids its manufacture and use to anoint people (Exodus 30:31–33) with the exception of the Aaronic priesthood (Exodus 30:30).

Elsewhere, the Hebrew Bible simply uses "reed" qānēh as the name of a plant in four places whose context seems to mean "reed of balm" as a fragrant resin, Isaiah 43:24, Jeremiah 6:20, Ezekiel 27:19 and Song of Songs 4:14. The Hebrew name "reed of balm" comes from qěnēh (the noun construct form of qāneh) means a "reed" or "cane" and bośem means "balm" or "aromatic" resin. Hebrew may have adapted the name qannabbôs from "reed of balm" qěnēh bośem as a substitute for the ambiguous name "reed".

Unambiguous Hebrew or Aramaic references to cannabis are rare and obscure. Syriac has qanpa (a loan from kannabis) and tanuma (see the Comprehensive Aramaic Lexicon.) but neither is found in the Peshitta, the Syriac Bible. Late Syriac Ahiqar texts include qanpa as "ropes of hemp" (tunbei de-qanpa). The Hebrew word qanbes, a loan word from kannabis, is used in the Mishnah as hemp [Kilaim 2:5; 5:8; 9:1,7; Negaim 11:2] in the sense of a constituent of clothing or other items.

Cannabis was a common material among the Hebrews. The hempen frock called "Simlah" in Hebrew was worn as a mark of the lowly. The International Standard Bible Encyclopedia also asserts the following:

- "The usual material for ropes was certainly flax (hemp)"
- That the cloth for tents called bait sha`r, meaning "house of hair" were stretched over poles by ropes of goats hair or hemp.
- "The poorer classes probably wore wrappers made either of unbleached flax or hemp" (the hempen, again, being the Simlah).

And cannabis has been found on the altars at the ancient holy of holies in Tel Arad.

== See also ==
- Cannabis
- Marijuana (word)
- List of names for cannabis
