= White Widow (cannabis) =

Strain of cannabis

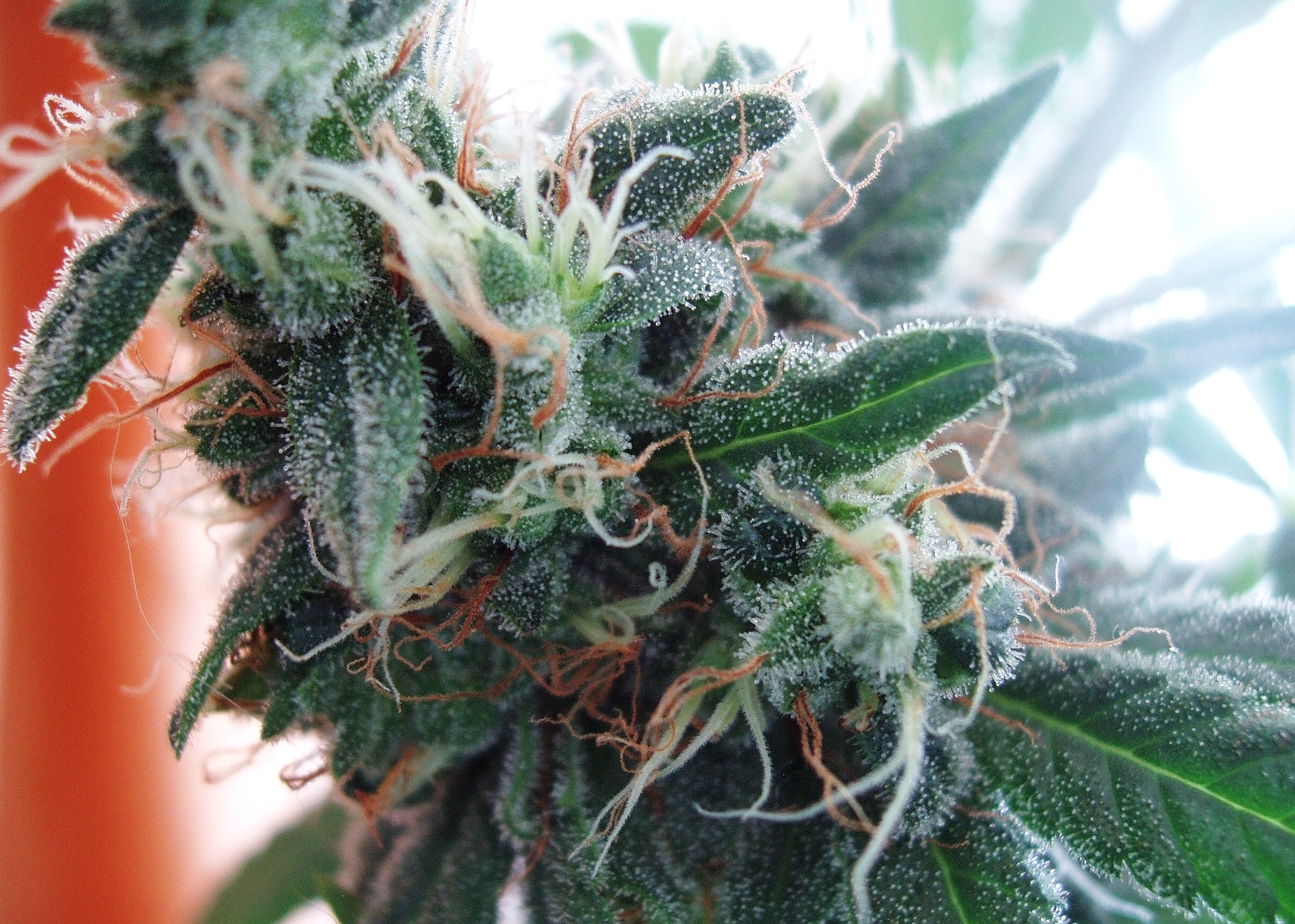
- White Widow bud
- Genus: Cannabis
- Species: Cannabis indica / Cannabis sativa balanced hybrid
- Hybrid parentage: Brazilian Sativa × South Indian Indica
- Origin: Netherlands

White Widow is a balanced hybrid strain of Cannabis indica and Cannabis sativa that was created and developed by Scott Blakey (Shantibaba) whilst he worked at the Greenhouse Seed Company.

White Widow has been described as "among the most popular [strains] in the world" by Popular Science magazine. The strain won the Cannabis Cup in 1995.

== Related strains ==
- Black Widow - the renamed original white widow when Shantibaba moved his genetics to Mr. Nice Seedbank.
- White Russian – An indica-dominant hybrid, that is a cross of White Widow and AK-47.
- Blue Widow - A sativa-dominant (60%) hybrid, that is a cross of White Widow and Blueberry.
- Moby Dick - A sativa-dominant (60%) hybrid, that is a cross of White Widow and Haze.

== See also ==
- Cannabis strains
- Medical cannabis
- Glossary of cannabis terms
- List of cannabis strains
