= Nevil Schoenmakers =

Australian cannabis breeder

Nevil Martin Schoenmakers (2 February 1956 – 30 March 2019) was an Australian-born cannabis breeder known for founding the first cannabis seedbank, which was called "The Seed Bank of Holland", in the early 1980s in the Netherlands. This was also the first seed company to advertise directly to the public in High Times magazine.

== Biography ==
Schoenmakers was born in Perth, Western Australia to Dutch parents, Schoenmakers moved to the Netherlands in 1976. There he started growing cannabis for personal use. He soon discovered that the commercially available Thai, Colombian and African strains did not perform well in the Netherlands's northern European climate, nor indoors under artificial lighting. Realizing that the solution to the problem was better genetics, he decided that the best way to obtain good genetics was to start a seed bank, and in 1984 Schoenmakers established "The Seedbank." It was around this time that he met David Paul Watson, a cannabis collector and breeder from California better known as "Sam the Skunkman." Schoenmakers was able to purchase from Watson seeds of the premier Californian varieties "Original Haze", "Skunk #1", "Early Girl" and "California Orange." From then on, Schoenmakers collected many other potent cannabis strains from various breeders which he crossed to create his own strains. In the process he was able to cross equatorial sativas with Afghani indicas to create strains that were more suited to the temperate climates and indoor growing mediums of his European and U.S. customers. By 1986, Schoenmakers's cannabis seed company had become a runaway success with sales to more than 15,000 different growers in the United States alone.

In 1990 Schoenmakers became a target of the DEA Operation Green Merchant because it was illegal to ship seeds from the Netherlands to the US. An indictment had been lodged in New Orleans, charging him with the sale of marijuana seeds to undercover agents and indoor growers in the New Orleans area. On 24 July 1990, he was arrested by the Australian authorities at the request of the U.S. government while visiting family in Perth. Schoenmakers was incarcerated in Fremantle jail for almost a year without bail while awaiting his extradition hearing. On 21 June 1991, just weeks before the date of his Federal Court hearing, he was finally granted bail and subsequently disappeared from Australia. For some time after Schoenmakers's return to the Netherlands, he was on the FBI's most wanted list, but because his activities were legal under Dutch law his extradition was refused and the charges were ultimately dropped. In 1991 Schoenmakers sold The Seed Bank to Sensi Seeds where he worked for a short time as their head breeder, before founding the Greenhouse Seed company with Arjan Roskam. By 1998, already widely regarded as the most successful modern cannabis breeder with multiple High Times Cannabis Cup wins, Schoenmakers sold his share of Greenhouse Seeds and left the limelight to focus on other interests.

Later in life Schoenmakers became involved with the movement to legalise medicinal cannabis in Australia. He coauthored a submission to a NSW government inquiry into the matter. Nevil Schoenmakers died on 30 March 2019 after a fight with cancer.

== In popular culture ==
Schoenmakers was described by High Times magazine in 1985 as the "King of Cannabis". he was the first cannabis breeder to export cannabis seeds from the Netherlands to the rest of the world, and is credited with creating many of the most popular award winning strains, such as Nevil's Haze, Northern Lights Haze, Super Silver Haze, Nevil's Skunk, Super Skunk, Silver Pearl, Silver Haze and many others. His breeding with Northern Lights, a mostly Indica strain originally developed in the Pacific Northwest of the United States, became an inspiration for indoor Indicas, and the Northern Lights genetics are found in the pedigrees of nearly all of the best modern Indica lines. He is best remembered for the F1 hybrid Northern Lights 5 X Haze. This hybrid and its daughters have dominated the Cannabis Cup from the 1980s to the present day. The original Northern Lights 5 X Haze plant of Nevil's has been living on through clones and still wins championship awards. It is this cross that led to many of the modern medicinal strains that are popular today.
