= Marijuana (word) =

Name for the cannabis plant

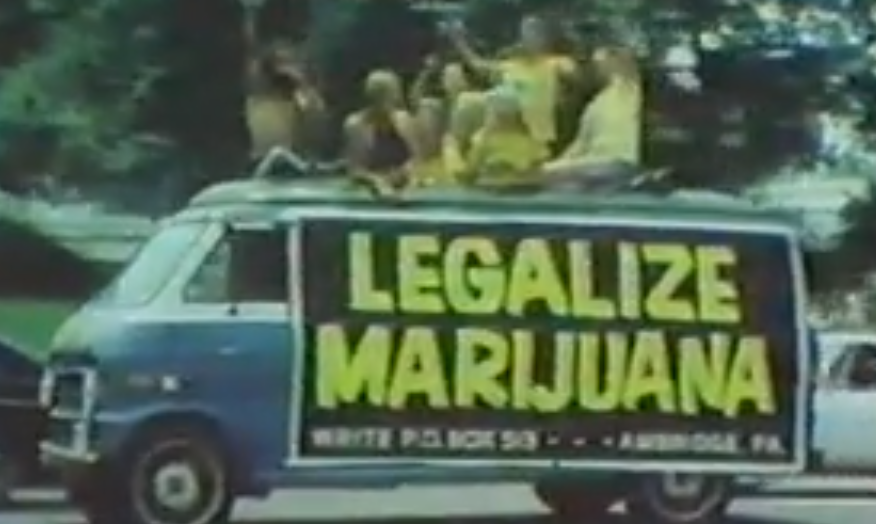
The word marijuana on a Yippie banner passing by the July 4th Smoke-in, Lafayette Park, Washington, D.C., 1977.

Marijuana, or marihuana, is a name for the cannabis plant, specifically, a drug preparation from it. "Marijuana" as a term varies in usage, definition and legal application throughout the world. Some jurisdictions define "marijuana" as the whole cannabis plant or any part of it, while others refer to "marijuana" as a portion of the cannabis plant that contains high levels of tetrahydrocannabinol (THC). Some jurisdictions recognize "marijuana" as a distinctive strain of cannabis, the other being hemp. For legal, research and statistical reference, "marijuana" generally refers to only the dried leaves and flowering tops (herbal cannabis), with by-products such as hashish or hash oil being uniquely defined and regulated. A variety of theories have been postulated for origins of the term marijuana.

== Etymology ==
Historically spelled variously as "marihuana" or "mariguana", that is believed to have originated in Mexican Spanish in its current form.

According to the Oxford English Dictionary, the term may come from the Nahuatl mallihuan, meaning "prisoner". Another explanation on the etymology of marijuana focused on Mexican traditional healers or herbalists who sold cannabis in street markets. These, mostly, women, were called “Marias.” This combined with the argot for the revolutionary troops, “Juanes,” resulting in the word “Marihuana" Author Martin Booth notes that this etymology was popularized by Harry J. Anslinger in the 1930s, during his campaigns against the drug. However, linguist Jason D. Haugen finds no semantic basis for a connection to mallihuan, suggesting that the phonetic similarity may be "a case of accidental homophony". Cannabis is not known to have been present in the Americas before Spanish contact, making an indigenous word an unlikely source.

Other suggestions trace the possible origins of the word to Chinese ma ren hua (麻仁花, lit. 'hemp seed flower'), possibly itself originating as a loan from an earlier semitic root *mrj "hemp". The Semitic root is also found in the Spanish word mejorana and in English marjoram, which could be related to the word marihuana. This is also known in Mexico as "Chinese oregano".

Additionally, traditional association with the personal name María Juana ('Mary Jane') is probably a folk etymology. The original Mexican Spanish used forms with the letter ⟨h⟩ (marihuana), and is famously used in the Mexican Revolutionary era (1910–1920) version of the lyrics of La Cucaracha. Forms using the letter ⟨j⟩ (marijuana) seem to be an innovation of English, and their later appearance in French and Spanish are probably due to English influence.

Chris S. Duvall, an associate professor of geography at the University of New Mexico, provided a different theory of the word's etymology in 2015 on the website The Conversation:

The origin of the word "marijuana" foreshadowed its current use. Historically, the earliest and most numerous group of users in the Americas were slaves from western Central Africa (modern Gabon to Angola). Their words for cannabis are now used in nearly all the places they (involuntarily) ended up during the 1700s and 1800s, which includes West Africa, the Caribbean and South America. Most notably, in Central America, the Kimbundu (Angolan) word mariamba became the Spanish word marihuana.

The word "marijuana" as we know it today did not appear until 1846 in Farmacopea Mexicana, though it was spelled "mariguana". In most following instances, the word was spelled marihuana. In Chilean Spanish, mariguanza is the dance of a shaman in an altered state of consciousness.

== English use ==
=== Early use of the term marijuana ===
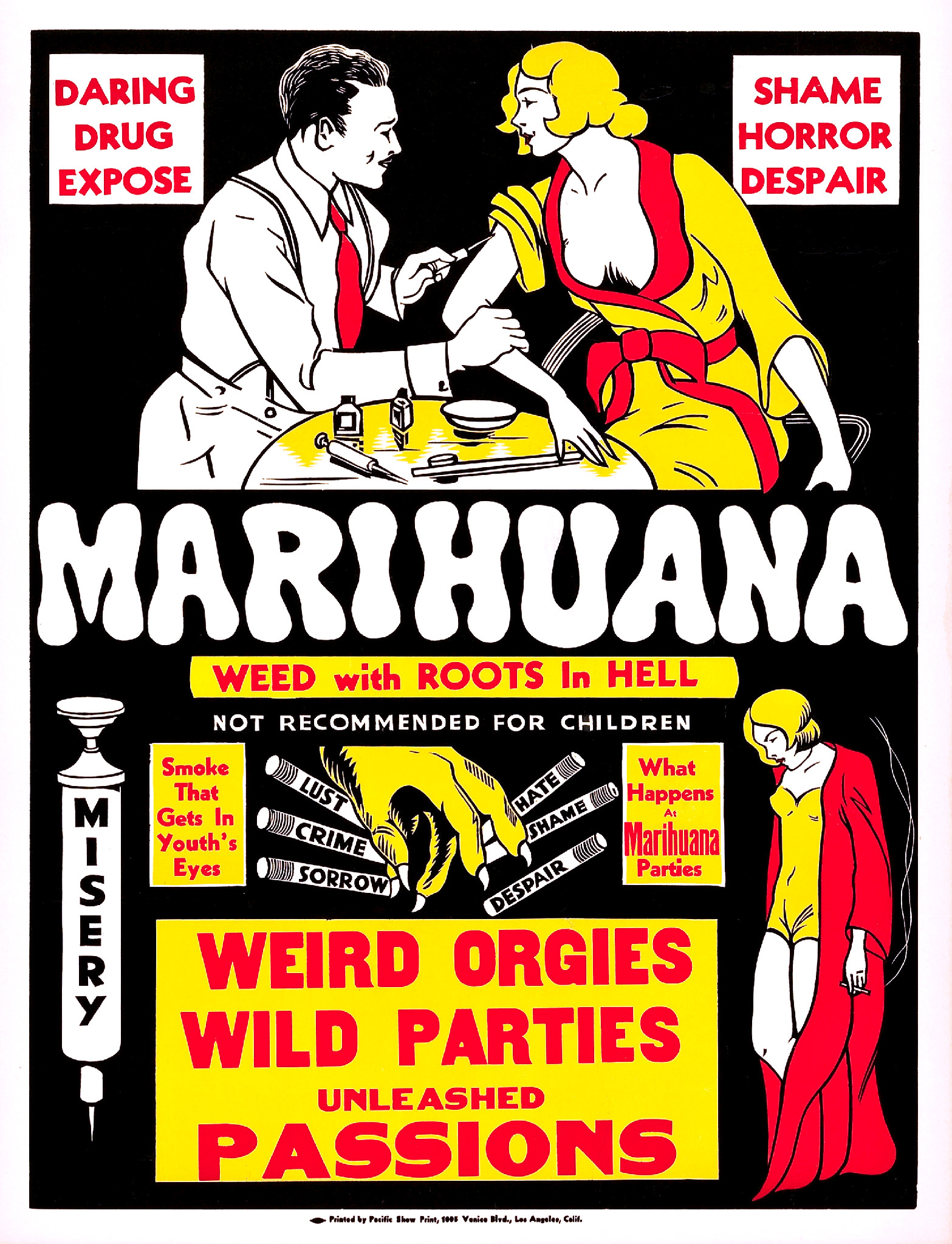
The word marihuana used in the title of a 1936 drug exploitation film

The word entered English usage in the late 19th century. According to the Oxford English Dictionary, the first known appearance of a form of the word in English is in Hubert Howe Bancroft's 1873 The Native Races of the Pacific States of North America. Other early variants include "mariguan" (1894), "marihuma" first recorded in 1905, "marihuano" in 1912, and "marahuana" in 1914. According to the second edition of Webster's New International Dictionary, the word originally denoted a wild species of South American tobacco, Nicotiana glauca.

The use of "marihuana" in American English increased dramatically in the 1930s, when it was preferred as a "foreign-sounding name" to stigmatize it during debates on the drug's use. The word was codified into law and became part of common American English with the passing of the Marihuana Tax Act of 1937.

=== Formal usage ===
Many legal references prefer the term "cannabis", for instance in the Single Convention on Narcotic Drugs. However, many laws and regulations often use the term "marihuana" or "marijuana", for instance the Controlled Substances Act in the United States. Some cannabis reform organizations, such as the National Organization for the Reform of Marijuana Laws and Marijuana Policy Project, alongside political organizations like Legal Marijuana Now Party of United States and the Marijuana Party of Canada, also use this term.

== See also ==
- Etymology of cannabis
- List of names for cannabis
