= Milo Schoenmaker =

Dutch politician

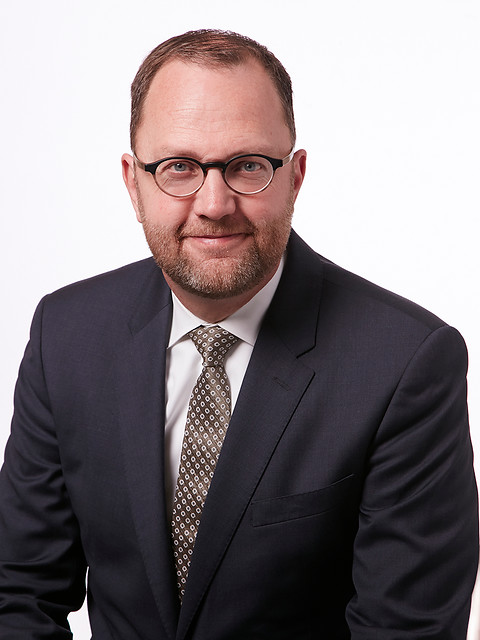

Milo Schoenmaker (born 17 November 1967 in Alkmaar) is a Dutch politician for the People's Party for Freedom and Democracy (VVD). He was Mayor of Gouda between 2012 and 2019. Since 15 January 2019 he is the chairman of the Centraal Orgaan opvang asielzoekers (COA), the Central Agency for the Reception of Asylum Seekers
