= Arjan Roskam =

Dutch breeder (born 1970)

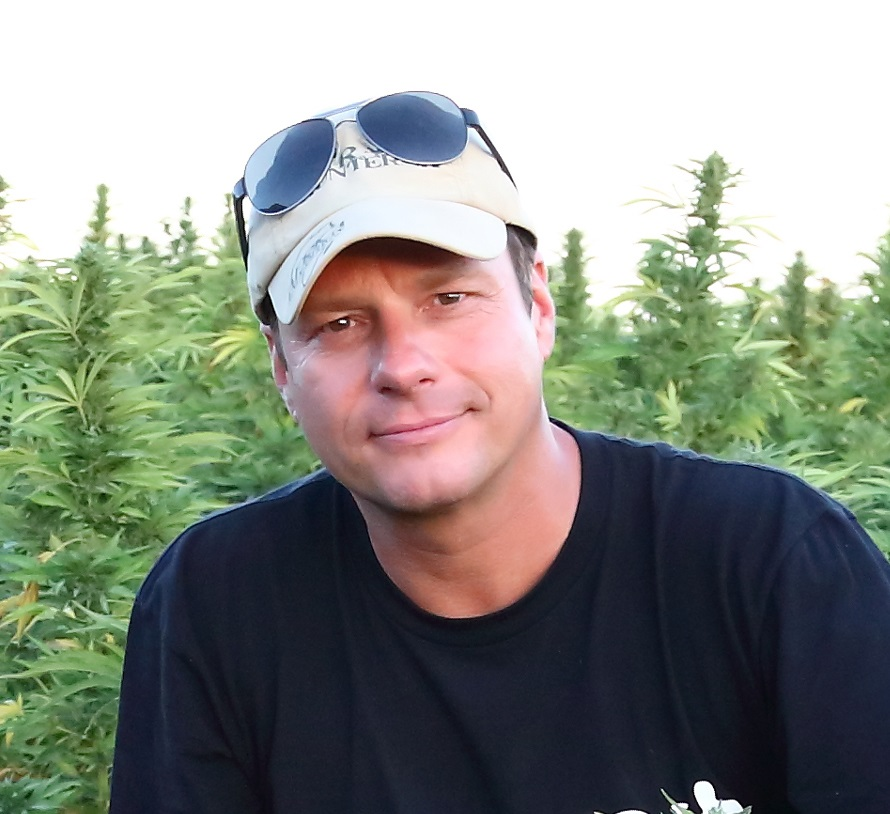
- Born: April 4, 1970 (age 56); South Africa
- Citizenship: Dutch
- Organization(s): Green House Coffeeshops, Green House Seed Company, Strain Hunters, Green House Feeding, Green House Kitchen, GH Medical, GH mental help
- Known for: Seeds salesman and marketer, Coffee Shops, The Strain Hunters documentary
- Notable work: Hawaiian Snow, Super Lemon Haze, Flowerbomb Kush and many more
- Title: self-touted "King of Cannabis"
- Partner: Rose Np
- Children: Dax, Storm, Celester, Loulou Roskam
- Awards: 32 Cannabis Cups
- Website: https://www.greenhouseseeds.nl

Arjan Roskam (born April 4, 1970) is a cannabis entrepreneur, the founder of Green House coffeeshops and co-founder of Green House Seed Company. Roskam is known being part of the team that bred the Super Lemon Haze cannabis strain by crossing Lemon Skunk with Super Silver Haze. Roskam is also known as the (self-appointed) "King of Cannabis". Others refer to him as the P.T. Barnum of Cannabis.

== Green House Seed Company ==
Together with Scott Blakey, Arjan Roskam co-founded the Green House Seed Company in Amsterdam in 1994 based on the seed collection Sam Skunkman brought with him upon his arrival in the Netherlands in 1984 including Skunk #1, Original Haze, Hindu Kush, Cali-O, Durban Poison, etc. In 1998, Blakey also known as "Shantibaba" sold his share of the company to Roskam, thus making him the sole owner of the firm.

Arjan's Haze #1 won the Cannabis Cup in 2006. Super Lemon Haze from the firm won the Cannabis Cup in 2008 and 2009. Arjan has been accused of paying off judges in prior cannabis cups.

== In media ==
=== Strain Hunters ===
In 2008, Roskam started a series of documentaries called Strain Hunters, in which he portrays to seek out rare or vulnerable landraces from around the world.

Roskam fell under public scrutiny since his claims of being involved in working and selecting world-famous Cannabis varieties known as "White Widow" and "Super Silver Haze", as well as his attempts to register trademark patents for popular Cannabis seed varieties. Roskam's claims largely contradict Scott Blakey's life story and work, who is widely believed to be the originator of world renowned varieties such as "White Widow", "Super Silver Haze" and many others.

=== National Geographic ===
Roskam appeared on the show Drugs, Inc., in the "Marijuana" Episode, in which he discussed his work in the Cannabis business.
