= Orange Bud =

Cannabis strain

Orange Bud is a 100% skunky cannabis strain. Growing with hard and thick tops, as well as orange pistils (hence its name), it has a THC level of 16.5%. It can be grown indoor or outdoors; the climate of Southern Europe is amenable to cultivation. The strain has been known since at least 2001. It has a citrus flavor that can be used to enhance cooking with cannabis.
