= Charas =

Hindi name for marijuana resin

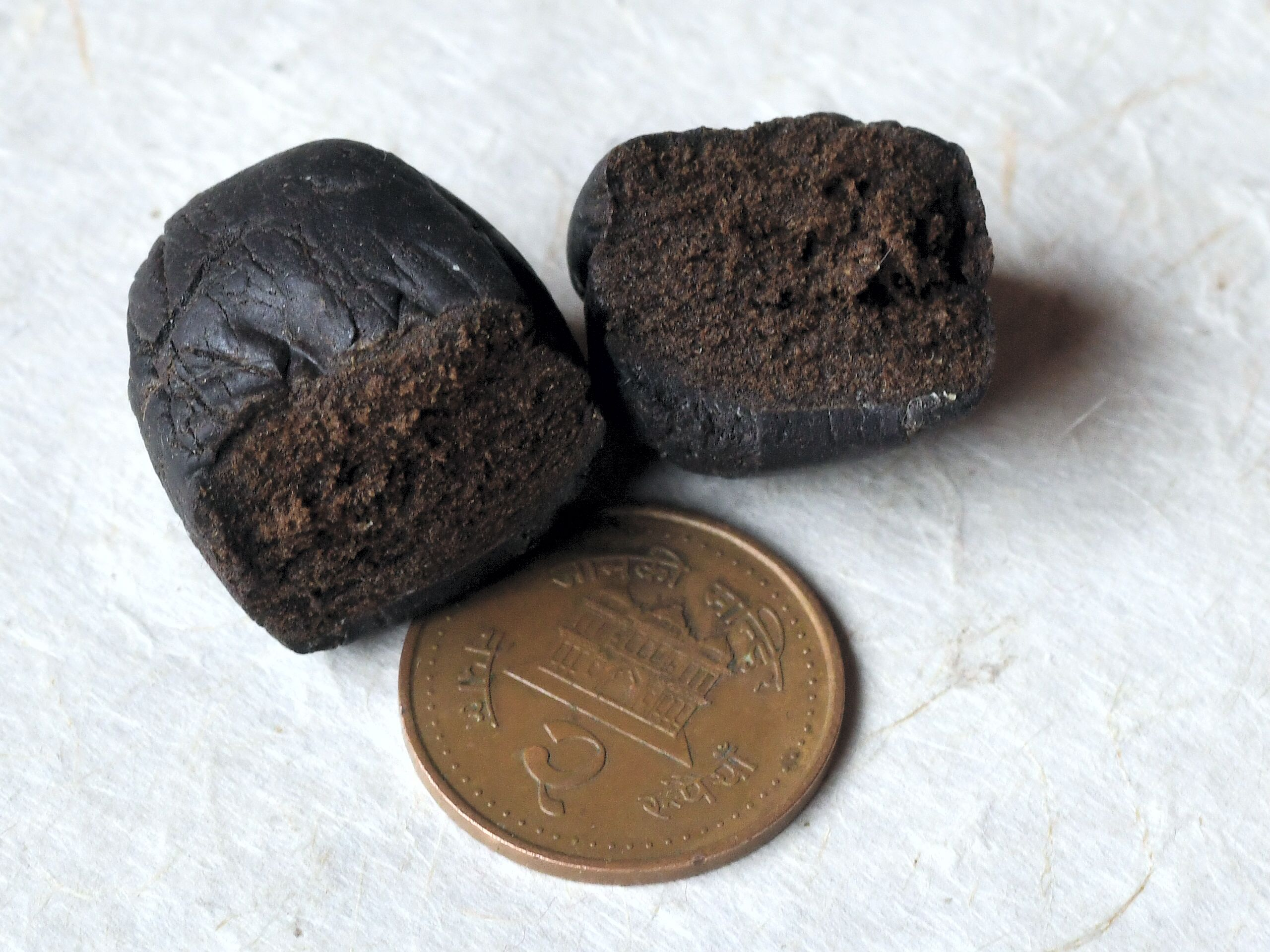
Nepalese charas (hashish)

Charas is a cannabis concentrate made from the resin of a live cannabis plant (Cannabis sativa either Indica subspecies or Sativa subspecies) and is handmade in the Indian subcontinent. The plant grows wild throughout Northern India along the stretch of the Himalayas (its putative origin) and is an important cash crop for the local people. The difference between charas and hashish is that hashish is made from a dead cannabis plant and charas is made from a live one.

== History ==
=== Indian subcontinent ===
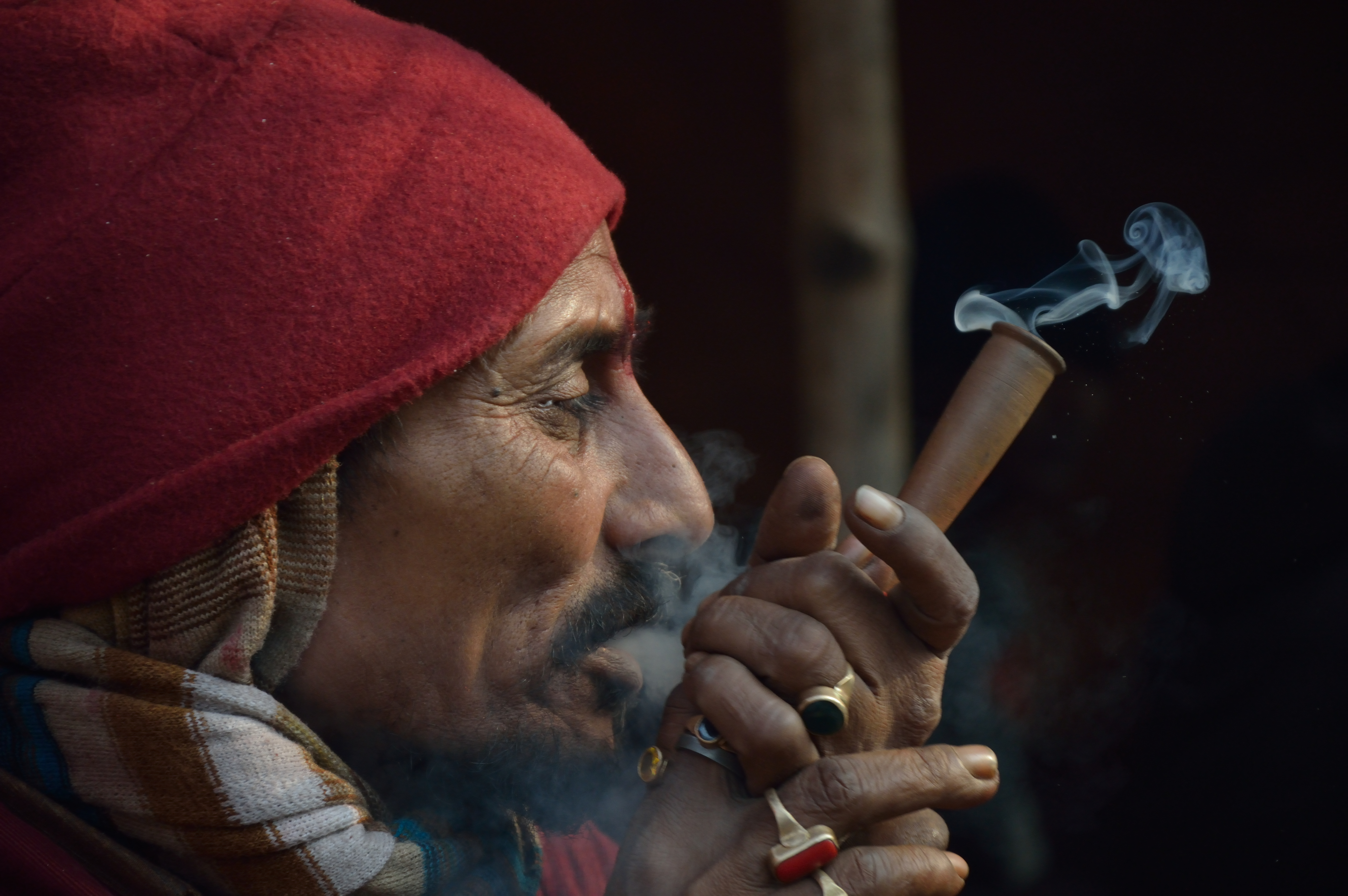
A man smoking a chillum in Kolkata, India

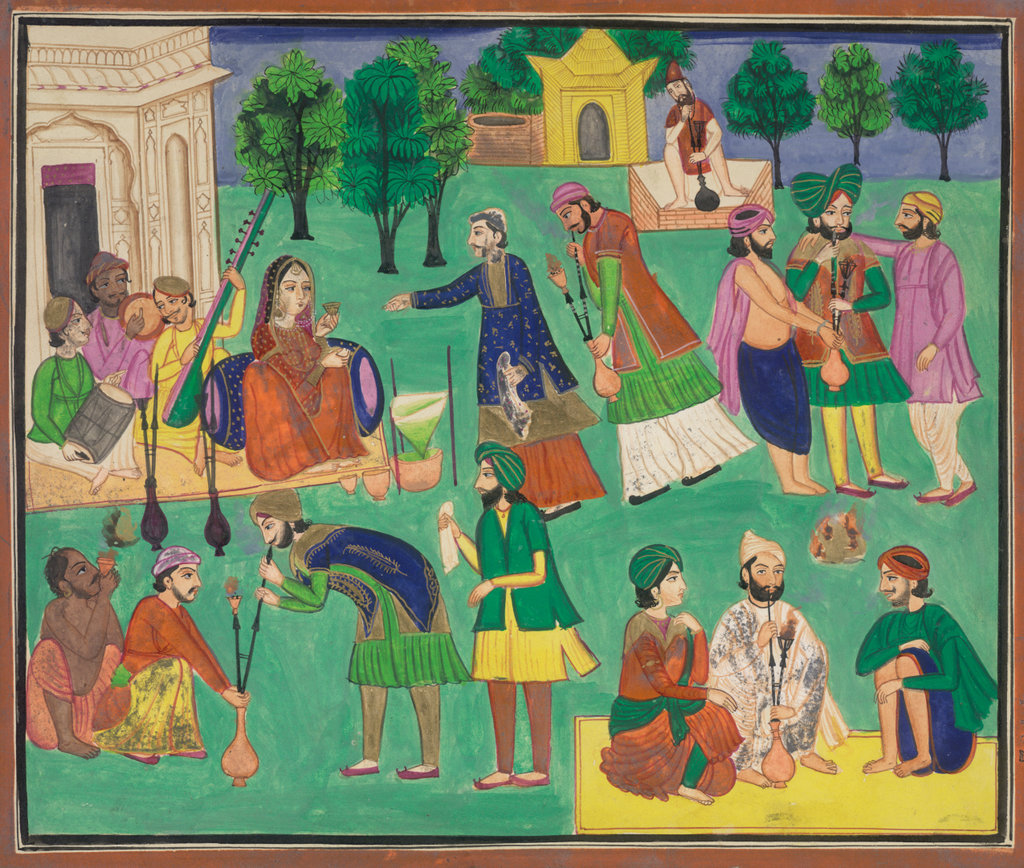
Gouache by an Amritsar artist depicting the smoking of Charas, a type of Indian hemp imported into Northern India from Eastern Turkestan, circa 1870

Charas has been used across the Indian subcontinent for medicinal and religious purposes for thousands of years, and was sold in government shops (along with opium) during the times of the British India and in independent India until the 1980s when sale and consumption of Cannabis was made illegal in the subcontinent.

Charas plays an important and often integral role in the culture and ritual of certain sects of the Hindu religion, especially among the Shaivas — who focus on the Shaivite traditions (in contrast to Vaishnavs who focus on Vaishnavite traditions) —and it is venerated by some as being one of the aspects of Lord Shiva.

Despite this long history, charas was made illegal in India under pressure from the United States in 1985 and cultivation and trafficking of charas was prohibited by the Narcotic Drugs and Psychotropic Substances Act (NDPS), 1985. Charas was also produced in Nepal and sold in government monopoly stores in Kathmandu until the use of cannabis, and consequently charas, was made illegal in Nepal due to international pressure in 1976.

Charas remains popular in the subcontinent and is often used by Indian sadhus for religious purposes. The Naga Sadhus, Aghoris and Tantric Bhairava sects smoke it freely as an integral part of their religious practice. Many smoke it in clay pipes called chillums, using a cotton cloth to cover the smoking end of the chillum and inserting a tightly packed pebble-sized cone of clay as filter under the chunk of charas. Before lighting the chillum they will chant the many names of Shiva in veneration. It is freely available in several places around India especially where there is a strong affluence of tourists. Although charas can be found in several places around India, its manufacturing can be traced only to specific locations in India such as, Parvati Valley, (Kasol, Rasol, Malana ("Malana cream"), Kashmir as well as several other places in northern India. There is also a large amount of charas that is illegally exported across to Europe.

== Cultivation and manufacture ==
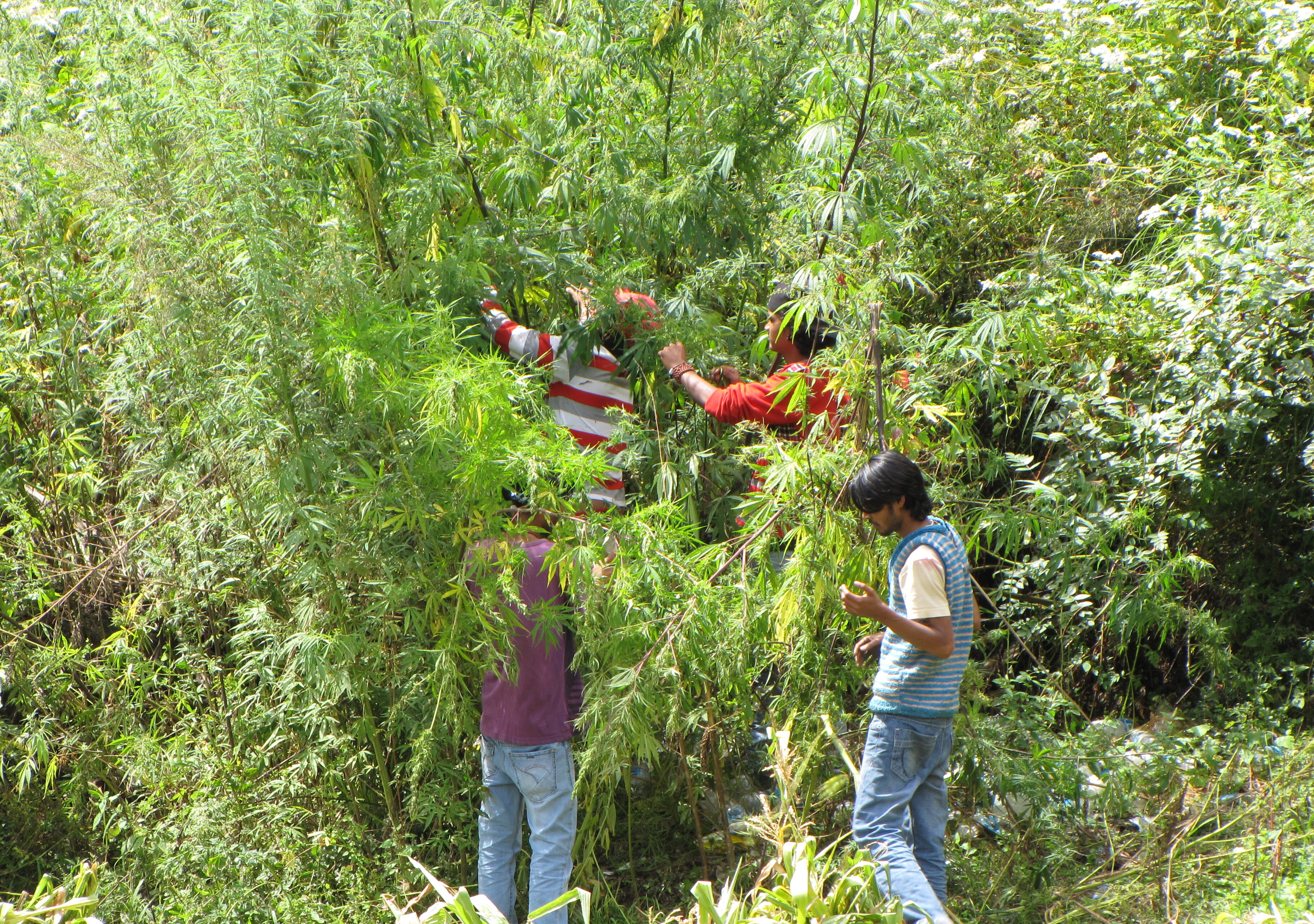
Local villagers make charas in India.

High quality charas in India comes from cannabis grown in the mountains, or that is smuggled in from Pakistan and Afghanistan. The variety from Himachal Pradesh especially of the upper Mahasu region is considered to be of the highest quality throughout India. It is easily available in Kinnaur, Shimla, Karsog, Kumarsain, Barot, Kullu-Malana and Rampur Bushahr. For this reason, the Indian subcontinent has become very popular with backpackers. During hand-harvesting, live cannabis plants' flowering buds (as opposed to dried plants/buds) are rubbed between the palms of the harvesters' hands to make charas.
