= Kush (cannabis) =

Strain of cannabis

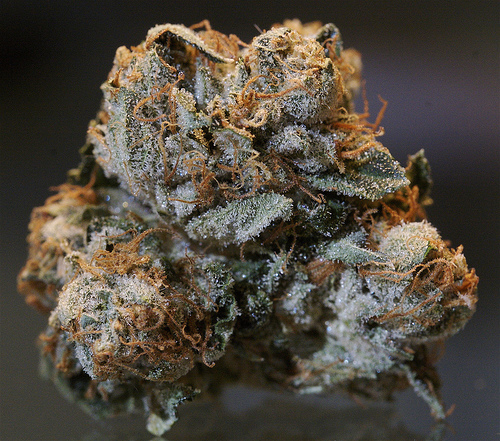
- A close up of dried "Bubba Kush" flowers.
- Genus: Cannabis
- Species: Cannabis indica
- Origin: Afghanistan

Kush generally refers to a pure or hybrid Cannabis indica strain. Pure C. indica strains include Afghani #1, Blackberry Kush aka Pakistani Chitral, Deep Chunk, Hindu Kush, Master Kush, Pink Kush and Purple Kush. 50/50 Hybrid strains of C. indica include OG Kush and Golden Jamaican Kush. The term "kush" is now also used as a slang word for cannabis.

== Distribution ==
The origins of Kush Cannabis are from heirloom drug varietal plants found in Pre Soviet Afghanistan, Pakistan, Northern India and Tajikistan These heirloom drug varietals coming from the Hindu Kush, Pamir and Tian Shan mountain range. Pre Soviet Afghan strains of Cannabis were taken to California in the early 1970s. Some Kush varieties are still available to the present day.

Popular kush strains include OG Kush, Bubba Kush, and Purple Kush.

== See also ==
- Medical cannabis
