= Hashish =

Compressed form of cannabis resin

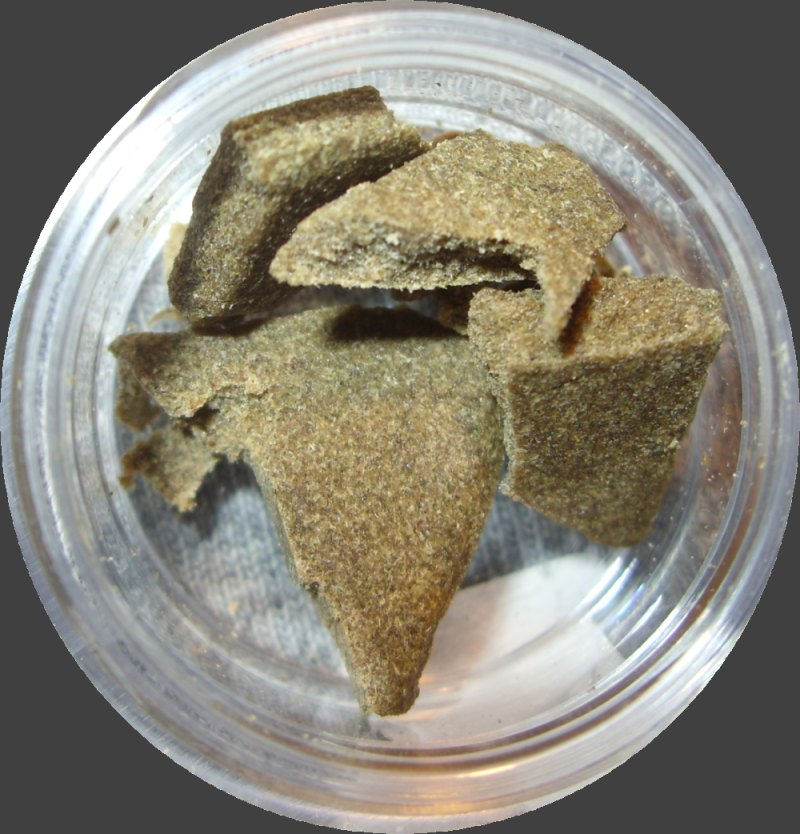
- 1.75 grams (1/16 oz) hashish
- Source plant(s): Cannabis indica, Cannabis sativa, Cannabis ruderalis (Note: Pure varieties of C. ruderalis are rarely used for recreational purposes (including as hashish) due to their negligible amounts of THC.)
- Part(s) of plant: Trichome
- Active ingredients: Tetrahydrocannabinol, cannabidiol, cannabinol, tetrahydrocannabivarin
- Legal status: AU: S8 (Controlled drug); CA: Unscheduled; DE: Anlage I (Authorized scientific use only); UK: Class B; US: Schedule I; UN: Narcotic Schedule I

Hashish (Arabic language:حَشِيش) (usually abbreviated as hash) (/həˈʃiːʃ/) or cannabis resin also charas (Note: example sources describing charas as being same: observation of difference is primarily because of differing production process, place of orign) is a cannabis concentrate made by collecting and drying resin from the plant’s trichomes, which are found primarily on its flowers but also on its leaves and stalks. The resin contains ingredients such as tetrahydrocannabinol (THC) and other cannabinoids, though often in higher concentrations than the unsifted or unprocessed cannabis flower. It is defined by the 1961 UN Single Convention on Narcotic Drugs (Schedule I and IV) as "the separated resin, whether crude or purified, obtained from the cannabis plant". The consistency and appearance of hashish is dependent on the manufacturing process. It is typically solid, though its consistency ranges from brittle to malleable. The color is most commonly light or dark brown, though may appear transparent, yellow, black, or red.

As a psychoactive substance, hashish is typically consumed by smoking or vaporizing, either plain or mixed with tobacco, but can also be consumed orally. It has a long history of use in countries such as Afghanistan, India, Pakistan, Iran, Iraq, Lebanon, Morocco, Nepal and Egypt, and also in Europe. In the United States, other cannabis products are more popular and legally available.

Purities of confiscated hashish in Europe (2011) range between 3% and 15%. Between 2000 and 2005, the percentage of hashish in cannabis end product seizures was at 18%.

== Etymology ==
"Hashish" usage in the English language developed from transliteration of the Arabic words ḥašīš or ḥashīsh (Arabic language:حَشِيشٌ), which meant dried grass, hemp, dry herbage; dry pasture, or fodder, or from حش ḥašša, which meant dried, dried up, or to mow.

There is no indication of "hashish" or any similar word in known Arabic language literature from the 9th or 10th centuries or earlier, and the term seems to have been first recorded about 1100. An early indication of the word "hashish" is an epistle of the tenth Fatimid caliph al-Āmir bi-Aḥkām Allāh circa 1123 CE stating "ḥashīshiyya" (Note: hashīshiyya is thought synonymous with assassins) (a transliteration) as a contradiction of Ismāʿīlī, using the suffix -iyya which is a way to make abstraction from a noun.

Oxford English Dictionary online states the their first evidence for the word "hashish" is 1598 in a translation of book one, volume two of The Voyage of John Huyghen Van Linschoten to the East Indies by Jan Huygen van Linschoten. In fact, the word is not found either in the original of 1596 or the 1598 translation, instead exists as an annotation in a 1885 edition edited by P.A. Thiele.

Like many recreational drugs, multiple synonyms and alternative names for hashish exist, and vary greatly depending on the country and native language.

== Usage history ==
Hashish has been consumed for many centuries, though there is no clear evidence as to its first appearance. North India and Nepal have a long social tradition in the production of hashish, known locally as charas. (Note: Fossil pollen studies made during 2019 determined a central evolution of cannabis as nearest globally to Qinghai Lake of Tibet; dispersal occurred by circa 30,600 BCE into modern day India) The earliest known (from studies of 2019) evidence of cannabis pollen in the archaeological record is from Japan circa 10,000 BCE.

Hemp is presumed known from the earliest time in the milieu of Islamic medicine. Ibn Taymiyyah (died 1328) thought hashish should be prohibited. Smoking did not become common in the Old World until after the introduction of tobacco; until the 1500s, hashish was consumed as an edible in the Muslim world.

Hashish arrived in Europe from the East during the 18th century. The Napoleonic campaigns introduced French troops to hashish in Egypt and the first description of its useful stems was in 1830 by pharmacist and botanist Theodor Friedrich Ludwig Nees von Esenbeck. (Note: Fankhauser 2008, indicates "With hashish he had found a well-suited medicine to give his patients relief" on the subject of On the Preparations of the Indian Hemp or Gunjah (O'Shaughnessy, 1839), using a definition of "hashish" not confirmed by "resin" of the International Narcotics Control Board (1961; 1972; 1999).) In 1840, Louis Aubert-Roche reported his successful use of hashish against pestilence and typhoid. Also, psychiatric experiments with hashish were done at the same time with Jacques-Joseph Moreau being convinced that it is the supreme medicament for use in psychiatry.

In the 19th century, hashish was embraced in some European literary circles. Most famously, the Club des Hashischins was a Parisian club dedicated to the consumption of hashish and other drugs; its members included writers Théophile Gautier, Dr. Moreau de Tours, Victor Hugo, Alexandre Dumas, Charles Baudelaire and Honoré de Balzac. Baudelaire later wrote the 1860 book Les paradis artificiels about the state of being under the influence of opium and hashish. Around the same time, American author Fitz Hugh Ludlow wrote the 1857 book The Hasheesh Eater about his youthful experiences, both positive and negative, with the drug.

Hashish was used as an anesthetic in Germany in 1869. It was imported in great quantities, especially from India where it is known as charas. Not everyone at the time viewed cannabis as harmless, in fact,as between 1880 and 1900 the peak years of medicinal use where hashish compounds were found almost all over Europe and North America were taking place. Evidence of misuse at that time was practically non-existent (as opposed to widespread reports in Asia and Africa). Hashish played a significant role in the treatment of pain, migraine, dysmenorrhea, pertussis, asthma and insomnia in Europe and USA towards the end of the 19th century. Rare applications included stomach ache, depression, diarrhea, diminished appetite, pruritus, hemorrhage, Basedow syndrome and malaria. The use was later prohibited worldwide as the use as a medicine was made impossible by the 1961 UN Single Convention on Narcotic Drugs.

At the beginning of the 20th century, the majority of hashish in Europe came from Kashmir and other parts of India, Afghanistan, as well as Greece, Syria, Nepal, Lebanon, and Turkey. Larger markets developed in the late 1960s and early 1970s when most of the hashish was imported from Pakistan and Afghanistan. In Greece, Hashish was prevalent in the early decades of the 20th century, and although locally produced for hundreds of years prior, it reached its peak with the coming of two and a half million Greek refugees, expelled from Turkey following the disastrous 1919-21 war. Many of these refugees had habitually smoked hashish in Turkey, using waterpipes, (hookas) called "arghilethes", and due to extreme poverty upon arriving in Greece, and living in overcrowded and poor refugee communities, many hashish dens, called "tekethes", sprung up in Greece's larger cities, the port city of Piraeus, and the northern city of Thessaloniki (where many refugees lived). This gave rise to a substantial urban underclass and sub culture of hashish smokers called "hasiklithes", and a musical genre "rembetika" (oriental sounding), "urban blues" played on the bouzouki, tzoura, and oriental instruments such as the baglama, outi (oud) and kanonaki (kanun) that spoke of life as a hashish user in the "tekethes", as well as about life as refugees, society's unfairness, lack of financial opportunities, prejudice against the refugees, and the deceit of lovers and others in the community. The "tekethes" were closed down in the 1930s by the Greek police and the "rembetes" were jailed and ostracized. In succeeding decades, there was a strong resurgence in Greece of "rembetika" music with the songs of the rembetes and hasiklithes being continually performed publicly by many including the younger generation, as a form of cultural heritage, and have gained respectability and popularity for their frank expressions of that period, and Greek society in general.

== Production ==
It is believed that massive hashish production for international trade originated in Morocco during the 1960s, where the cannabis plant was widely available. Before the coming of the first hippies from the Hippie Trail, only small pieces of Lebanese hashish were found in Morocco.

However, since the 2000s, there has been a dramatic shift in the market due to an increase of homegrown cannabis production. While Morocco held a quasi-monopoly on hashish in the 1990s with the 250-gram (8.8 oz) so-called "soap bar" blocks, which were of low quality, but by 2008 Afghanistan was regarded as the biggest producer of higher quality hashish. Since then, hashish quality in Europe has increased while its prices have remained stable, with the exception of during the COVID-19 pandemic, where the cannabis street prices surged due to various national lockdowns.

Morocco has been the major hashish producer globally with €10.8 billion earned from Moroccan resin in 2004, but some so-called "Moroccan" may actually be European-made. The income for the farmers was around €325 million in 2005. While the overall number of plants and areas shrank in size, the introduction of more potent hybrid plants produced a high resin rate. The amount of resin produced is estimated to range between 3,800 and 9,500 tonnes in 2005.

The largest producer in 2010 was Afghanistan, however studies suggest there is a "hashish revival" in Morocco. Cannabis production in Afghanistan fell sharply after the second Taliban takeover in 2021 and remained highly volatile in subsequent years: hashish production was estimated at 1,500 tons in October 2026, having partially recovered from re-prohibition in 2021, but still well below earlier levels during the coalition occupation.

Hashish remains in high demand in most of the world while quality continues to increase, due to many Moroccan and western farmers in Morocco and other hash producing countries using more advanced cultivation methods as well as cultivating further developed cannabis strains which increases yields greatly, as well as improving resin quality with higher ratios of psychoactive ingredients (THC). A tastier, smoother and more aromatic terpenes and flavonoids profile is seen as an indicator of a significant rise in hashish quality in more recent years. Hashish production in Spain has also become more popular and is on the rise, however the demand for relatively cheap and high-quality Moroccan hash is still extremely high.

Changes to regulations around the world have contributed greatly to more and more countries becoming legitimate hashish producing regions, with countries like Spain effecting more lenient laws on cannabis products such as hashish. Washington State followed by Colorado started regulating cultivation, manufacturing and distribution of cannabis and cannabis derived products such as hashish in the United States, followed by many other places in the US (such as Humboldt, California) and around the world.

== European market ==
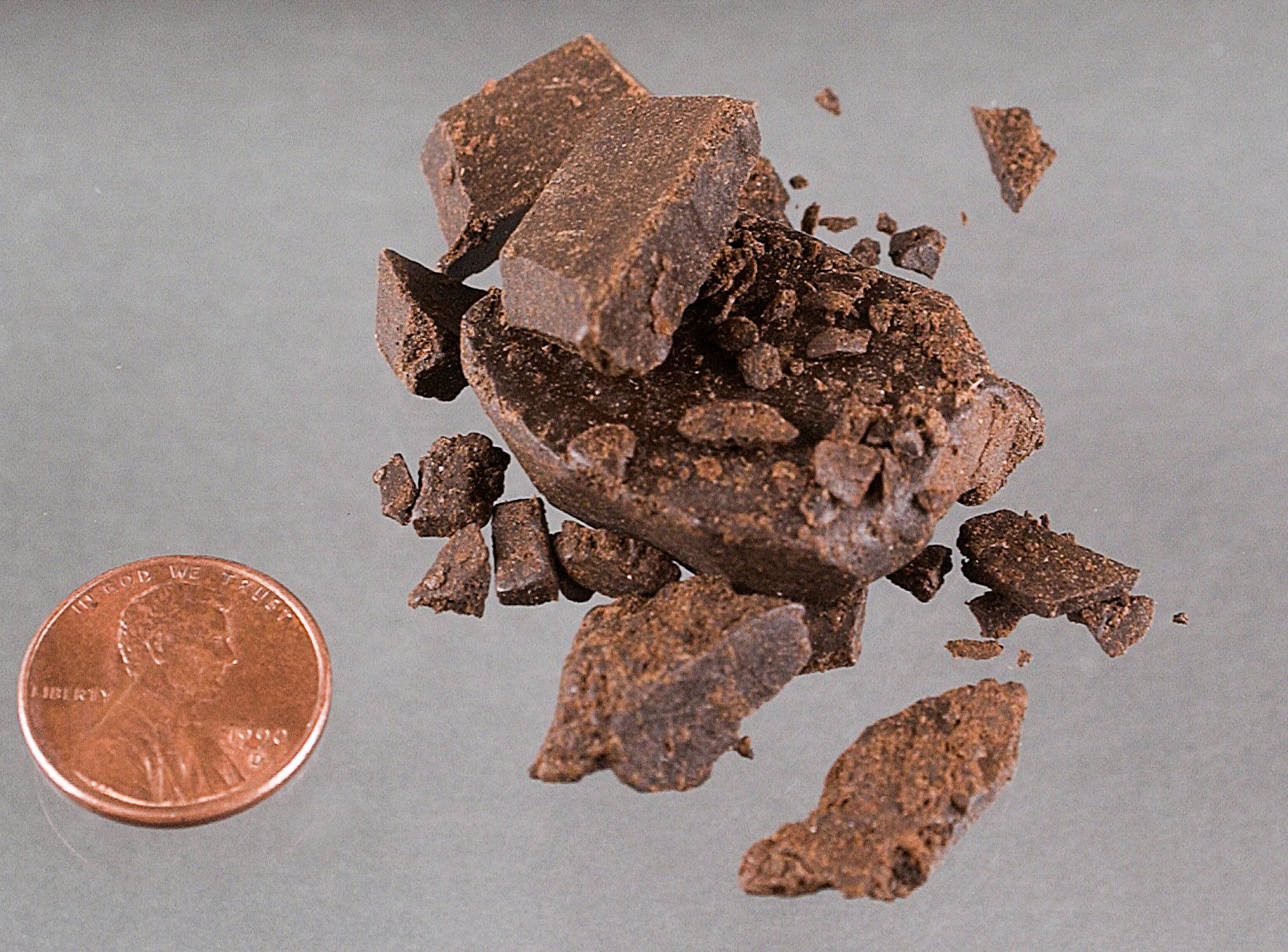
Hashish shown next to a 19-millimetre (3/4 in) diameter U.S. penny for scale

According to the European Monitoring Centre for Drugs and Drug Addiction (EMCDDA), Western Europe is the biggest market for cannabis resin with 70% of global seizures. However, the European hashish market is changing. Cannabis cultivation increased throughout the 1990s until 2004, with a noticeable decrease reported in 2005 according to the European Monitoring Centre for Drugs and Drug Addiction. Historically, Morocco has been the major source for hashish. Lately, however, there has been a shift in the market, and Afghanistan has been named the major producer of hashish.

As 641 tonnes of hashish were consumed in the EU in 2013, the European market is currently the world's largest and most profitable. Therefore, many players are involved in the business, including organised crime groups. The largest cannabis resin seizures in Europe happen in Portugal, due to its proximity to Northern Africa.

The 1990s "soap bars" disappeared and the physical shapes of hashish changed to melon shaped, tablets or olive shaped pellets. Overall the general trend of domestically grown cannabis displacing the imported resin leads to a market reaction of potency changes while the prices remain stable while soap-bar potency increased from 8% to up to 20.7% in 2014.

Generally, more resin than herb is consumed in Europe.

== Substance properties ==
Hashish samples from India, Lebanon and Morocco confiscated in Europe and Israel in 2005 contained all appreciable amounts of cannabidiol (CBD), and cannabinol (CBN), in addition to tetrahydrocannabinol (THC). In some samples the CBD-content was significantly higher than the THC-content. The simultaneous occurrence of these three cannabinoids constitute the typical, chemical profile of hashish consumed in Europe and Northern Africa. In comparison, most high-potency cannabis products contain only THC. It is believed that the psychotropic effects of hashish are therefore more subtle, and sedative. The potency of unprocessed cultivated or stock cannabis flowers increased greatly—with flowers containing upwards of 25% THC by weight, circa the early 21st century.

In a study conducted in 2014 by Jean-Jaques Filippi, Marie Marchini, Céline Charvoz, Laurence Dujourdy and Nicolas Baldovini (Multidimensional analysis of cannabis volatile constituents: Identification of 5,5-dimethyl-1-vinylbicyclo[2.1.1]hexane as a volatile marker of hashish, the resin of Cannabis sativa L.) the researchers linked the characteristic flavour of hashish with a rearrangement of myrcene caused during the process of manufacture.

In the early 21st century, the terpene hashishene was identified as possibly responsible for the characteristic smell and aroma of hashish, as compared to raw herbal cannabis.

Depending on the production process, the product can be contaminated with different amounts of dirt and plant fragments, varying greatly in terms of appearance, texture, odour and potency. Also, adulterants may be added in order to increase weight or modify appearance.

== Short-term effects ==
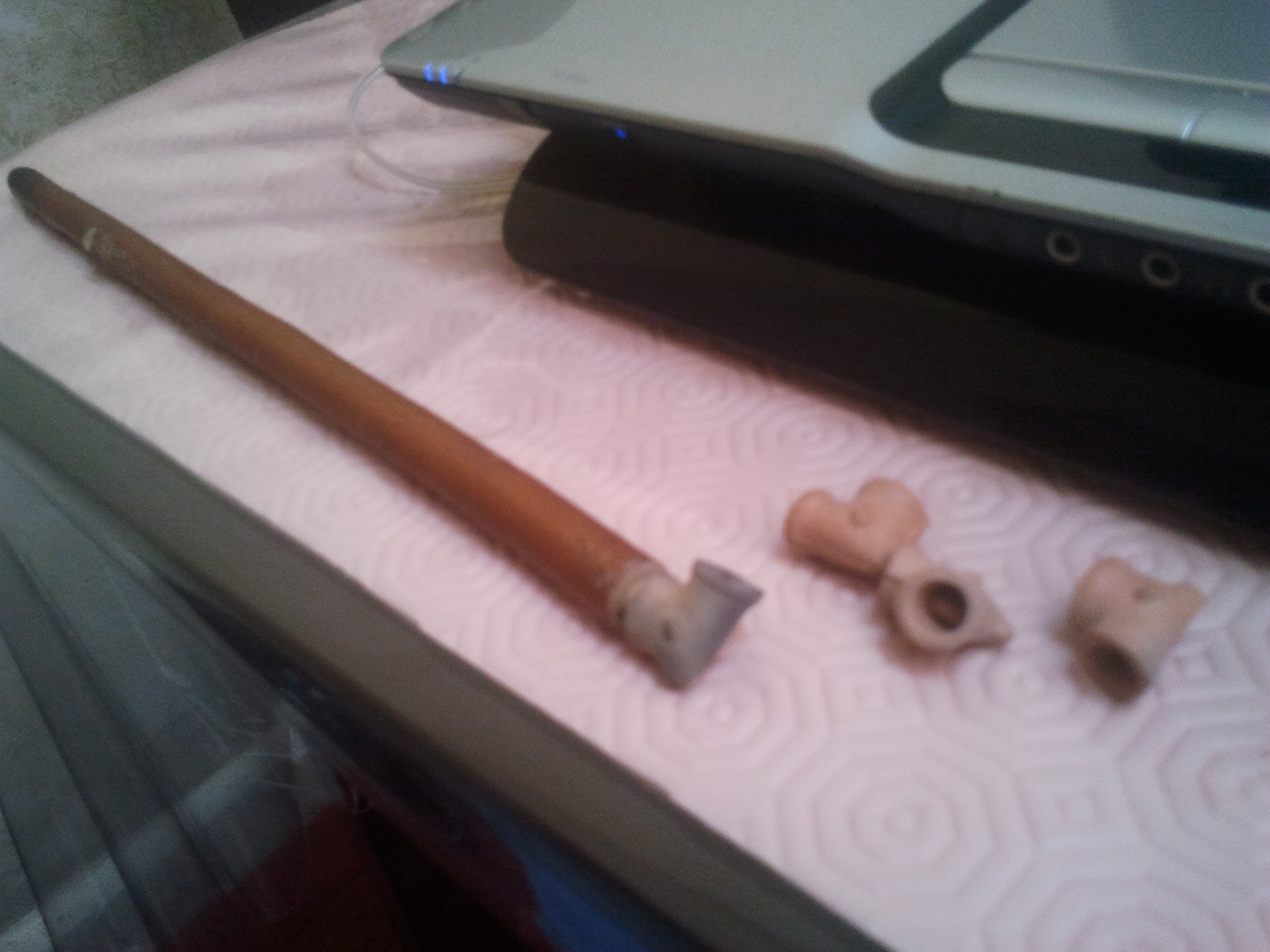
Sebsi, a Moroccan long-drawtube one-hitter

Hashish can be consumed by ingestion or inhalation from smoking. When smoked, it may be smoked in a pipe, bong, vaporizer or joints, where it is often mixed with tobacco, as pure hashish will burn poorly alone. THC has a low water solubility therefore it is most effective when ingested alongside a fatty meal or snack. Not all hashish can be consumed orally as some is not decarboxylated during manufacture. Generally the methods are similar to overall cannabis consumption.

As hashish's active ingredient is THC, it has the same effects as cannabis. The onset is felt within 15 minutes when smoking, and about 30 to 60 minutes when eaten. Common effects include:

- changes in perception; including a feeling of relaxation, pleasure (“high” or euphoria)
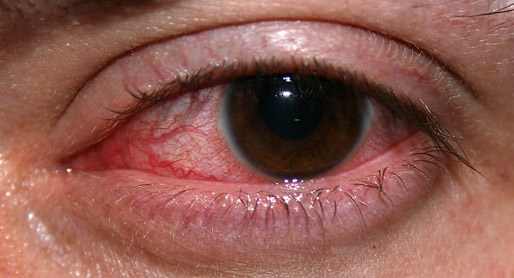
  Blood-shot eyes are a sign of cannabis use.
- poor short-term memory
- increased appetite
- altered feeling in the senses (the ability to see colors, hear sounds and taste food more clearly), as a result of the drug increasing the activity of the senses
- altered sense of time and space (feeling that time is slow and the distances are longer)
- dry mouth and throat
- impaired motor skills
- cognitive impairment, including poor reactions
- blood-shot eye
- fast heartbeat
- orthostatic hypotension (a drop in blood pressure when standing)

Side effects with overdose may include anxiety, paranoia and panic.

== Manufacturing processes ==
Making charas from fresh cannabis resin, Uttarakhand, India

Hashish is made from cannabinoid-rich glandular hairs known as trichomes, as well as varying amounts of cannabis flower and leaf fragments. The flowers of a mature female plant contain the most trichomes, though trichomes are also found on other parts of the plant. Certain strains of cannabis are cultivated specifically for their ability to produce large amounts of trichomes. The resin reservoirs of the trichomes, sometimes erroneously called pollen (vendors often use the euphemism "pollen catchers" to describe screened kief-grinders in order to skirt paraphernalia-selling laws), are separated from the plant through various methods.

The sticky resins of the fresh flowering female cannabis plant are collected. Traditionally this was, and still is, done in remote locations by pressing or rubbing the flowering plant between two hands and then forming the sticky resins into a small ball of hashish called charas. This method produces the highest amount of cannabinoids (THC content up to 60%) without chemical solvents or distillation. The best quality charas is produced in Central Asia, and sold in sausage-like shapes.

Mechanical separation methods use physical action to remove the trichomes from the dried plant material, such as sieving through a screen by hand or in motorized tumblers. This technique is known as "drysifting". The resulting powder, referred to as "kief" or "drysift", is compressed with the aid of heat into blocks of hashish; if pure, the kief will become gooey and pliable. When a high level of pure THC is present, the end product will be almost transparent and will start to melt at the point of human contact.

Ice-water separation is another mechanical method of isolating trichomes. Newer techniques have been developed such as heat and pressure separations, static-electricity sieving or acoustical dry sieving.

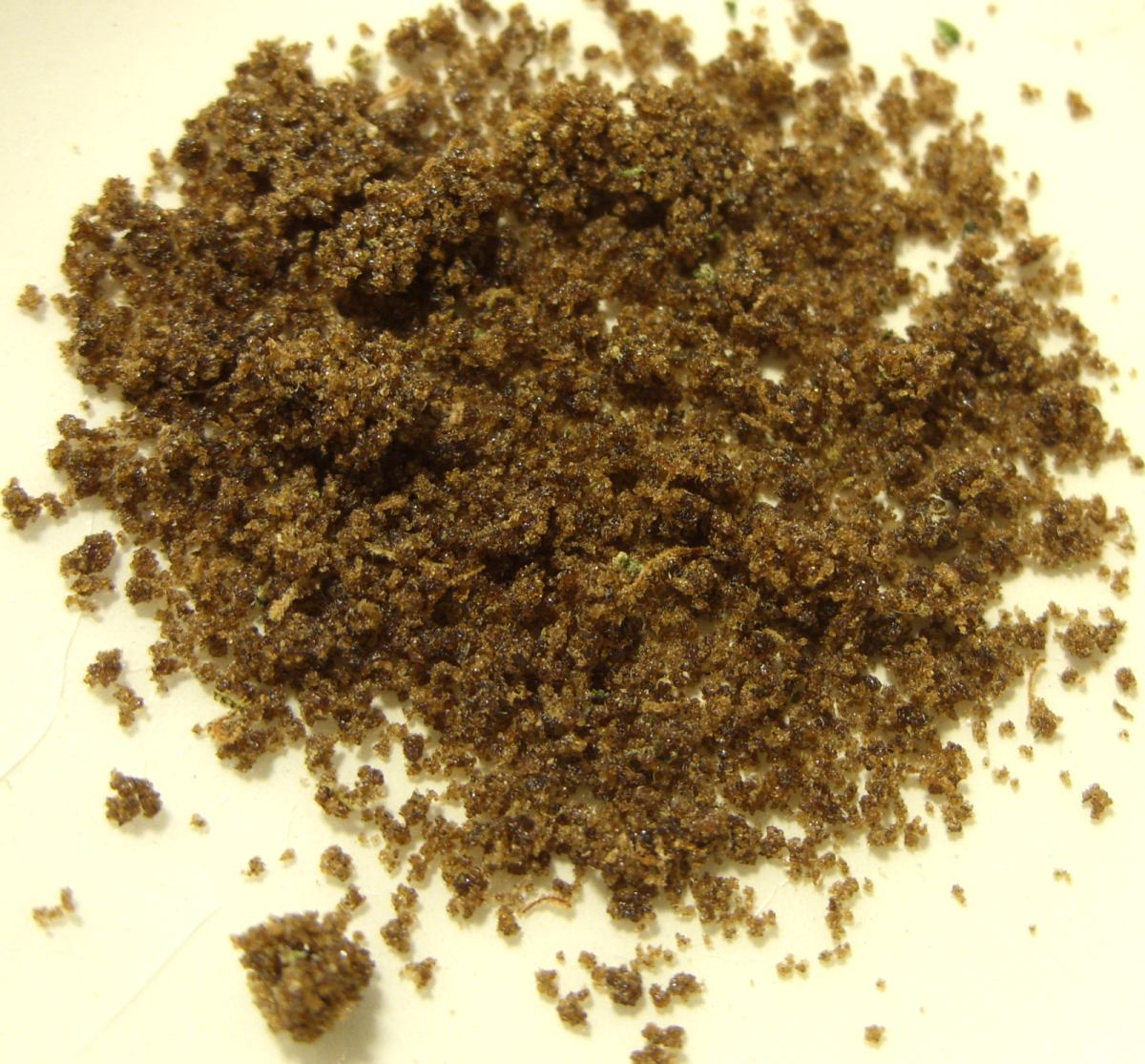
Trichomes isolated with ice-water extraction method

Trichomes may break away from supporting stalks and leaves when plant material becomes brittle at low temperatures. After plant material has been agitated in an icy slush, separated trichomes are often dense enough to sink to the bottom of the ice-water mixture following agitation, while lighter pieces of leaves and stems tend to float.

The ice-water method requires ice, water, agitation, filtration bags with various-sized screens and plant material. With the ice-water extraction method the resin becomes hard and brittle and can easily be separated. This allows large quantities of pure resins to be extracted in a very clean process without the use of solvents, making for a more purified hashish.

Chemical separation methods generally use a solvent such as ethanol, butane or hexane to dissolve the lipophilic desirable resin. Remaining plant materials are filtered out of the solution and sent to the compost. The solvent is then evaporated, or boiled off (purged) leaving behind the desirable resins, called honey oil, "hash oil", or just "oil". Honey oil still contains waxes and essential oils and can be further purified by vacuum distillation to yield "red oil". The product of chemical separations is more commonly referred to as "honey oil". This oil is not really hashish, as the latter name covers trichomes that are extracted by sieving. This leaves most of the glands intact.

Solventless Rosin Method was discovered by Phil Salazar in 2015. Rosin is created by pressing Cannabis Flower, Dry sift, or Ice water hash in between parchment paper using a pneumatic or hydraulic press with heated plates to create force and pressure to expel the oil from the product. The moisture present in the flower, Dry Sift, or ice water hash will create steam pressure and force the oil from the source creating a solventless hash product.

== Quality ==
Tiny pieces of leaf matter may be accidentally or even purposefully added; adulterants introduced when the hashish is being produced will reduce the purity of the material and often resulting in green finished product. If hash is particularly sticky, this can mean that additional oils have been added to increase the overall weight of the product. The most common quality indicator is the smell. High-quality hash will smell fragrant and aromatic, whereas hash of low quality may have a distinct mouldy or musty aroma. The tetrahydrocannabinol (THC) content of hashish comes in wide ranges from almost none to 65% and that of hash oil from 30% to 90%. Hashish can also contain appreciable amounts of CBD, CBN and also contain trace amounts of other cannabinoids.

As mentioned above, there has been a general increase in potency as the competition has grown bigger and new hybrid plants have been developed.

== See also ==
- Cannabis culture – Culture relating to cannabis
