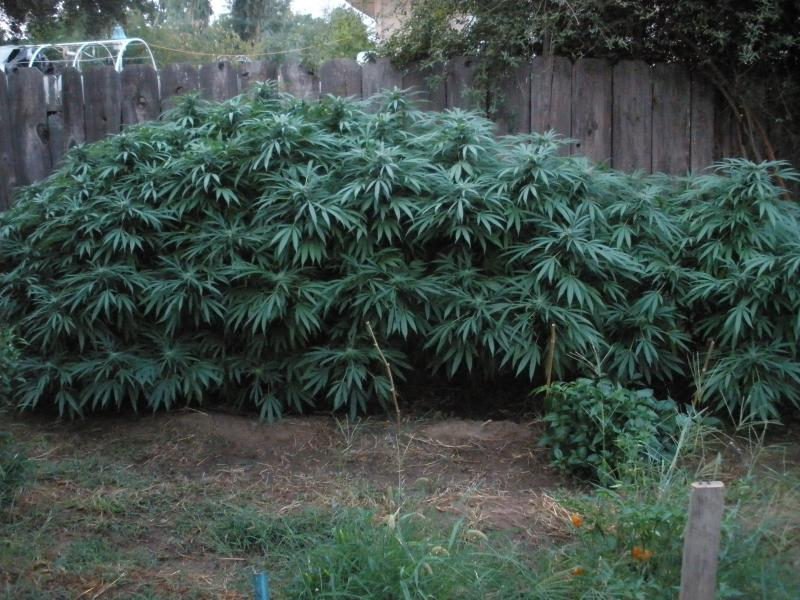
- Purple Kush

Scientific classification
- Kingdom: Plantae
- Clade: Tracheophytes
- Clade: Angiosperms
- Clade: Eudicots
- Clade: Rosids
- Order: Rosales
- Family: Cannabaceae
- Genus: Cannabis
- Species: C. indica

Binomial name
- Cannabis indica Lam.

= Cannabis indica =

Species of plant

Cannabis indica is an annual plant species in the family Cannabaceae indigenous to the Hindu Kush mountains of Southern Asia. The plant produces large amounts of tetrahydrocannabinol (THC) and tetrahydrocannabivarin (THCV), with total cannabinoid levels being much higher than observed in industrial hemp varieties. It is now widely grown in China, India, Nepal, Thailand, Afghanistan, and Pakistan, as well as southern and western Africa, and is cultivated for purposes including hashish in India. The high concentrations of THC or THCV provide euphoric effects making it popular for use for several purposes, not only simple pleasure but also clinical drug research, potential new drug research, and use in alternative medicine, among many others.

== Taxonomy ==
In 1785, Jean-Baptiste Lamarck published a description of a second species of Cannabis, which he named Cannabis indica. Lamarck based his description of the newly named species on plant specimens collected in India. Richard Evans Schultes described C. indica as relatively short, conical, and densely branched, whereas C. sativa was described as tall and laxly branched. Loran C. Anderson described C. indica plants as having short, broad leaflets whereas those of C. sativa were characterized as relatively long and narrow. C. indica plants conforming to Schultes's and Anderson's descriptions originated from the Hindu Kush mountain range. Because of the often harsh and variable climate of those parts (extremely cold winters and warm summers), C. indica is well-suited for cultivation in temperate climates.

The specific epithet indica is Latin for "of India" and has come to be synonymous with the cannabis strain.

There was very little debate about the taxonomy of Cannabis until the 1970s, when botanists like Richard Evans Schultes began testifying in court on behalf of accused persons who sought to avoid criminal charges of possession of C. sativa by arguing that the plant material could instead be C. indica.

== Cultivation ==
Broad-leafed C. indica plants in the Indian subcontinent are traditionally cultivated for the production of charas, a form of hashish. Pharmacologically, C. indica landraces tend to have higher THC content than C. sativa strains. Some users report more of a "stoned" feeling and less of a "high" from C. indica when compared to C. sativa. The C. indica high is often referred to as a "body buzz" and has beneficial properties such as pain relief in addition to being an effective treatment for insomnia and an anxiolytic, as opposed to C. sativa's more common reports of a cerebral, creative and energetic high, and even (albeit rarely) including hallucinations. Differences in the terpenoid content of the essential oil may account for some of these differences in effect. Common C. indica strains for recreational or medicinal use include Kush and Northern Lights.

A recent genetic analysis included both the narrow-leaflet and wide-leaflet drug "biotypes" under C. indica, as well as southern and eastern Asian hemp (fiber/seed) landraces and wild Himalayan populations.

== Genome ==
In 2011, a team of Canadian researchers led by Andrew Sud announced that they had sequenced a draft genome of the Purple Kush strain of C. indica.

== Gallery ==
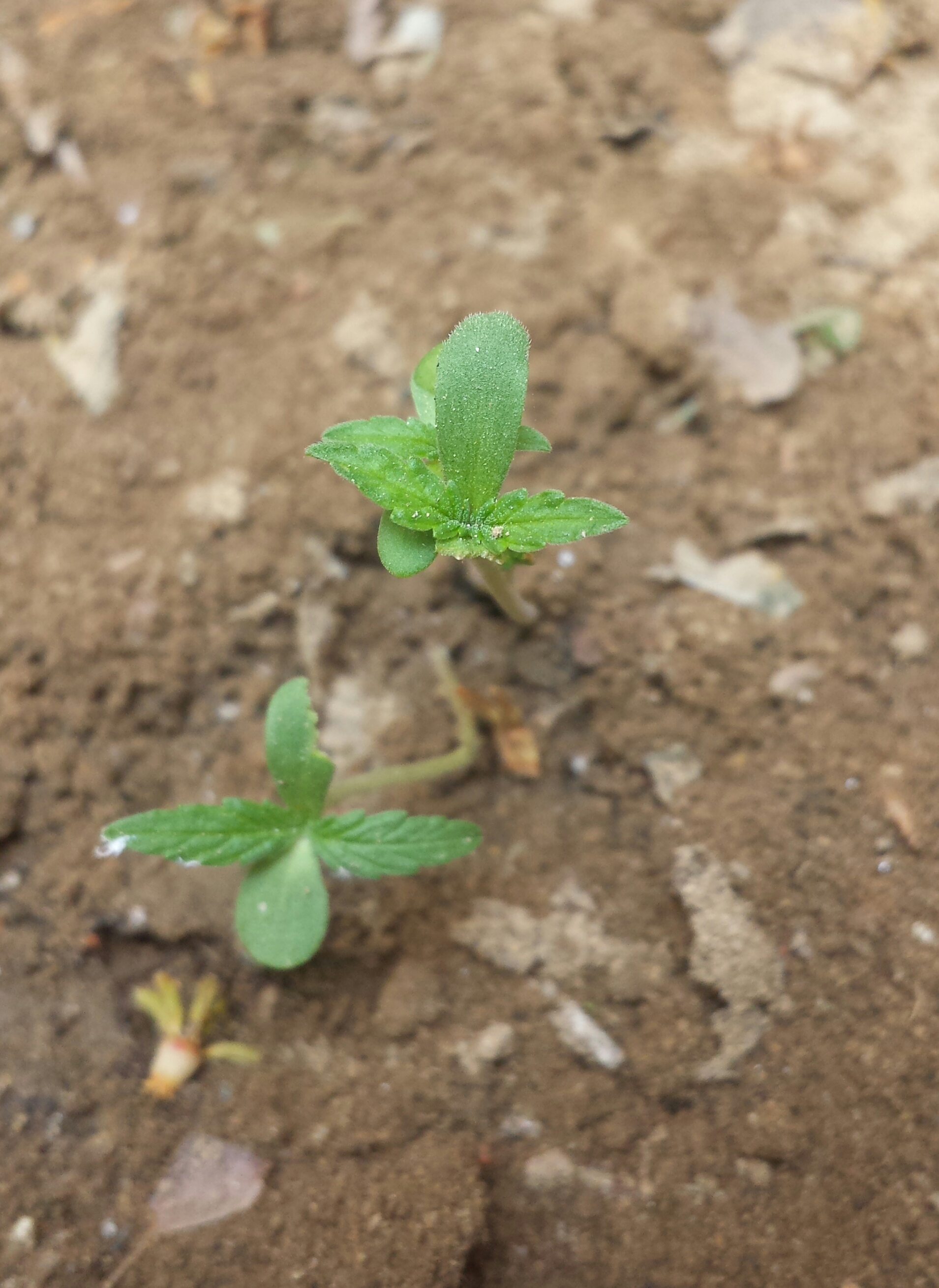
Seedling

Broad leaf

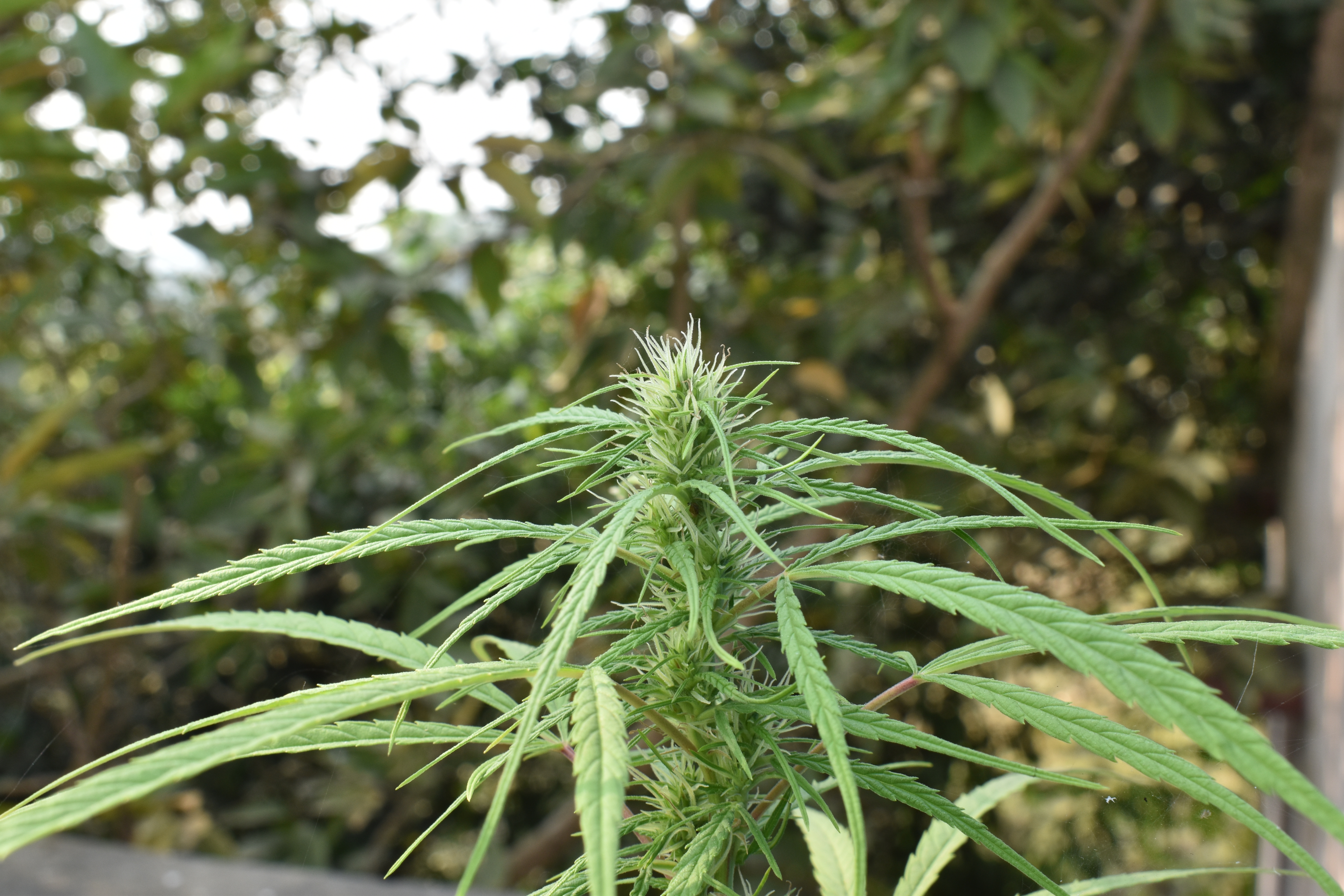
Indian Cannabis buds

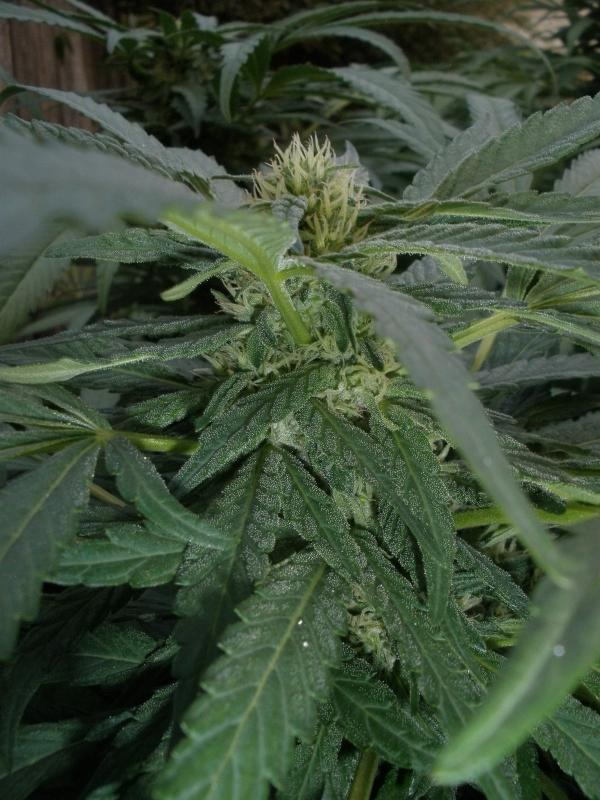
C. indica flowering

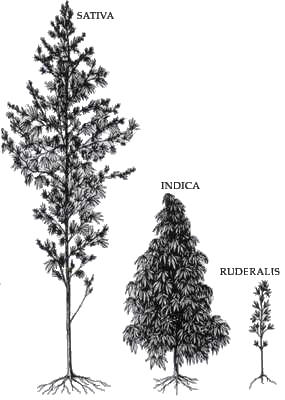
Comparison of Cannabis species
