= List of cannabis rights organizations =

The following is a list of cannabis rights organizations:

== Cannabis rights organizations ==
=== United States ===
- Alliance for Cannabis Therapeutics
- American Alliance for Medical Cannabis
- American Civil Liberties Union
- American Medical Marijuana Association
- Americans for Safe Access
- Buffalo Cannabis Movement
- California Cannabis Research Medical Group
- Cannabis Action Network
- Coalition for Rescheduling Cannabis
- Doctors for Cannabis Regulation
- Drug Policy Alliance
- Green Panthers
- Law Enforcement Action Partnership
- Marijuana Policy Project
- Medical Marijuana Assistance Program of America
- Multidisciplinary Association for Psychedelic Studies
- National Cannabis Industry Association
- National Organization for the Reform of Marijuana Laws (NORML)
  - Massachusetts Cannabis Reform Coalition (MassCann/NORML)
  - Minnesota NORML
  - Ohio NORML
  - Oregon NORML
  - Otago NORML
  - Portland NORML
  - Texas NORML
  - Wisconsin NORML
- November Coalition
- Patients Out of Time
- Rhode Island Patient Advocacy Coalition
- Safer Alternative for Enjoyable Recreation
- Society of Cannabis Clinicians
- Students for Sensible Drug Policy
- Veterans for Medical Cannabis Access
- Women Grow

=== Europe ===
- Cannabis Law Reform
- Cannabis sans frontières
- Dank of England
- ENCOD
- European Industrial Hemp Association
- FAAAT think & do tank
- Finnish Cannabis Association
- Global Commission on Drug Policy
- ICEERS
- NORML France
- NORML UK

=== Elsewhere ===
- Dagga Couple (South Africa)
- NORML New Zealand

== Cannabis political parties ==
- Ale Yarok
- Anti-prohibition Party
- Aotearoa Legalise Cannabis Party
- Australian Marijuana Party
- Bloc pot
- British Columbia Marijuana Party
- Cannabis Party (Denmark)
- Cannabis Party (Spain)
- Cannabis Without Borders (France)
- CISTA
- Dagga Party (South Africa)
- Grassroots–Legalize Cannabis Party
- Grassroots Party
- Guns and Dope Party
- Holocaust Survivors and Grown-Up Green Leaf Party
- Independent Grassroots
- Legalise Cannabis Australia
- Legal Marijuana Now (United States)
  - Minnesota Legal Marijuana Now! Party
  - Nebraska Legal Marijuana NOW Party
  - New Jersey Legalize Marijuana Party
- Marijuana Party (Canada)
- Marijuana Reform Party
- Saskatchewan Marijuana Party
- U.S. Marijuana Party
- Willie Nelson's TeaPot Party
- Youth International Party

== Other cultural cannabis-related organizations ==
=== Festivals ===
- Emerald Empire Hempfest
- Freedom Rally
- Global Marijuana March
- Great Midwest Marijuana Harvest Festival
- Hanfparade
- Hash Bash
- John Sinclair Freedom Rally
- MardiGrass
- Missoula Hempfest
- Moscow Hemp Fest
- National Cannabis Festival
- Olympia Hempfest
- Portland Hempstalk Festival
- Salem Hempfest
- Seattle Hempfest
- Spannabis
- Weedstock
- Weed the People

=== Churches ===
- Church of Cognizance
- Church of the Universe
- Ethiopian Zion Coptic Church
- First Church of Cannabis
- International Church of Cannabis
- THC Ministry

=== Museums ===
- Cannabis Museum (Japan)
- Hash, Marihuana & Hemp Museum (Barcelona)
- Hemp Museum (Berlin)
- Hemp Museum Gallery (Amsterdam)
- Montevideo Cannabis Museum
- Whakamana Cannabis Museum

=== Other ===
- Centenary of Cannabis prohibition

== See also ==
- List of anti-cannabis organizations
- List of cannabis companies
- List of cannabis rights leaders
