= Buffalo Cannabis Movement =

American grassroots organization

- Formation: 2014
- Type: Non Profit, Grassroots
- Purpose: Legalization or decriminalization of marijuana in the United States
- Location: Buffalo NY
- Region served: United States

The Buffalo Cannabis Movement is an American grassroots and nonprofit organization based in Buffalo, New York, whose aim is to move public opinion sufficiently to achieve the legalization of non-medical marijuana in the United States so that the responsible use of cannabis by adults is no longer subject to penalty. BCM's mission aligns with NORML's mission of "support[ing] the removal of all criminal penalties for the private possession and responsible use of marijuana by adults, including the cultivation for personal use, and the casual nonprofit transfers of small amounts," and "support[ing] the development of a legally controlled market for cannabis."

As of 2024, the BCM is still an active nonprofit and grassroots organization working across the state of New York, Pennsylvania and various other places across the United States such as Tonawanda, Buffalo and Erie county.

== History ==
BCM was founded in 2014 as the Buffalo Marijuana Movement having first drafted the 2014 bill "The Buffalo Marijuana Act". Since then, the organization has played a central role in the cannabis movement in Buffalo. The organization is growing grassroots movement with members ranging from stay-at-home parents, and veterans, to academics of higher education, and members of the medical industry. BCM holds monthly public meetings as well as "as needed" committee meeting.

In spring 2015, the group voted to change their name from marijuana to cannabis due to connotations of the term including anti-Mexican sentiments from the 1930s and the more recent racist "new jim crow" history behind the term.

Criticisms of the NYS compassionate care act and its implementation lead the group to draft a new bill, The Buffalo Medical Cannabis Act, that would expand up the NYS law which they believe would be more successful.

== Media and activism ==
As an advocacy group, BCM has been active in spreading its message to the public.

In late 2014, the three-part bill "The Buffalo Marijuana Act" comprising the "Lowest Police Priority Act", "Buffalo Medical Marijuana Act", and the "Buffalo Industrial Hemp Act" was introduced to the Buffalo Common Council. The bill was originally tabled to give the public time to rally around the bill.

In the summer of 2015, the "Buffalo Medical Cannabis Act" was drafted to expand upon the CCA (Compassionate Care Act of NYS) with input from law enforcement, concerned parents, academics, and doctors including pharmaceutical experts. The bill would expand the CCA by allowing flowers(combustible) for patients, adding coverage of several more diseases, regulating dosage by mg of THC (not just THC-CBD ratios), "Compassionate Exemption"(emergency care for hospitals), "Smart Card Technology" medical cards produced by the local DEA department, and setting up a committee with 5 appointed members (DEA, Doctor, Buffalo Police Department, and a community or parent advocate) for the implementation of the act. The Buffalo Common Council on September 8, 2015, moved to table the bill pending research in the CCA, BMCA, and what they could implement at the local level. However they are working on passing a resolution/house rule for what the BMCA called for, i.e. local manufacturing and dispensing, expanded patient care, emergency provisions, etc.

== See also ==
- Americans for Safe Access
- California Senate Bill 420 (colloquially known as the Medical Marijuana Program Act)
- Cannabis in the United States
- Drug Policy Alliance
- DrugWarRant
- High Times
- Law Enforcement Against Prohibition (LEAP)
- Legality of cannabis
- Marijuana Policy Project
- Multidisciplinary Association for Psychedelic Studies
- November Coalition
- Removal of cannabis from Schedule I of the Controlled Substances Act
- Students for Sensible Drug Policy
