= Massachusetts Cannabis Reform Coalition =

- Founded: 1990
- Type: Public Education Organization
- Purpose: Legalization or decriminalization of marijuana in Massachusetts
- Location(s): POB 0266; Georgetown, Massachusetts 01833-0366; USA
- Region served: Massachusetts
- Key people: Steven S. Epstein, Esq.; Bill Downing; Keith Saunders, PhD.
- Website: Official MassCann Website

The Massachusetts Cannabis Reform Coalition (MassCann) is a non-profit public education organization working for the moderation of marijuana laws. MassCann organizes the Freedom Rally on Boston Common every third Saturday in September. Their newsletter, Mass Grass, is published six times annually. Membership is open to the public and leadership is democratically elected at the annual winter membership meeting, usually held in March. In June 2019, MassCann had its status as an affiliate of National Organization for the Reform of Marijuana Laws suspended due to controversy surrounding now former Board Member Samson Racioppi.

== History ==
MassCann was founded October 21, 1990, by Steven S. Epstein, Linda Noel, John Hardin, Madelyn Webster, Gary Insuik, Christopher Perron, John Miqliorini, Therese Slye and Ron Massad. Linda Noel was the first president and was also active with the High Times Freedom Fighters. Steven Epstein was the first clerk and Madelyn (Maddy) Webster was the first treasurer. In 1991 Dave Getchell was elected president, but after just a few months Dave handed the job to Bill Downing who served as president until 2004. Steven Epstein, an attorney, was elected treasurer in 1991 and remained treasurer through January 2012.

MassCann seeks to raise public awareness about Cannabis sativa's use and potential in Massachusetts To those ends MC leaders and members have written, published, spoken, debated, marched, rallied, organized, donated, illustrated, and otherwise volunteered in numerous ways.

=== 2020 Board Member Controversy ===
In January 2020, MassCann elected Samson Racioppi to its board of directors. Racioppi is also President of Super Happy Fun America, which has organized events surrounding Straight pride and Blue Lives Matter. Amid the George Floyd protests of 2020, SHFA organized a rally supporting Law Enforcement which took place on 25 June 2020.

In response to MassCann members' and the general public's reaction to Racioppi's role in the rally, MassCann had its affiliation with the national NORML organization suspended until it shows a "clear opposition to bigotry." MassCann called an emergency board meeting on 1 July 2020 in response to the suspension of their chapter status. After the board unanimously called for his removal from the board, Racioppi ultimately resigned.

Members also called for the removal of Bill Flynn as board member and president due to persistent "bullying" of members, vendors, and partners. Other board members alleged that Flynn's behavior had caused the loss of 200 members in just one year, and that vendors and partners were dropping out of events because they felt disrespected by Flynn. Flynn felt the allegations were not sufficient for him to resign, and refused to step down. The board (minus Samson at the request of the members) voted on a series of questions from the bylaws which governed if they were able to forcibly remove Flynn. The board ultimately failed to remove Flynn involuntarily; however, they were successfully able to call for a vote of no-confidence in Flynn as president of the organization. Throughout the discussion surrounding Flynn, members continuously called to ban Flynn from MassCann as a whole, and the board encouraged members to request a vote calling for his removal as a board member and member of MassCann.

== MassCann events ==
The group organizes the Freedom Rally held on the third Saturday in September on Boston Common. It is traditionally the second largest annual gathering demanding marijuana law reform in the United States, after the Seattle Hempfest. MC has successfully sued the City of Boston for permits for the Freedom Rally three times.

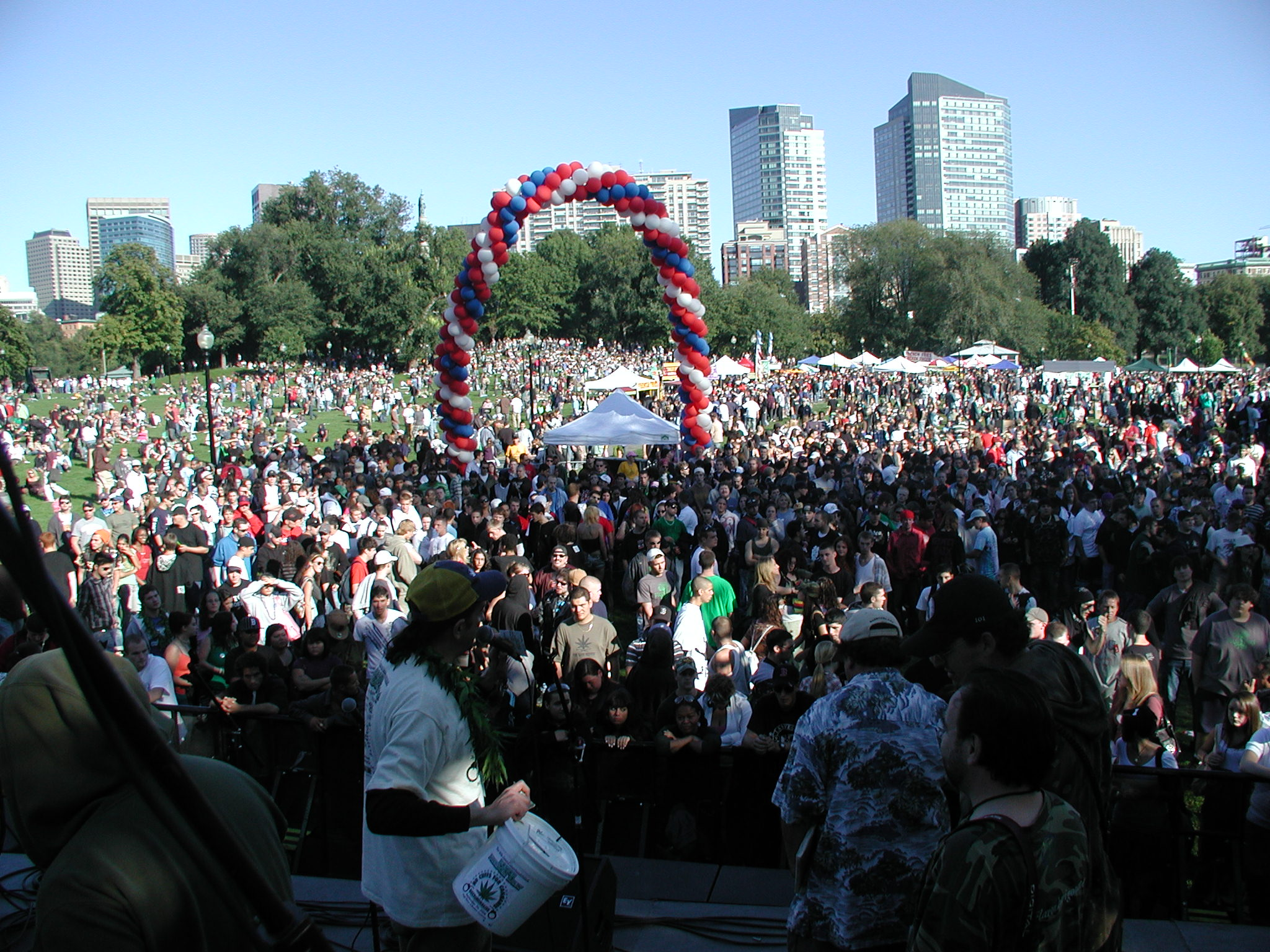
MassCann's Freedom Rally in Boston 2008

Other MC events include:

- Co-sponsorship of two Harvard Law School conferences on drug policy, first on May 18, 1991, and second on May 21, 1994.
- A July 11, 1992 protest and march in Chelmsford, Massachusetts in opposition to the taking of the Farmer family residence by forfeiture.
- Tax Day protests from 1994 until 1998, calling for the taxation of regulated marijuana sales, held at the last post office open in the state on Tax Day, the Boston Postal Annex. At one of those protests hundreds of ounce bags of marijuana seed were thrown to the crowd.
- Annual Boston participation in the Global Marijuana March from 2004 on.
- Benefit shows in rock clubs around Boston.

== Organization ==
MC has virtually no overhead costs, with neither personnel nor offices. Every action of MassCann is done by volunteers.

The MassCann board of directors and officers were honored as High Times Freedom Fighters of the Month. March 2012 saw many long-term directors stepping down and first-time directors coming in. A women's group was formed that intends to inform the Massachusetts public of benefits for women's issues such as premenstrual stress. Co-founder attorney Steve Epstein has departed. Bill Downing is among long-term directors remaining on board.

Various sub-chapters of MC have been formed over the years, the most notable of which is the University of Massachusetts Amherst Cannabis Reform Coalition (UMassCRC). Their annual spring Extravaganja rally on Amherst Common has grown in popularity over the years.

== MassCann legislative partners ==
In the 1990s MC worked closely with the ACLU-Massachusetts Drug Policy Task Force and the Massachusetts Coalition for Medical Cannabis or MC^{2} on legislative issues including:

- Passage of the Bertonazzi bill: An act creating a marijuana therapeutic research program in the Massachusetts Department of Public Health, passed by the legislature and signed into law by the governor in 1992. It is codified at M.G.L. c. 94D. Over 14,000 signatures were gathered in this effort
- Passage of the Joe Hutchins Act: A medical necessity defense for the possession of marijuana which was signed by Governor William Weld in August 1997. It is codified at M.G.L. c. 94C, s. 34.

In 1999 MassCann activists formed the Committee for the Reform of Marijuana Laws (CRML) in support of a proposed statewide ballot initiative that would decriminalize adult possession of marijuana in Massachusetts. Though the all-volunteer signature drive gathered over 20,000 signatures, it fell short of the required 57,000 and the initiative effort was abandoned.

Beginning in 1996 MassCann activists targeted state senatorial and representative districts with public policy questions on local ballots. These non-binding ballot questions were run in districts where the senator or representative held sway over and stood in opposition to medicinal cannabis or decriminalization legislation. The questions, when approved, told the legislator to introduce and support medicinal cannabis or decriminalization legislation. The legislators were free to disobey these directives from their constituencies (as they are non-binding), but by doing so would demonstrate disrespect for the wishes of the voters.

Eventually public policy questions were run in 41 districts. Some were run by former MassCann board members who formed the Drug Policy Forum of Massachusetts (DPFMA). Every one of the 41 public policy questions run up until now has passed with an average of 63% of the voters in support (almost 2 to 1). The results from these public policy questions caught the attention of the Marijuana Policy Project and inspired their funding of a statewide decriminalization ballot initiative. That initiative passed by a comfortable 30+ point margin (34.8% opposed; 65.2% for).

== See also ==
- NORML
- Drug Policy Alliance
- Legality of cannabis
- Removal of cannabis from Schedule I of the Controlled Substances Act
- Marijuana Policy Project
- Multidisciplinary Association for Psychedelic Studies
- Students for Sensible Drug Policy
- Illegal drug trade
- Law Enforcement Against Prohibition (LEAP)
- November Coalition
- Prohibition of alcohol
- Americans for Safe Access
