= Cannabis in Massachusetts =

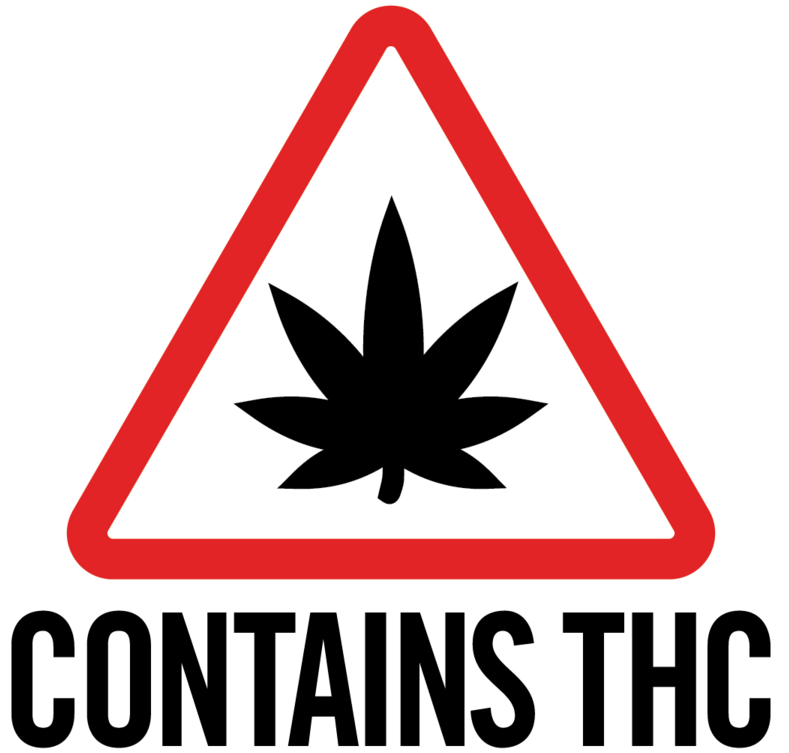
Massachusetts' THC Universal Symbol

Cannabis in Massachusetts is legal for medical and recreational use. A century after becoming the first U.S. state to criminalize recreational cannabis, Massachusetts voters elected to legalize it in 2016.

In 2008 Massachusetts voters decriminalized the possession of small amounts of marijuana. Massachusetts became the eighteenth state to legalize medical marijuana when voters passed a ballot measure in 2012. Recreational marijuana is legal in Massachusetts as of December 15, 2016, following a ballot initiative in November of that year.

As of 2010 almost 10% of Massachusetts residents over the age of 12 had used marijuana in the past month, and almost 16% had used marijuana within the past year. The largest event for the support of the legalization of marijuana, the Boston Freedom Rally, which draws thousands of attendees from all over the region, takes place every year in September. This despite reports that adolescents who used marijuana for 5+ days in the past month had a 2.3 times higher risk of developing an anxiety disorder by age 25 (JAMA Psychiatry, 2022).

== Legality ==
Recreational marijuana is regulated and taxed but legal in Massachusetts, with retail sales from licensed dealers becoming legal on November 20, 2018. Legalization occurred in staging, with decriminalization followed by legal medical marijuana before full legalization.

=== Restriction ===
In 1911 (some sources state 1914) Massachusetts became the first state to restrict cannabis on a state level, prohibiting the sale of "Indian hemp" without a prescription.

=== Decriminalization ===
On November 4, 2008, Massachusetts voters passed a ballot initiative that decriminalized the possession of small amounts of marijuana. The Massachusetts Sensible Marijuana Policy Initiative made the possession of less than one ounce (28 g) of marijuana punishable by a fine of $100 without the possessor being reported to the state's criminal history board. Minors also had to notify their parents, take a drug awareness program, and complete 10 hours of community service. Before decriminalization, people charged faced up to six months in jail and a $500 fine.

The proponents of the change argued that:

- The change would keep the existing policies regarding growing, trafficking, and driving under the influence of the drug, while protecting those caught from a tainted criminal record
- Massachusetts could save $130 million each year
- Convictions of less than one ounce (28 g) have been shown to have little or no impact on drug use

The opponents argued that the decriminalization would:

- Promote use of the drug and protect dealers
- Increase violence
- Create hazardous workplaces
- Increase car crashes

The law went into effect January 2009.

=== Medical marijuana ===
On November 6, 2012, 63% of Massachusetts voters approved Question 3, the Massachusetts Medical Marijuana Initiative. The law took effect on January 1, 2013, eliminating criminal and civil penalties for the possessions and use of up to a 60-day supply of marijuana for patients possessing a state issued registration card. With a recommendation by a physician, patients with cancer, glaucoma, and other medical conditions can receive a registration card. The law allows for 35 state-licensed non-profit dispensaries. The Massachusetts Department of Public Health had until May 1, 2013 to issue further regulations. Marijuana dispensaries were not be able to open until after the regulations had been set. The Massachusetts Medical Society opposed the bill, saying there is no scientific proof that marijuana is safe and effective. After the law passed, towns attempted to ban dispensaries. Attorney General Martha M. Coakley ruled that cities and towns cannot ban dispensaries, and can only regulate them. Complete bans would conflict with the law.

=== Recreational cannabis ===
==== Overview ====
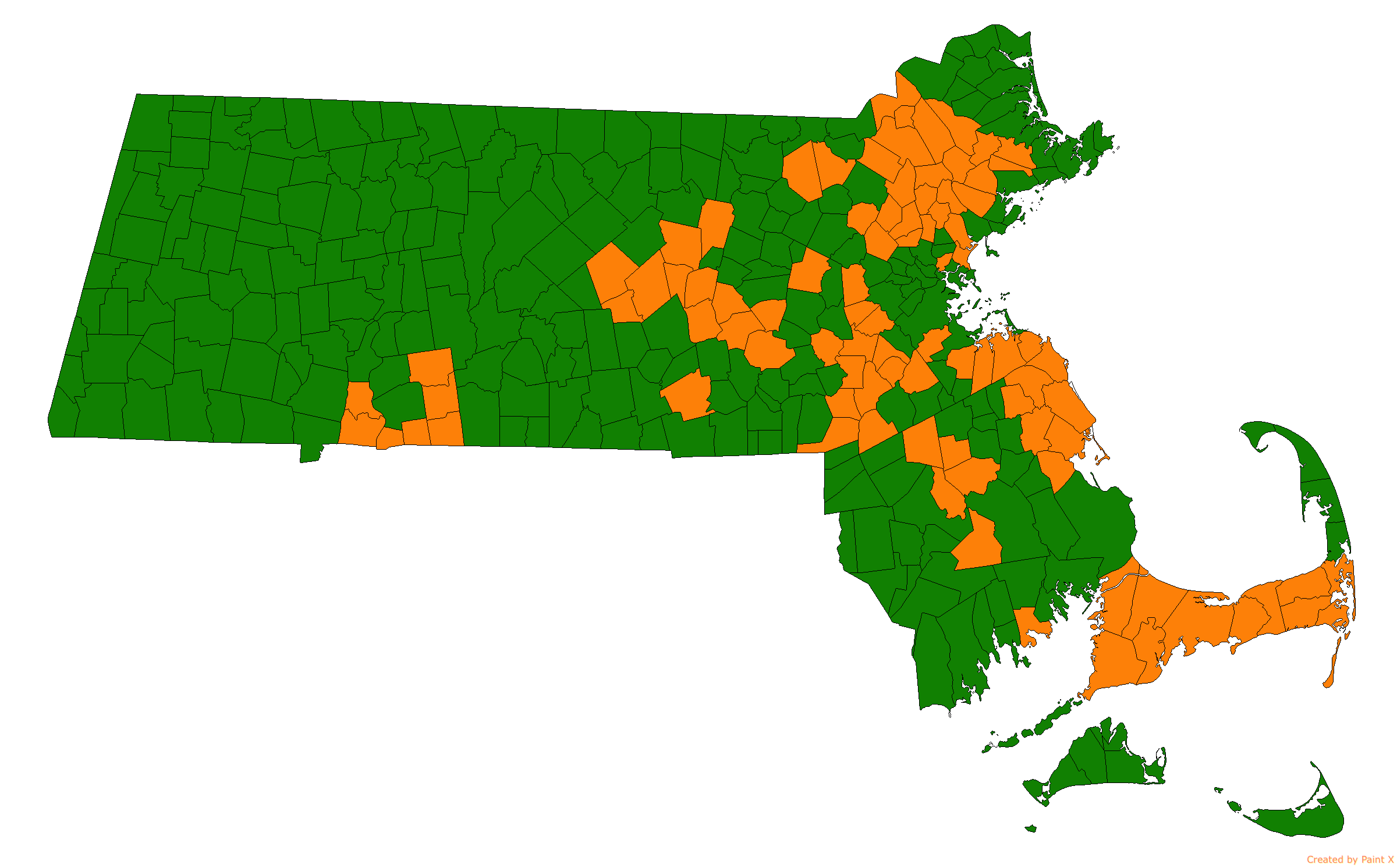
Question 4 (2016) results by town. Towns with a majority of "yes" votes in green and towns with a majority of "no" votes in orange.

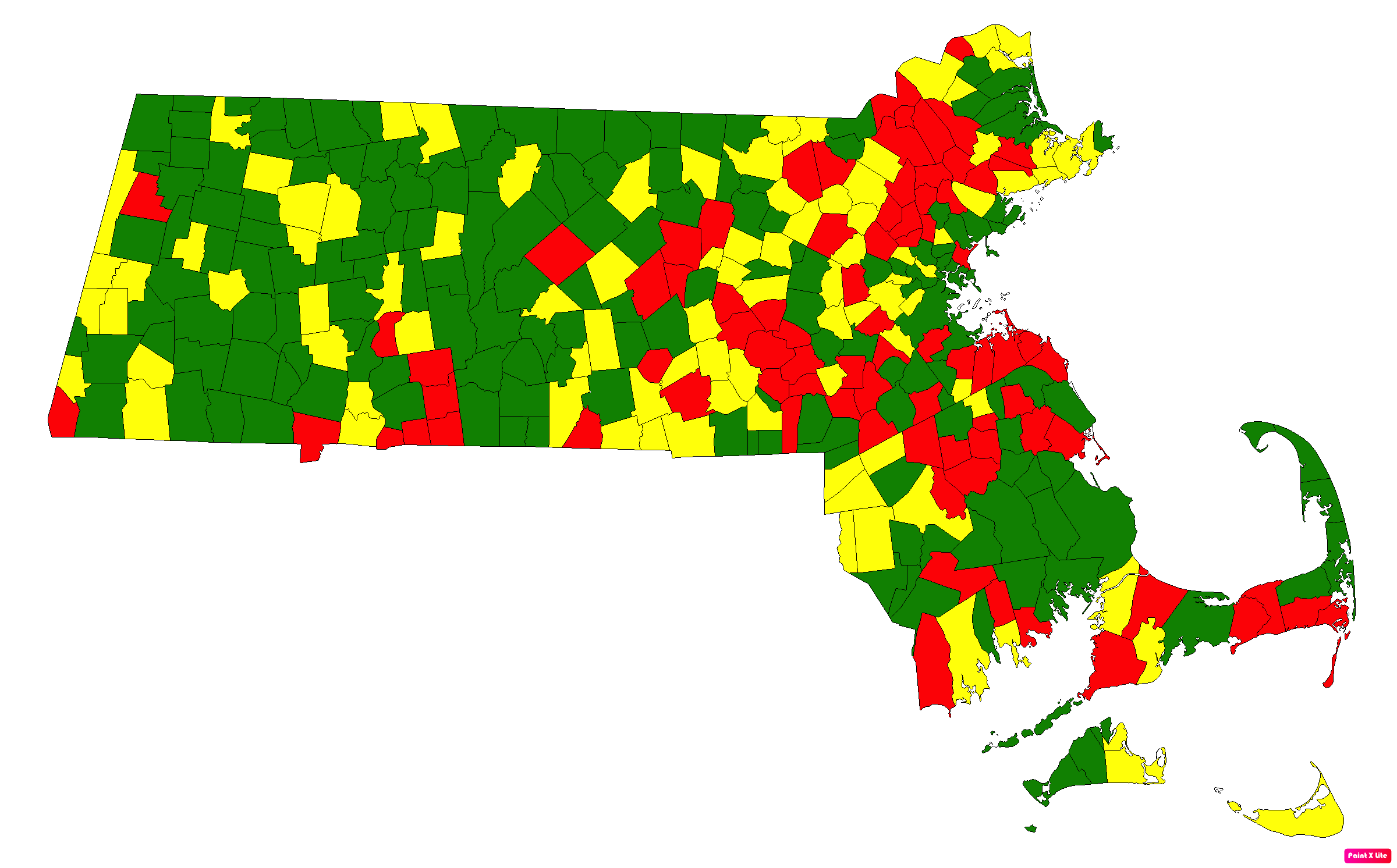
Legal status of recreational marijuana retail shops in Massachusetts by town as of October 29, 2018. Towns in red have implemented permanent bans, towns in yellow have implemented moratoriums, and towns in green have not implemented a permanent ban or a moratorium.

In the November 8, 2016 election, Massachusetts voters passed a ballot initiative (Question 4) making recreational cannabis legal in the state.

Provisions for home use and cultivation went into effect on December 15, 2016. Individuals are allowed to possess and purchase up to one ounce (28 g) at a time, and if driving it must be locked up and not openly visible. Each household can grow up to six plants, or twelve for those with more than one adult, but the plants cannot be visible from the street. Households can store up to ten ounces (280 g), or more if harvested from a home crop.

Marijuana cultivators have a several tier system for the kind of licenses they can apply for, but have the added stipulation that they can only sell to marijuana establishments like dispensaries but cannot directly sell to customers.

Smoking marijuana on public property, including parks and sidewalks, is illegal, as is smoking it while driving. An unlicensed sale (including barter) is illegal for the seller but not the buyer; giving away home-grown marijuana for free is allowed.

==== Sales ====
Governor Charlie Baker signed legislation on December 30, 2016 extending the start date for legal licensed recreational cannabis sales by six months, to July 2018. The extended ban eventually lasted 8 months past the original effective date of the initiative. The law legalizing recreational cannabis in Massachusetts was signed into effect on July 28, 2017. It is codified at G.L. Ch. 94G. The law permits an individual to carry up to 1 ounce (28 g) on their person and have up to 10 ounces (280 g) in their home.

While the recreational marijuana industry in Massachusetts was initially overseen by the Department of Health, the Cannabis Control Commission took charge of the administration of the industry in December 2018. The Commission is responsible for promulgating regulations relating to marijuana, processing business applications and issuing licenses, and creating policies and procedures which "promote and encourage full participation in the regulated marijuana industry by people from communities that have previously been disproportionately harmed by marijuana prohibition and enforcement and to positively impact those communities."

Cities and towns have the power to require permits, block recreational stores from locating in certain areas (through zoning bylaws) or from locating in the municipality at all. However, the law mandates that a ban must be approved by a local referendum if the majority of voters in the municipality were in favor of the statewide Question 4; otherwise, the city council can approve a ban on its own. Applicants must also hold a community meeting and negotiate an agreement with the host municipality in order to get a state license. As of March 2018, 59 municipalities had enacted a permanent ban, and 130 had enacted a temporary moratorium (all of which end sometime in 2018).

Retail and medical marijuana businesses must also negotiate a Community Host Agreement with the city or town in which it is located pursuant to Massachusetts Law. Cities and towns are permitted to assess a community impact fee of up to 3% of the businesses annual revenue. The agreement may be in place for no more than 5 years. However, towns and cities throughout Massachusetts have not followed these requirements.

Retail sales have a 10.75% excise tax on the marijuana, on top of the general 6.25% state sales tax, and up to a 3% local option tax, for a total of 17%–20% tax. Treasurer Deborah Goldberg unilaterally increased the excise tax to 10.75% from the 3.75% approved by voters in the language of ballot question.

The first recreational license for cultivation only was granted on Jun 21, 2018, so no sales occurred on the first day of legalization, July 1. New licensees have to wait for approval before planting, so existing medical dispensaries that expand to recreational sales have a competitive advantage, but must also wait for recreational approval. Licensing of delivery services (other than for medical marijuana) was further delayed by the Cannabis Control Commission, as was that for on-site consumption.

The first two stores opened on November 20, 2018, in Northampton and Leicester, after testing labs had been approved and begun operations, and the stores received final sign-off. During the first week of sales, excluding Thanksgiving Day where both locations were closed, $2,217,621.13 in sales was sold between the two locations.

Between November 20, 2018 and January 20, 2019, consumers purchased nearly $24 million of recreational marijuana products and the state received about $4 million in tax revenue. As of late January 2019, the state had nine stores licensed to sell recreational marijuana. By the end of the year the number had increased to 33, with more intending to open in 2020.

==== Charlie Baker administration (2015–2023) ====
Massachusetts Governor Charlie Baker, along with the Speaker of the State House of Representatives Robert DeLeo, State Attorney General Maura Healey, State Treasurer Deb Goldberg, and Boston Mayor Marty Walsh, opposed the 2016 ballot initiative to legalize the recreational use of marijuana in the state, but after its passage stated "Our view on this is the people spoke and we're going to honor that, but we need to make sure that we implement this in a way...[that protects] public safety and [ensures] that only those who are supposed to have access to these products will." The month following the ballot initiative's passage, Baker signed into law a six-month delay in the issuance of licenses for retailing marijuana in shops from January 2018 to July 2018, and in July 2017, signed into law a compromise bill that increased the excise tax on marijuana sales, expanded the size of the Cannabis Control Commission created by the ballot initiative, mandated background checks for Commission and marijuana shop employees, shifted control of the state's medical cannabis program from the Massachusetts Department of Public Health to the Commission, and created rules for town governments to restrict or ban marijuana shops based on the results of the 2016 ballot initiative within their jurisdiction.

In August 2017, Baker appointed State Senator Jennifer Flanagan to the Cannabis Control Commission and five members of the Cannabis Advisory Board that advises the Commission, and the following month, the Commission met for the first time. In January 2018, Baker proposed a $7.6 million budget for the Commission in his state budget proposal for fiscal year 2019. Also in January 2018, after U.S. Attorney General Jeff Sessions rescinded the Obama Justice Department's Cole Memorandum, as well as making personal requests to congressional leaders to not renew the Rohrabacher–Farr amendment in the previous year, Baker expressed opposition to the rescission, with his administration stating that it "believes this is the wrong decision and will review any potential impacts from any policy changes by the local U.S. Attorney's Office", and Baker reiterated his support for implementing the legal and regulated recreational marijuana market as passed by voters on the 2016 ballot initiative. In addition, Baker has also expressed concerns about federal prosecutors creating confusion and uncertainty in states where marijuana has been legalized for either medical or recreational usage, and argued that the Massachusetts U.S. Attorney's Office, instead of prosecuting local marijuana businesses, should focus its resources on resolving the opioid epidemic in the state (identifying fentanyl in particular).

After meeting with the incoming U.S. Attorney Andrew Lelling in February 2018, Baker stated the following month that Lelling "made pretty clear his primary focus is going to be on fentanyl and heroin", and that after speaking with governors in other states with legal recreational marijuana markets at a National Governors Association meeting, Baker said that he "did not get the impression any of them felt there had been a significant change in their relationship with the U.S. attorneys in their states as a result of the change in the administration... because people are pretty focused on the opioid issue." Also in February 2018, Baker argued that the Cannabis Control Commission should create its regulatory framework in incremental steps by prioritizing marijuana shops over cafés, saying "that if they try to unwrap the entire package straight out of the gate, the role and responsibility they have as an overseer and as a regulator is going to be compromised", reiterating that the purpose of legalization was to create a "safe, reliable, legal market" in the state.

In March 2018, The Boston Globe reported that 189 of the 351 Massachusetts cities and towns had either indefinitely or temporarily banned retail marijuana stores. In June 2018, Baker, along with 11 other governors, wrote a letter to Speaker of the U.S. House of Representatives Paul Ryan, U.S. House Minority Leader Nancy Pelosi, U.S. Senate Majority Leader Mitch McConnell, and U.S. Senate Minority Leader Chuck Schumer urging the passage of the bipartisan STATES Act sponsored by Massachusetts Senator Elizabeth Warren and Colorado Senator Cory Gardner. In the same month, Massachusetts Attorney General Maura Healey ruled that municipalities with moratoriums on recreational marijuana sales would be allowed to extend them for another year.

Also in June 2018, with marijuana sales in the state scheduled to begin the following month and no recreational marijuana retail licenses having been issued, Cannabis Control Commission Chairman Steven Hoffman stated that "We have said from the start that July 1 is not a legislative mandate, it's our objective and we are going to try to meet that objective, but we are going to do it right", with other Commission regulators noting that only 53 of 1,145 applications for marijuana business licenses were complete and ready for review. On July 2, 2018, Baker praised the Commission's work in creating the regulatory framework for the recreational marijuana industry in the state, and expressed support for the Commission's decision to roll out the industry more slowly, stating "It's very clear that you only get one shot to roll this out, and it's very hard to change if you don't do what you think you should have done the first time."

On the same day, the Commission voted unanimously to grant the first recreational marijuana retail license to a medical dispensary in Leicester. In November 2018, after the Cannabis Control Commission approved their final business licenses the previous month, the state's first two retail marijuana shops opened in Leicester and Northampton and the two shops recorded $2.2 million in sales of marijuana products during their first week. The following month, the Cannabis Control Commission approved licenses for retail stores in Salem, Easthampton, and Wareham, and Cannabis Control Commission Chair Steven Hoffman estimated that the state would begin to see four to eight new retail stores opening each month.

==== Bans and moratoriums by town ====
As of March 18, 2020, the following 106 towns had either a permanent ban (102) or a moratorium (4) currently in place on retail marijuana stores:

- Barnstable County (6 bans)
  - Bourne (ban)
  - Chatham (ban)
  - Dennis (ban)
  - Falmouth (ban)
  - Harwich (ban)
  - Sandwich (ban lifted by vote, May 2022)
  - Yarmouth (ban)
- Berkshire County (3 bans, 1 moratorium)
  - Florida (moratorium till 6/30/2019, unknown as of 3/18/2020)
  - Monterey (ban)
  - Mount Washington (ban)
  - New Marlborough (ban)
- Bristol County (5 bans)
  - Acushnet (ban)
  - Easton (ban)
  - Freetown (ban)
  - Raynham (ban)
  - Westport (ban)
- Essex County (15 bans)
  - Andover (ban)
  - Boxford (ban)
  - Danvers (ban)
  - Essex (ban)
  - Groveland (ban)
  - Hamilton (ban)
  - Lawrence (ban)
  - Lynnfield (ban)
  - Merrimac (ban)
  - Methuen (ban)
  - Middleton (ban)
  - North Andover (ban)
  - Peabody (ban)
  - Topsfield (ban)
  - Wenham (ban)
- Franklin County (2 moratoriums)
  - Hawley (moratorium till 12/31/2018, planning as of 3/18/2020)
  - Shutesbury (moratorium till 12/31/2018, unknown as of 3/18/2020)
- Hampshire County (2 bans, 1 moratorium)
  - Goshen (moratorium till 12/31/2018, unknown as of 3/18/2020)
  - South Hadley (ban)
  - Westhampton (ban)
- Hampden County (8 bans)
  - Agawam (ban)
  - East Longmeadow (ban)
  - Hampden (ban)
  - Longmeadow (ban)
  - Ludlow (ban)
  - Southwick (ban)
  - West Springfield (ban)
  - Wilbraham (ban)
- Middlesex County (21 bans)
  - Acton (ban)
  - Ashland (ban)
  - Bedford (ban)
  - Burlington (ban)
  - Carlisle (ban)
  - Chelmsford (ban)
  - Concord (ban)
  - Holliston (ban)
  - Hopkinton (ban)
  - Lexington (ban)
  - Lincoln (ban)
  - North Reading (ban)
  - Reading (ban)
  - Stoneham (ban)
  - Stow (ban)
  - Wayland (ban)
  - Westford (ban)
  - Weston (ban)
  - Wilmington (ban)
  - Winchester (ban)
  - Woburn (ban)
- Norfolk County (16 bans)
  - Bellingham (ban)
  - Braintree (ban)
  - Cohasset (ban)
  - Dedham (ban)
  - Foxborough (ban)
  - Medfield (ban)
  - Medway (ban)
  - Milton (ban)
  - Needham (ban)
  - Norfolk (ban)
  - Norwood (ban)
  - Stoughton (ban)
  - Walpole (ban)
  - Wellesley (ban)
  - Westwood (ban)
  - Weymouth (ban)
- Plymouth County (10 bans)
  - Bridgewater (ban)
  - Duxbury (ban)
  - East Bridgewater (ban)
  - Hanover (ban)
  - Hingham (ban)
  - Hull (ban)
  - Pembroke (ban)
  - Scituate (ban)
  - West Bridgewater (ban)
  - Whitman (ban)
- Suffolk County (1 ban)
  - Revere (ban)
- Worcester County (14 bans)
  - Auburn (ban)
  - Barre (ban)
  - Holden (ban)
  - Lancaster (ban)
  - Milford (ban)
  - Northborough (ban)
  - Southborough (ban)
  - Southbridge (ban)
  - Spencer (ban)
  - Sterling (ban)
  - Sutton (ban)
  - Upton (ban)
  - Webster (ban)
  - Westborough (ban)

=== Nantucket and Martha's Vineyard ===
Nantucket and Martha's Vineyard are islands which are separated from the mainland by federal waters. The state medical marijuana law requires a dispensary in every county; each island is its own county, but the problem of federal jurisdiction has created a legal hurdle to shipping mainland-grown product to the islands. State law requires marijuana grown on the island to be tested in state labs, which are located on the mainland, so crossing through federal jurisdiction is also a problem for growers.

Though the Steamship Authority is run by the state, anyone transporting marijuana by sea could be subject to arrest by the United States Coast Guard. Similar problems exist in transporting marijuana to and from islands in Hawaii and Washington State, but as of 2018 it appears the Coast Guard has not taken enforcement action against those legally possessing marijuana under state law, despite asserting it will do so.

The Federal Aviation Administration could terminate the license of a pilot knowingly transporting marijuana, but there is some legal question as to whether air transport of marijuana authorized by state law is acceptable under an FAA regulation with ambiguous wording. The Transportation Security Administration does not have the legal authority to enforce federal law, only to protect the security of aircraft. Illegal drugs found by TSA at airport security checkpoints (which are not in the scope of what they are searching for in the first place) are referred to local law enforcement; in Massachusetts possession of under one ounce (28 g) is legal, so state police will take no action. People transporting marijuana by plane are subject to arrest by the Federal Bureau of Investigation, Drug Enforcement Administration, Federal Air Marshal Service, though in practice minor violations are typically referred to local law enforcement.

=== Public opinion ===
Public opinion on the legalization of recreational marijuana in Massachusetts
Poll source	Date(s) administered	Sample size	Margin of error	% support	% opposition	% Undecided/Don't Know
Western New England University	October 23–November 2, 2016	417 LV	± 4.5%	61%	34%	5%
Suffolk University/The Boston Globe	October 24–26, 2016	500 LV	± 4.4%	48.8%	42.4%	8.8%
WBUR/MassINC Polling Group	October 13–16, 2016	502 LV	± 4.4%	55%	40%	5%
Western New England University	September 24–October 3, 2016	403 LV	± 5.0%	52%	42%	6%
Western New England University	September 24–October 3, 2016	467 RV	± 5.0%	55%	39%	6%
WBZ/UMass Amherst	September 15–20, 2016	700 LV	± 4.3%	53%	40%	7%
WBZ/UMass Amherst	September 15–20, 2016	800 RV	± 4.1%	51%	40%	9%
WBUR/MassINC Polling Group	September 7–10, 2016	506 LV	± 4.4%	50%	45%	5%
Gravis Marketing/Jobs First	July 12–13, 2016	901 RV	± 3.3%	41%	51%	9%
Suffolk University/The Boston Globe	May 2–5, 2016	500 LV	± 4.4%	43.0%	45.8%	11%
Western New England University	April 1–10, 2016	497 RV	± 4%	57%	35%	7%
UMass Amherst/WBZ	February 19–25, 2016	891 RV	± 4.1%	53%	40%	7%
Emerson College	October 16–18, 2015	629 RV	± 3.9%	40.5%	47.6%	11.9%
The Boston Globe	June 22–24/June 29-July 1, 2014	601 LV	± 4%	48%	47%	5%
WBUR/MassINC Polling Group	May 16–18, 2014	504 LV	± 4.4%	49%	42%	9%
WBUR/MassINC Polling Group	March 14–16, 2014	500 LV	± 4.4%	48%	41%	10%
Boston Herald/Suffolk University	January 29-February 3, 2014	600 LV	± 4.0%	53.17%	37.17%	9.67%
Western New England University	November 5-November 11, 2013	467 RV	± 4.5%	39%	52%	9%

== Culture ==
=== Usage ===
Marijuana is the most common illegal drug used in the United States. A 2007 survey showed that over 100 million US citizens over the age of 12 have used marijuana. More teenagers are current users of marijuana than cigarettes. The following chart shows percentages of Massachusetts' population's marijuana usage using data from the Substance Abuse and Mental Health Services Administration based on surveys from 2010 and 2011.

Ages	12+	12-17	18-25	26+
Past Year	15.89	18.31	42.33	10.98
Past Month	9.96	11.32	28.42	6.56

=== Cultivation ===
Assessing the total cultivation of marijuana in the United States was difficult, and even more difficult by a statewide basis due to the now diminishing illegality of the drug. In the ballot of 2016, growing and cultivating the plant was legalized. In 2006 it was estimated that there was 22 million pounds of domestic crop. Including the imported crop from Mexico and Canada, Dr. Jon Gettman estimates there is approximately $100 billion worth of crop available in the United States. Gettman's study, Marijuana Production in the United States, shows that Massachusetts ranks 44th marijuana cultivation by state, producing 12,700 pounds (5,800 kg) of marijuana worth $20 million, though this statistic was realized prior to the legalization of recreational marijuana and the large-scale commercial grow operations that supply the substantial recreational cannabis market that exists as of 2021.

=== Events ===
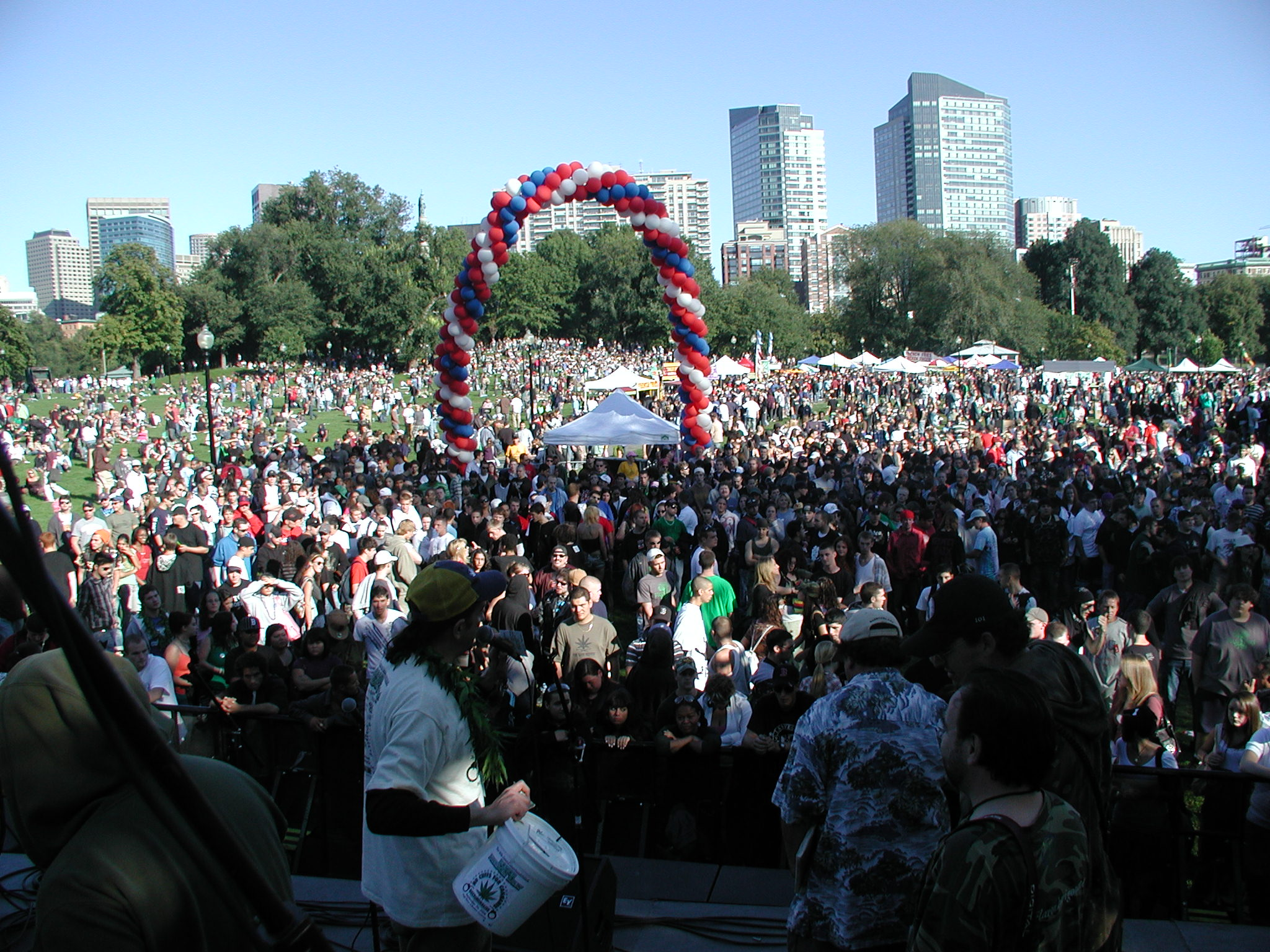
2008 Freedom Rally in Boston

The Boston Freedom Rally is an annual event on the third Saturday in September. It is the second largest annual gathering demanding marijuana law reform in the United States. The Massachusetts Cannabis Reform Coalition organizes the event. The event began in 1989, and has been held on the Boston Common since 1992. The city of Boston has tried to stop the event, but has been unable to do so.

== 2022 overhauls and reforms ==
In August 2022, the Governor of Massachusetts signed an extensive bill into law that overhauls and reforms the legal cannabis industry within Massachusetts - plus permanently implements the "Massachusetts Cannabis Control Commission". However the Governor item-line vetoed a study into medical cannabis usage by students within schools.

== See also ==
- Cannabis in Oregon
- Cannabis in California
- Cannabis in the United States
- Massachusetts Medical Marijuana Initiative
- Massachusetts Sensible Marijuana Policy Initiative
- Massachusetts Cannabis Reform Coalition
- Law of Massachusetts
