= Cannabis rights =

Legal protections for marijuana consumers

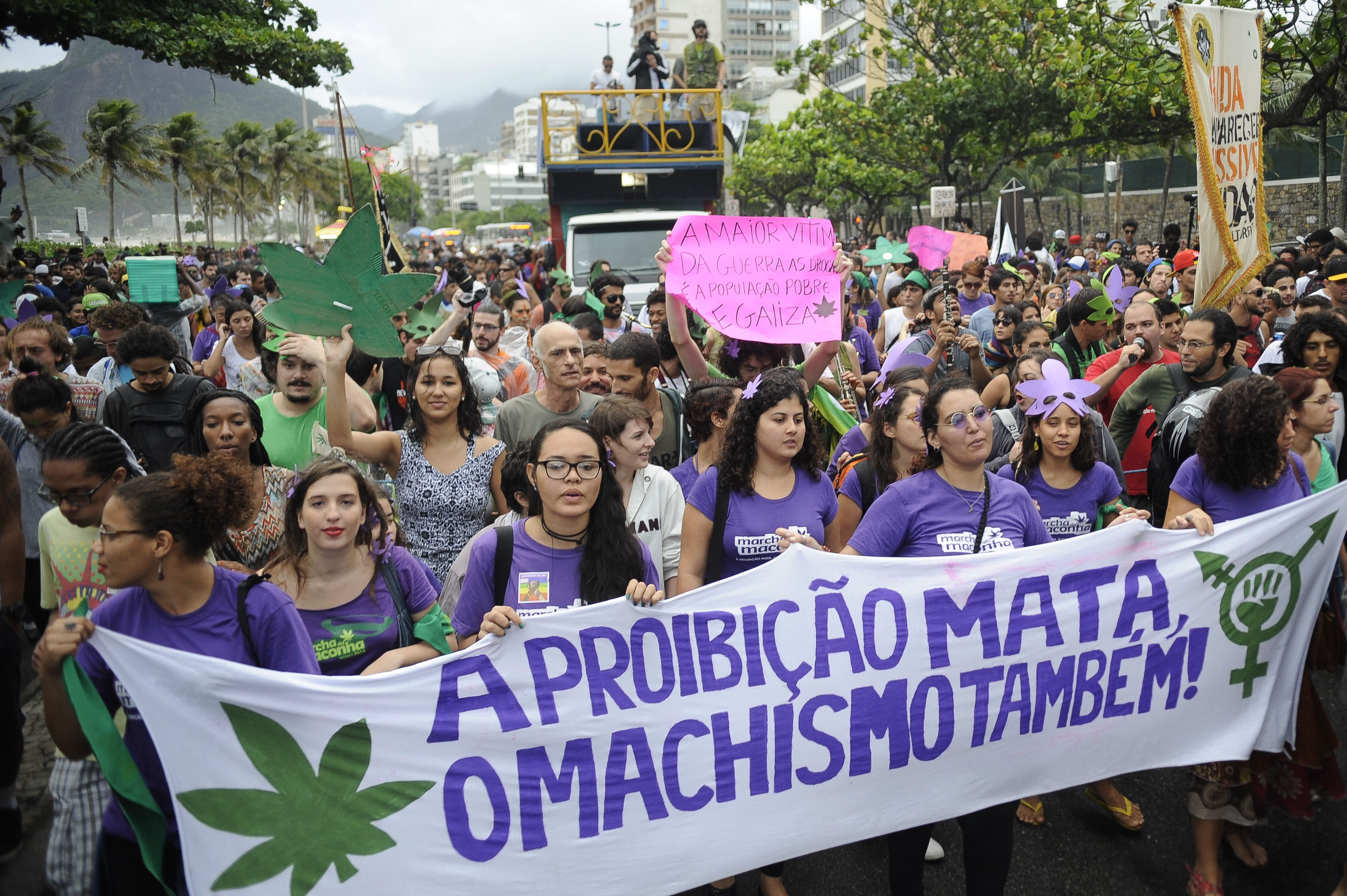
A cannabis rights demonstration in 2014, part of the Global Marijuana March in Rio de Janeiro

Cannabis rights or marijuana rights (sometimes more specifically cannabis consumer rights or stoner rights) are individual civil rights that vary by jurisdiction. The rights of people who consume cannabis include the right to be free from employment discrimination and housing discrimination.

Anti-cannabis laws include civil infractions and fines, imprisonment, and even the death penalty.

== Legality ==
The use of cannabis for recreational purposes is prohibited in most countries. Many have adopted a policy of decriminalization to make simple possession a non-criminal offense (often similar to a minor traffic violation). Others have much more severe penalties such as some Asian and Middle Eastern countries where possession of even small amounts is punished by imprisonment for several years.

== Social movement ==
The movement around cannabis laws and rights has been growing since as early as the 1960s. Multiple organizations both for and against cannabis usage have been created and merged over the past 60 years as the country has changed and perception of marijuana rights has changed. One pro-marijuana group is NORML (The National Organization for the Reform of Marijuana Laws). The conversation about cannabis rights has shifted from picket signs declaring "Pot is fun," to being about health and social justice. It's been noted that African-American communities may be suffering the most from the continued prohibition of cannabis, although consumption rates are approximately the same as white citizens. Arrests for African-Americans are 3.73 times higher in comparison. Activists hope to see those numbers decrease with gained rights.

== American history ==
Until the 20th century, there were no prohibitions in the U.S. against growing and consuming cannabis. By the mid-20th century, possession of marijuana was a crime in every U.S. state (and most other countries). In 1996, the passing of Proposition 215 by California voters restored limited rights for medical cannabis patients in the state. Other states and countries have since joined California in guarding rights of cannabis consumers.

In the United States, much is unclear about cannabis rights because despite state laws, cannabis remains federally illegal. Consequently, cannabis consumers do not belong to a protected class. Courts will address the issues surrounding housing and employment law, and disability discrimination.

=== State vs. federal ===
As of 2019 in the United States, eleven states and the District of Columbia have legalized medical and recreational cannabis, with 25 more states decriminalizing the drug. Fourteen state and federal laws still classifies cannabis as illegal, placing cannabis as a "Schedule 1" drug. Being federally illegal, profits cannot be handled through federally-insured banks (including checks or deposits), so cannabis retailers are forced to use cash or remain vague about business practices.

=== Medical use ===
In the United States, the use of cannabis for medical purposes is legal in 33 states, four (out of five) permanently inhabited U.S. territories, and the District of Columbia.^{[11]} An additional 14 states have more restrictive laws allowing the use of low-THC products.^{[11]} Cannabis remains illegal at the federal level by way of the Controlled Substances Act, under which cannabis is classified as a Schedule I drug with a high potential for abuse and no accepted medical use. In December 2014, the Rohrabacher–Farr amendment was signed into law, prohibiting the Justice Department from prosecuting individuals acting in accordance with state medical cannabis laws.

An international argument for medical usage includes the right to health, as guaranteed by the International Covenant on Economic, Social, and Cultural Rights. What determines "health" or "healthy" is disputed between individuals and governmental bodies.

== Indonesian history ==
There were around two million cannabis users in Indonesia in 2014, reported by the National Anti-Narcotics Agency (Badan Narkotika Nasional - BNN). This makes cannabis the most popular drug in Indonesia followed by amphetamine-type stimulants (ATS) such as methamphetamine (shabu) and ecstasy. Most of the cannabis is distributed by the western province of Indonesia called Aceh. 37,923 people were imprisoned because of cannabis between 2009 and 2012. Twenty-six people were imprisoned, on average, each day. Because cannabis is the most common drug, consuming of cannabis goes up to 66 percent than other drugs in the country. The death penalty is given to the people who grow cannabis, or a minimum fine of $550,000, based on the National Anti-Narcoticts (BNN) law.

== Religious use ==
Different religions have varying stances on the use of cannabis, historically and in modern times. In ancient history, cannabis, cannabis was used as an entheogen, particularly in the Indian subcontinent where the tradition continues in certain rituals. In the contemporary era, Rastafari communities often use cannabis as a sacred herb; for example, in Antigua, Rastafarians have legally gained the right to cultivate and ritually smoke cannabis as part of their spiritual practice. In the modern era Rastafari use cannabis as a sacred herb. Meanwhile, religions with prohibitions against intoxicants, such as Islam, Buddhism, Bahai, Latter-day Saints (Mormons), and others have opposed the use of cannabis by members, or in some cases opposed the liberalization of cannabis laws. Other groups, such as some Protestant and Jewish factions, have supported the use of medicinal cannabis.

== See also ==
- Civil and political rights
- Civil liberties
- Cognitive liberty
- Consumer protection
- Drug liberalization
- Drug policy
- Freedom from discrimination
- Legalization
- List of cannabis rights leaders
- List of cannabis rights organizations
