= DrugWarRant =

Website

- Website type: Blog
- Creator: Peter Guither
- Website: http://www.drugwarrant.com/

DrugWarRant is a website created by activist Peter Guither that specifically advocate the termination of war on drugs in United States. It has a Bulletin Board System, a blog, and other functions, including a comprehensive guide to the Supreme Court case Gonzales v. Raich, a case dealing with medical marijuana and states' rights. The site caused controversy when, in 2004, Illinois Congressman Jerry Weller used the site's endorsement of his opponent Tari Renner in order to accuse him of supporting drug legalization. Renner denounced Weller's vicious negative campaign, and the site also gave a disclaimer.

In 2006, when the Drug Enforcement Administration tried to assert a connection between illegal drugs and terrorism, the blog rebuked the Agency, saying the war on drugs was actually causing worse crime and terrorism.

Notably, the site features a list of "drug war victims", commemorating people who it says have died because of the excess of drug prohibition.

The founder of DrugWarRant, Peter Guither, is a retired assistant to the dean of College of Fine Arts at Illinois State University and the founder of performance/photography project The Living Canvas.

== See also ==
- Drug Policy Alliance
- Marijuana Policy Project
- National Organization for the Reform of Marijuana Laws
- November Coalition
- Students for Sensible Drug Policy
