= Minnesota NORML =

Cannabis organization

- The organization's logo

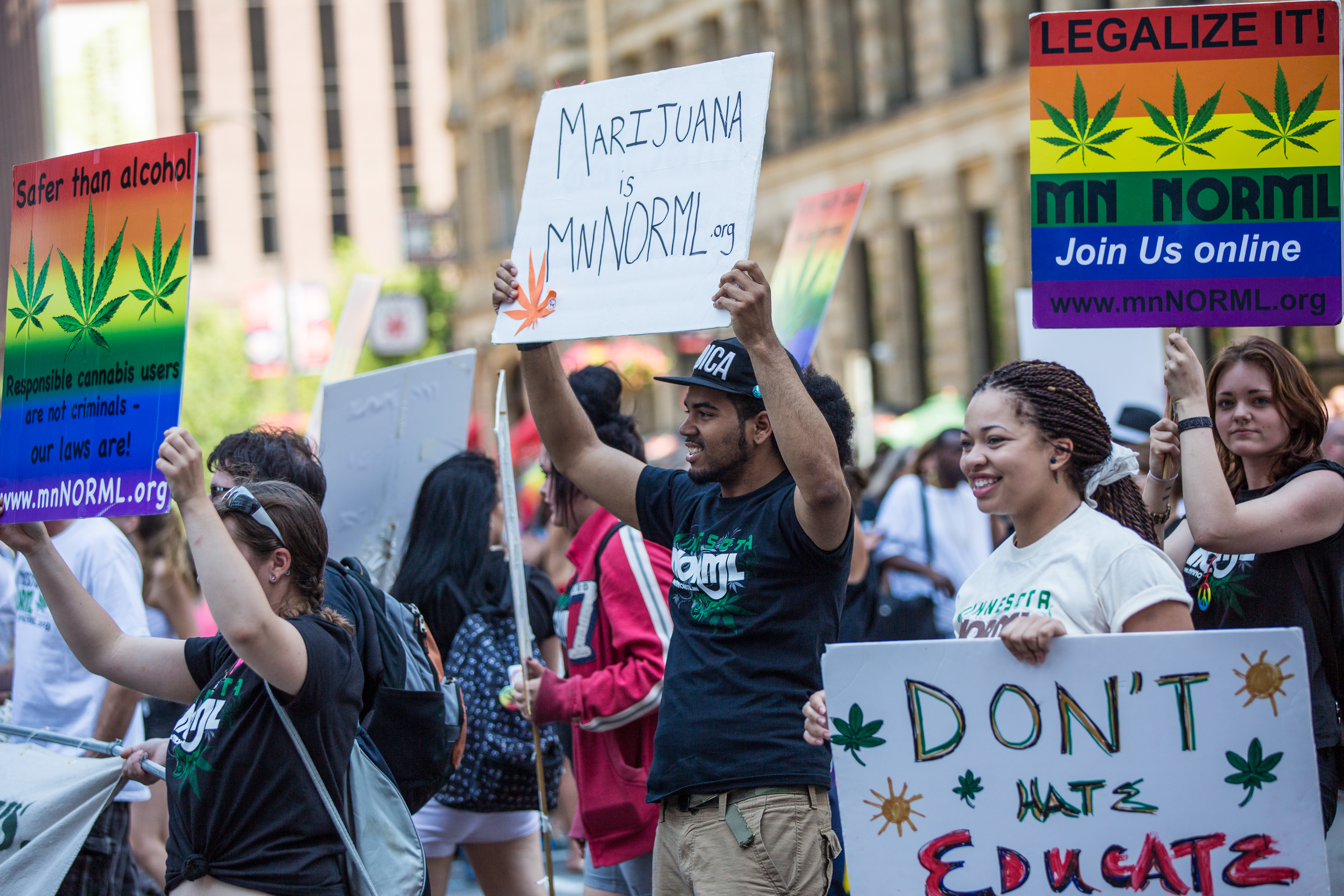
- Minnesota NORML representation and signage at the Twin Cities Pride Parade in downtown Minneapolis, 2013
- Parent organization: National Organization for the Reform of Marijuana Laws (NORML)
- Website: minnnorml.org

Minnesota NORML is the National Organization for the Reform of Marijuana Laws (NORML) affiliate for the U.S. state of Minnesota. As of 2017, Michael Ford served as the organization's executive director.

== History ==
Tim Davis served as Minnesota NORML's director in the 1980s and 1990s.

In 2014, Randy Quast was executive director of the Minnesota chapter of NORML. In 2016, Quast was appointed interim director of national NORML, replacing outgoing director Allen St. Pierre.

In 2015, Marcus Harcus served as Minnesota NORML's executive director.

== See also ==
- Cannabis in Minnesota
- Grassroots–Legalize Cannabis Party
- List of cannabis organizations
