= Patients Out of Time =

American medical cannabis rights group

Patients Out of Time (POT) is an American medical cannabis nonprofit organization and patients rights group, established in 1995.

In 2013, the U.S. Court of Appeals for the District of Columbia Circuit ruled in a case challenging the Drug Enforcement Administration's classification of cannabis as a Schedule I drug. The lawsuit was filed by a group of organizations and patients, including Americans for Safe Access, the Coalition to Reschedule Cannabis, and Patients Out of Time.
