= Peter Reuter =

American criminologist and economist (born 1944)

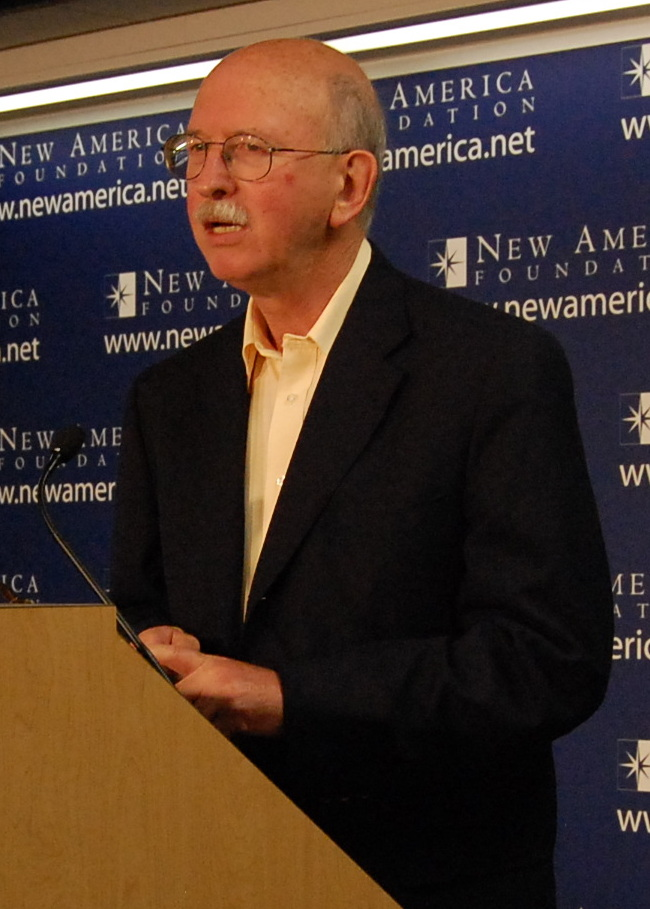
- Born: December 4, 1944 (age 81)
- Education: University of New South Wales (B.A. with honors, 1966), Yale University (M. Phil., 1971; Ph.D., 1980)
- Known for: Work on drug policy
- Scientific career
- Fields: Criminology, economics
- Workplaces: University of Maryland, College Park
- Thesis: The organization of illegal markets: an exploratory study (1980)

Peter Reuter (born December 4, 1944) is an American criminologist and economist. He is a professor in both the School of Public Policy and in the Department of Criminology at the University of Maryland. In 2020, he was appointed University of Maryland Distinguished Professor. Since 1985, his research has focused mainly on alternative drug policies in the United States and Western Europe. In 1988, he was described by Peter Kerr of the New York Times as "one of the few economists who studies illegal drug markets."

== Early life ==
Reuter grew up in Australia, where his father, Fritz Reuter, was a professor at the University of New South Wales. Reuter graduated from the University of New South Wales in 1966.

== Career ==
After receiving his Ph.D. in economics from Yale University in 1980, Reuter began working at the RAND Corporation in 1981 as a senior economist in their Washington, D.C. office. In 1989, he founded the RAND Corporation's Drug Policy Research Center, and served as its director until 1993, when he left RAND to become a professor of criminology at the University of Maryland.
