= Law Enforcement Action Partnership =

American drug policy reform organization

- Abbreviation: LEAP
- Established: 2002 (24 years ago)
- Legal status: 501(c)(3) organization
- Headquarters: Medford
- Website: lawenforcementactionpartnership.org

The Law Enforcement Action Partnership (LEAP), formerly Law Enforcement Against Prohibition, is a U.S.-based nonprofit organization group of current and former police, judges, prosecutors, and other criminal justice professionals who use their expertise to advance drug policy and criminal justice solutions that enhance public safety. The organization is modeled after Vietnam Veterans Against the War.

The organization transitioned from Law Enforcement Against Prohibition into the Law Enforcement Action Partnership in January 2017. They previously focused on ending the war on drugs and now discuss a broad range of issues relating to policing and criminal justice - from procedural justice practices to reducing recidivism. Their overarching message is about reducing crime and violence and improving public safety.

== History ==
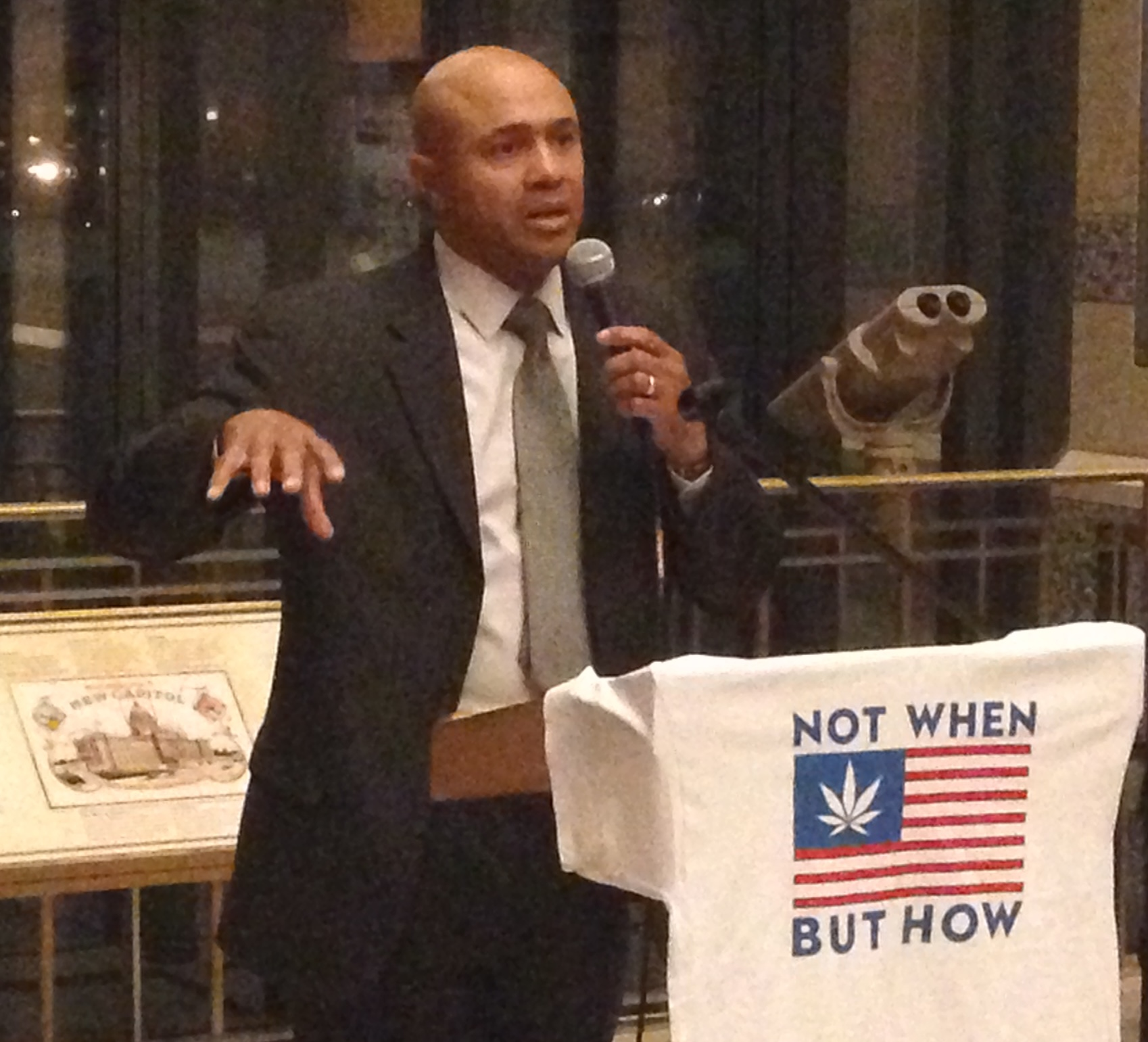
Former Executive Director, Neill Franklin speaking at MN NORML event in 2014

LEAP was founded by five police officers in 2002. The organization works to educate law enforcement, legislators, and the public about ways to bring positive change in the criminal justice system.

== 5 key issue areas ==
=== Police-community relations ===
LEAP believes the key to improving police effectiveness is to go back to the fundamental principals of modern policing laid down by Robert Peel and improve public safety by increasing police-community trust.

Speakers advocate for solutions including treating officers for post-traumatic stress disorder; expanding police training and pay; addressing racial disparities in the justice system; abolishing stop-and-frisk practices; limiting police militarization to active shooter, hostage, and barricade incidents; ending civil asset forfeiture; and abolishing volume-based performance measures such as arrest quotas.

=== Incarceration ===
LEAP advocates for alternatives to arrest and incarceration as a means of reducing crime. They support reducing the use of mandatory minimum sentences, increasing the use of effective pre-booking diversion programs, increasing the use of restorative justice conferences, reforming the money-bail system, and reforming parole and probation systems. The group aims to reduce collateral consequences caused by arrest and incarceration, reduce racial disparities in sentencing and punishment, and reduce felony disenfranchisement.

=== Harm reduction ===
LEAP supports harm reduction programs, which reduce the negative personal and societal consequences of drug use, including Supervised Injection Facilities, Law Enforcement Assisted Diversion (LEAD), heroin-assisted treatment, Medication Assisted Treatment, syringe exchange programs, expanded naloxone access, and treatment on demand. Until 2020 LEAP was the fiscal sponsor for the Influence Foundation, which operates the harm reduction publication Filter.

=== The war on drugs ===
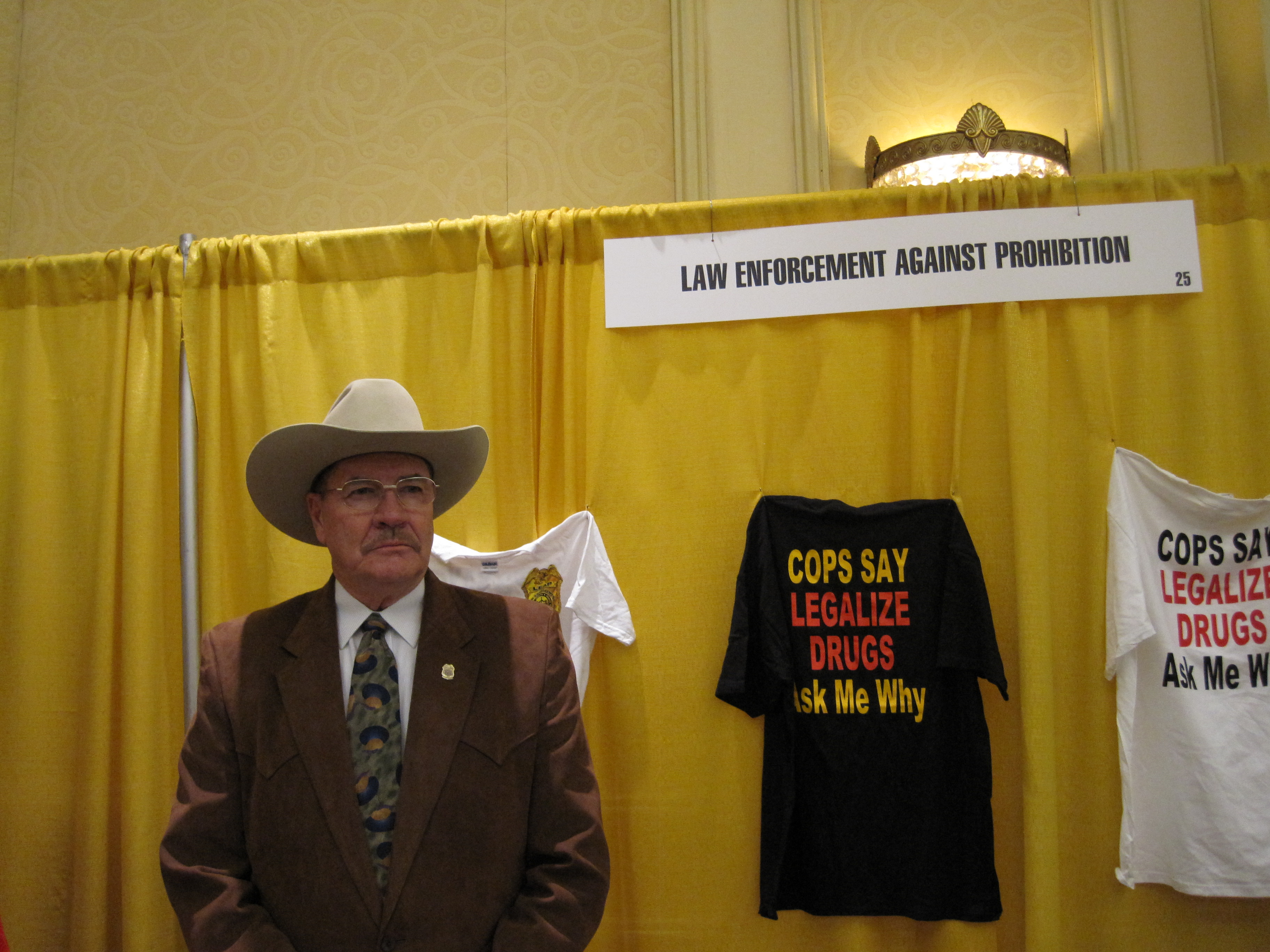
Law Enforcement Against Prohibition at the 8th National Harm Reduction Conference in Austin, Texas, in November 2010

LEAP pushes to end the war on drugs and legalize and regulate all drugs from a public health perspective as a means of reducing death, disease, and addiction associated with drug use and illegal drug sales.

=== Global issues ===
LEAP is dedicated to studying international criminal justice issues and practical solutions. LEAP looks to countries including Switzerland and Portugal for pioneering innovative drug policies focused on public health and safety.

== Membership ==
=== Speakers bureau ===
Representatives of the Law Enforcement Action Partnership are trained to speak with audiences and media outlets on behalf of the organization. They include current and former/retired police officers, military police officers, judges, prosecutors, prison wardens and other corrections officials, parole and probation officers, and FBI and DEA agents.

=== Media ===
Each year, speakers conduct hundreds of interviews with outlets across the country, including AP, Newsweek, BBC, The Washington Post, FOX News, CNN, The Atlantic, The Intercept, Reason magazine, The Hill, The Guardian, The Washington Times, The Los Angeles Times, and others.

== Funding ==
LEAP has received funding from tobacco companies. In 2017 more than a third of its funding came from Reynolds American.

== See also ==
- Drug Policy Alliance
- DrugWarRant
- Freedom of thought
- NORML (National Organization for the Reform of Marijuana Laws)
- Prohibition
- Students for Sensible Drug Policy
- Doctors for Cannabis Regulation
