= 2016 Massachusetts Question 4 =

Marijuana legalization initiative

Question 4
- Massachusetts Legalization, Regulation and Taxation of Marijuana Initiative

Results
Choice	Votes	%
Yes	1,769,328	53.66%
No	1,528,219	46.34%
Valid votes	3,297,547	100.00%
Invalid or blank votes	0	0.00%
Total votes	3,297,547	100.00%

Yes
90–100%
80–90%
70–80%
60–70%
50–60%
No
70–80%
60–70%
50–60%
Other
Tie

The Massachusetts Legalization, Regulation and Taxation of Marijuana Initiative also known as Question 4, was an indirect initiated state statute question to legalize, regulate and tax recreational marijuana that appeared on the November 8, 2016 Massachusetts general election ballot.

- A "yes" vote supports this proposal to legalize marijuana, but regulate it similar to alcoholic beverages.
- A "no" vote opposes this proposal to legalize recreational marijuana, keeping only medical marijuana legal.

The proposal was approved with 53.59% of the vote.

== Delays in implementation ==
In December 2016, the state legislature voted to delay the opening date for recreational marijuana stores in Massachusetts by six months. The opening was delayed from January 2017 to summer and eventually to November 20, 2018, the first day of state-licensed cannabis sales in Massachusetts.

== See also ==
- List of 2016 United States cannabis reform proposals
