= November Coalition =

- Founded: 1997
- Founder: Nora Callahan
- Purpose: Ending war on drugs, protect prisoners' rights
- Location: Colville, Washington
- Region served: United States
- Key people: Martha Christman
- Website: november.org

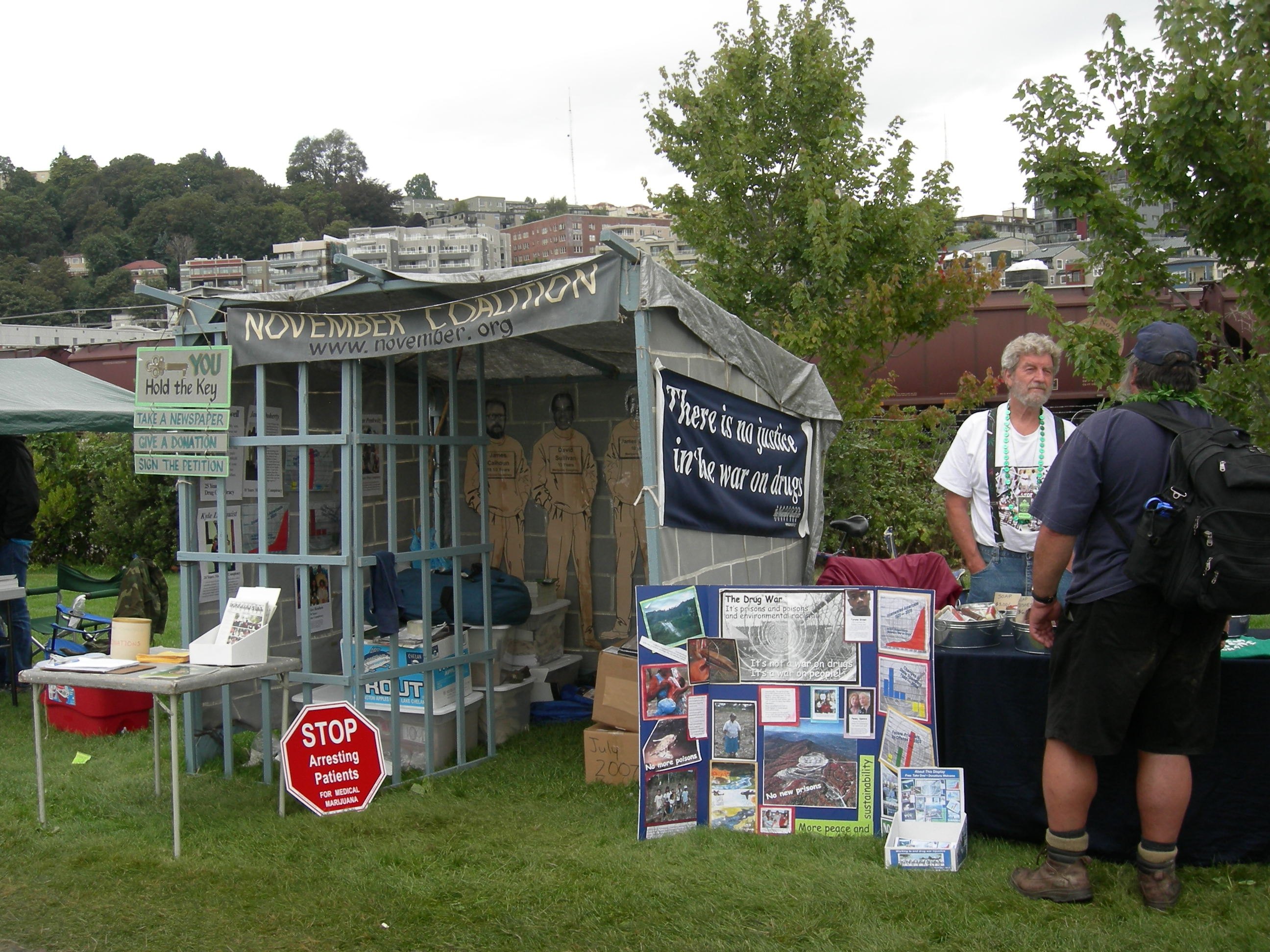
November Coalition booth at 2007 Seattle Hempfest.

The November Coalition is a non-profit grassroots organization, founded in 1997, which fights against the war on drugs and for the rights of the prisoners incarcerated as the effect of that war. It publishes a bulletin called Razor Wire.

== Tyrone Brown ==
The November Coalition was involved in the advocacy for Tyrone Brown's release. Brown, an African American Texan, has been sentenced to life imprisonment for smoking marijuana. On March 9, 2007, Governor Rick Perry signed a conditional pardon which released Brown under supervision.

== See also ==
- Prisoners' rights
- Drug Policy Alliance
- Students for Sensible Drug Policy
- National Organization for Reform of Marijuana Laws
- Marijuana Policy Project
