= Legalization =

Process of removing legal prohibitions

Legalization is the process of removing a legal prohibition against something which is currently not legal.

Legalization is a process often applied to what are regarded, by those working towards legalization, as victimless crimes, of which one example is the consumption of illegal drugs (see drug legalization).

Legalization should be contrasted with decriminalization, which removes criminal charges from an action, whereas legalization also adds in regulation, such as a minimum age to legally purchase, poses and use a drug like cannabis.

Proponents of libertarianism support legalization of what they regard as victimless crimes, such as recreational drug and alcohol use, gun ownership, and prostitution.

In U. S. immigration context, the term "legalization" is colloquially used to refer to a process whereby a person illegally present in the country can obtain lawful permanent residence. Since 1929, the US law has provided the legalization procedure known as registry, which simply requires the applicant to prove that he has continuously resided in the country since before a certain specified "registry date" (originally, 1921; presently, 1972), and is not inadmissible on other grounds (criminal history, etc.). One legalization proposal that was widely discussed recently was the DREAM Act.

== See also ==
- Drug liberalization
- Freedom of speech
- Internet freedom
- Legal prostitution
- Legality of cannabis
- Regulation
