= Students for Sensible Drug Policy =

International civic engagement and advocacy organization

- Abbreviation: SSDP
- Established: 1988 (38 years ago)
- Legal status: 501(c)(3) organization
- Headquarters: Washington, D.C.
- Website: www.ssdp.org

Students for Sensible Drug Policy (SSDP) is an international nonprofit organization advocacy and education organization with a focus on drug policy, war on drugs, marijuana legalization, psychedelics, juvenile justice and youth rights, drug decriminalization, and criminal justice reform. SSDP promotes global youth civic engagement as a tool in reforming drug policy.

== History ==
Students for Sensible Drug Policy (SSDP) was founded in 1998 by students at Rochester Institute of Technology, George Washington University, and American University.

SSDP has expanded from a single chapter in upstate New York created by a handful of students to a network of over 150 chapters worldwide[data missing].

== Organization ==
=== Board ===
SSDP is governed by a board of directors and a board of trustees, a designated body of the board of directors. Together, they are responsible for crafting strategy for the organization, overseeing compliance and financial affairs, and overseeing SSDP’s Executive Director. At least two-thirds of the members of SSDP's board of directors are students or young people elected by SSDP's chapters each year during the organization's national Congress. As of 2025, Kat Murti is the Executive Director and Karley Snyder is the Board Chair.

=== Campus chapters ===
SSDP is made up of students and community members organized on college and high school campuses across the world.

== Activities ==
=== Policy reforms for cannabis and psychedelics ===
Students and chapters work on marijuana policy reform at the local, state, and federal levels by supporting legislation and ballot initiatives for decriminalization, medical marijuana, adult-use taxation and regulation, and social equity measures for communities disproportionately targeted by marijuana prohibition. SSDP also provides resources for its members to advocate for psychedelic policy reform, such as psychedelic therapy programs and allowing the research of currently prohibited psychedelic substances by researchers. The organisation encourages chapters to create and support campaigns to decriminalize simple drug possession and other low-level crimes associated with drug use.

SSDP advocates globally for policy reforms, and is a observer NGO accredited to the Economic and Social Council and its functional commissions. As such, SSDP has been advocating for policy reform and youth inclusion at the Commission on Narcotic Drugs, including the 2016 Special Session of the UN General Assembly on the World Drug Problem and the High Level Ministerial Segment in 2019. The organization also coordinates youth participation in global campaigns such as "Support. Don't Punish" and International Overdose Awareness Day.

=== Student-specific advocacy ===
==== Drug testing ====
The organisation advocates for an end to drug testings on students, claiming that students should not have to submit to a drug test at random or to participate in extracurricular activities.

==== Peer education ====
The "Just Say Know" campaign is a peer-to-peer drug education program, provides evidence-based drug information on campus and empowers them to reduce drug-related harm within their communities.

== See also ==
- War On Drugs
- Prohibition (drugs)
- Drug policy
