= Cannabis culture =

Culture relating to cannabis

Cannabis culture describes a social atmosphere or series of associated social behaviors that depend heavily upon cannabis consumption, particularly as an entheogen, recreational drug and medicine.

Historically, cannabis has been used as an entheogen to induce spiritual experiences – most notably in the Indian subcontinent since the Vedic period dating back to approximately 1500 BCE, but perhaps as far back as 2000 BCE. Its entheogenic use was also recorded in Ancient China, the Germanic peoples, the Celts, Ancient Central Asia, and Africa. In the modern era, spiritual use of the plant is mostly associated with the Rastafari movement of Jamaica and Bob Marley who become the face of reggae and of Rastafari. Several Western subcultures have had marijuana consumption as an idiosyncratic feature, such as hippies, beatniks, hipsters (both the 1940s subculture and the contemporary subculture), ravers and hip hop.

Cannabis has now "evolved its own language, humour, etiquette, art, literature and music." Nick Brownlee writes: "Perhaps because of its ancient mystical and spiritual roots, because of the psychotherapeutic effects of the drug and because it is illegal, even the very act of smoking a joint has deep symbolism." However, the culture of cannabis as "the manifestation of introspection and bodily passivity" — which has generated a negative "slacker" stereotype around its consumers — is a relatively modern concept, as cannabis has been consumed in various forms for almost 5,000 years. Research published in the International Journal of Neuropsychopharmacology claims to have refuted the "lazy stoner stereotype." The study finds that regular cannabis users were no more likely than non-users to be apathetic or anhedonic.

The counterculture of the 1960s has been identified as the era that "sums up the glory years of modern cannabis culture", with the Woodstock Festival serving as "the pinnacle of the hippie revolution in the US, and in many people's opinion the ultimate example of cannabis culture at work". The influence of cannabis has encompassed holidays (most notably 4/20), cinema (such as the exploitation and stoner film genres), music (particularly jazz, reggae, psychedelia and rap music), and magazines including High Times and Cannabis Culture. Cannabis culture has also infiltrated other subcultures such as chess, whereby the "Bongcloud Attack" denotes a high risk opening sequence.

== Social custom ==
=== Consumption ===
Cannabis was once sold in clubs known as "Teapads" during Prohibition in the United States; jazz was usually played at these clubs. Cannabis use was often viewed to be of the lower class and was disliked by many. After the outlawing of cannabis, its consumption became covert. Decades later cannabis became once again tolerated by some regions' legislation. Customs have formed around the consumption of cannabis such as 420, named after the popular time of day to consume cannabis (4:20 p.m.) and celebrated on April 20 (4/20). If consumed in a social setting it is encouraged to share cannabis with others.

=== Use of euphemisms ===
Euphemisms have long been used by subcultures to identify parts of their culture, and this pertains especially to subcultures of things that are taboo, including cannabis. Cannabis as a product has among the highest number of direct euphemisms, with even more for related elements of cannabis culture. One of the most common cannabis euphemisms, 420, was coined in the 1970s, but other terms are centuries older. A slang scholar, Jonathon Green, noted in 2017 that even though various countries and US states were decriminalizing and legalizing cannabis, more slang terms were still being coined; he suggested that while the original need for euphemisms was because of the illegality, it had become part of the culture as those using the slang terms did not focus on the legal status of the drug, telling Time that coming up with new slang terms "is also simply fun". However, in 2021, it was suggested by researchers that new euphemisms were being coined to evade internet censors and automated moderation so that members of cannabis subcultures could discuss their use online even as common slang terms were added to banned word lists. They also suggested that, for this reason, many of the more recent euphemisms repurposed common words with innocuous meanings, as these words are less likely to be banned (it gave the example of "pot", though this is older).

The use of euphemisms and other related argot also identifies a person as belonging to a complex subculture of cannabis use both globally and regionally, with different terms in different regions. The argot also contributes to the identity of these subcultures by "provid[ing] socially constructed ways of talking, thinking, expressing, communicating and interacting among marijuana users and distributors. [...] These words convey the dynamic expressiveness involved in shared consumption and as a comprehensive communication system among subculture participants."

== In the arts ==
As the psychoactive effects of cannabis include increased appreciation of the arts, including and especially music, as well as increased creativity, its influence and usefulness can be found in a variety of works. While coded names of cannabis appeared in music as early as the 1920s, such as Louis Armstrong's song, "Muggles", it was not until the 1960s and 1970s that artists began referencing it explicitly. Songs and albums famous for their cannabis-centric lyrics produced during this time include "Got to Get You into My Life" by the Beatles, "Rainy Day Women #12 and 35" by Bob Dylan, Black Sabbath's "Sweet Leaf", and cannabis themed album "Kaya" by Bob Marley.

Today, countless artists, not constrained to any drug-culture-specific genre, have opened up about their substance consumption and how it has inspired their works. Snoop Dogg's love of marijuana is very well known, having created his own line of weed, vaporizer pen, and website focusing on cannabis culture. Willie Nelson, who owns a cannabis company called Willie's Reserve, has even said that smoking saved his life. Willie's Reserve Label is known for promoting social reform in hopes of ending marijuana and hemp prohibitions; it also partners with local Colorado growers, extractors and edibles makers for his wholesale brand. Whereas Jay-Z also represents TPCO, which is now one of the largest cannabis companies in the world, as a 'Visionary Officer'. Young artists like Greg Welch produce hundreds of pieces of art using cannabis flowers, extracts and accessories. Canadian actor and comedian Seth Rogen has a popular line of smoking accessories and home goods under the name Houseplant. Other contemporary artists who have been vocal about their cannabis use include Shawn Mendes Miley Cyrus, Jay-Z, Lady Gaga, Zayn Malik, Wiz Khalifa, Rihanna, and Dave Chappelle.

The Marley Family, to keep Bob Marley's legacy alive, started Marley Natural in 2016. Sound Tribe Sector 9, now part of Colorado's cannabis culture, partnered with Green Dot Labs to release exclusive hash pens.

In 2024, the Marley family collaborated with cannabis company Jeeter to launch a limited-edition line of cannabis products honoring Bob Marley's legacy.

== Cultures ==
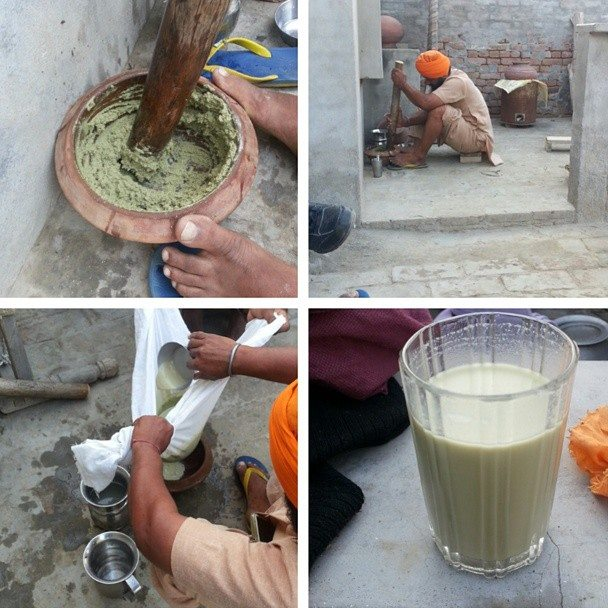
Process of making bhang in a Sikh village in Punjab, India. On the Hindu and Sikh festival of colors called Holi, it is a customary addition to some intoxicating drinks.

Cannabis — the plant that produces hemp, hashish, and marijuana — has been one of the most used psychoactive drugs in the world since the late 20th century, following only tobacco and alcohol in popularity. According to Vera Rubin, the use of cannabis has been encompassed by two major cultural complexes over time: a continuous, traditional folk stream, and a more circumscribed, contemporary configuration. The former involves both sacred and secular use, and is usually based on small-scale cultivation: the use of the plant for cordage, clothing, medicine, food, and a "general use as an euphoriant and symbol of fellowship." The second stream of expansion of cannabis use encompasses "the use of hemp for commercial manufacturers utilizing large-scale cultivation primarily as a fiber for mercantile purposes"; but it is also linked to the search for psychedelic experiences (which can be traced back to the formation of the Parisian Club des Hashischins).

Cannabis has been used in the ancient past in places such as ancient India, Romania, Egypt, and Mesopotamia. It was often used as medicine or for hemp, its main route of consumption was smoking. In addition, the plant holds cultural significance in many Eurasian countries. Hemp is associated within cultural rituals like marriage, death, birth, healing, protection, and purification. In some Eastern European folklore, hemp links a spirit to the afterlife.

Over time the culture became more international and a general "cannabis culture" formed. The culture has been responsible for the genre of films known as stoner films, which has come to be accepted as a mainstream cinema movement. In the United States the culture has also spawned its own celebrities (such as Tommy Chong and Terence McKenna), and magazines (such as Cannabis Culture and High Times). In 2018 South Korea legalized medical marijuana. Cannabis is illegal in China but is used in some medical practices and to make hemp. In Europe recreational use of cannabis is illegal, however, a National survey reports that 8% of adults have used cannabis.

=== India ===
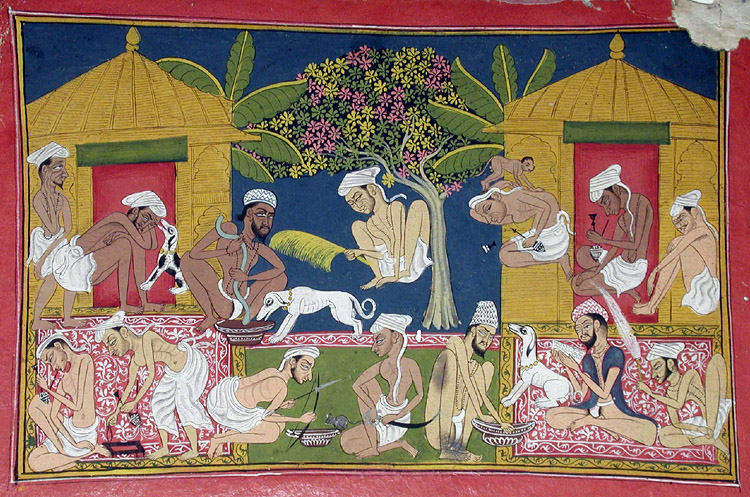
Bhang eaters from India c. 1790. Bhang is an edible preparation of cannabis native to the Indian subcontinent. It has been used in food and drink as early as 1000 BCE by Hindus in ancient India.

Cannabis is indigenous to the Indian subcontinent. Cannabis is also known to have been used by the ancient Hindus of the Indian subcontinent thousands of years ago. The herb is called ganja (Sanskrit: गञ्जा, IAST: gañjā) or ganjika in Sanskrit and other modern Indo-Aryan languages. Some scholars suggest that the ancient drug soma, mentioned in the Vedas, was cannabis, although this theory is disputed.

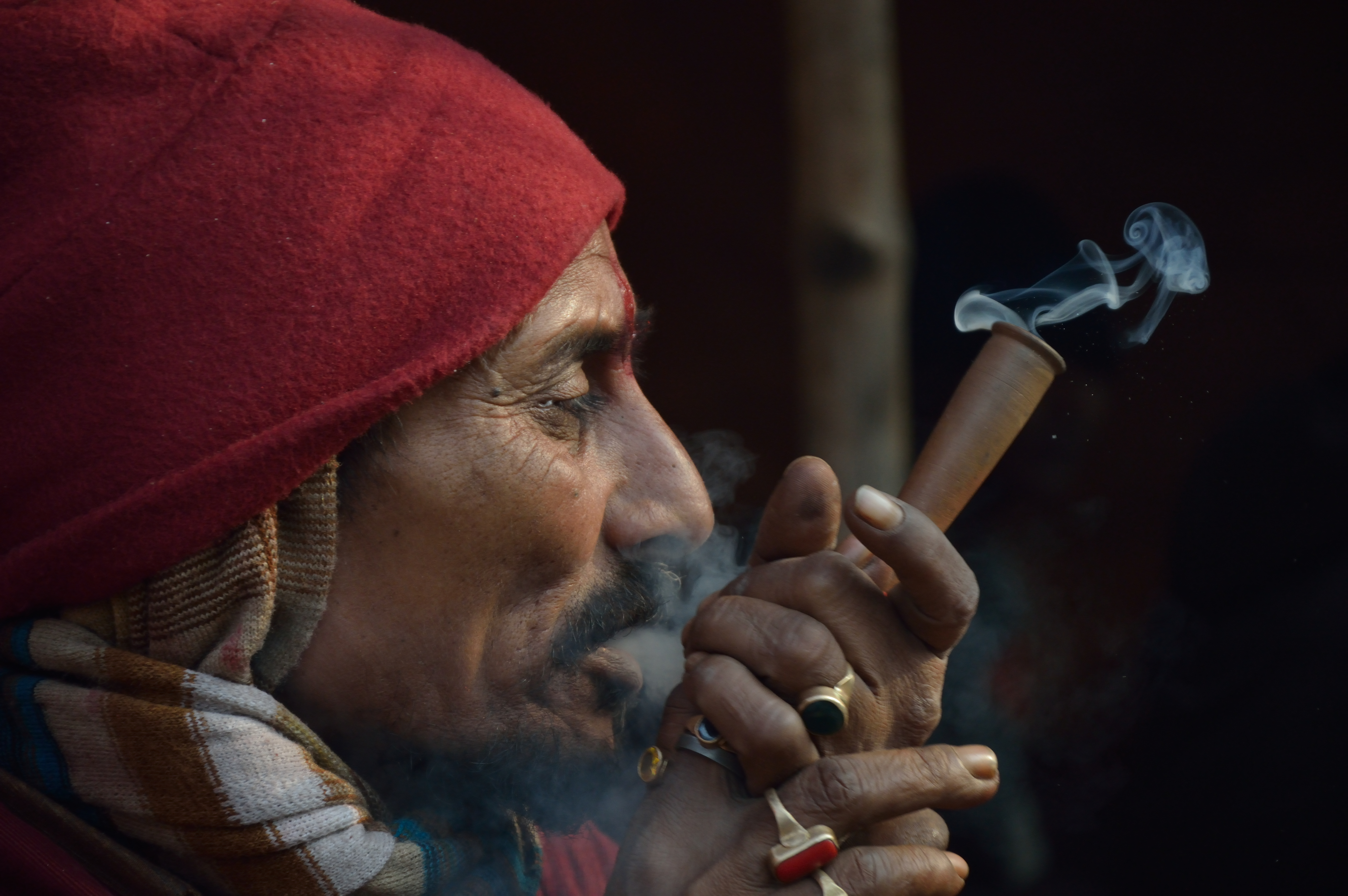
A man smoking cannabis in Kolkata, India

Today cannabis is often formed into bhang, which has become an integral part of tradition and custom in the Indian subcontinent. In some sections of rural India, people attribute various medicinal properties to the cannabis plant. If taken in proper quantity, bhang is believed to cure fever, dysentery, sunstroke, to clear phlegm, aid in digestion, appetite, cure speech imperfections and lisping, and give alertness to the body.

=== Jamaica ===
By the 8th century, cannabis had been introduced by Arab traders to Central and Southern Africa, where it is known as "dagga"; many Rastas say it is a part of their African culture that they are reclaiming. It is sometimes also referred to as "the healing of the nation", a phrase adapted from Revelation 22:2.

Alternatively, the migration of many thousands of Hindus and Muslims from British India to the Caribbean in the 20th century may have brought this culture to Jamaica. Many academics point to Indo-Caribbean origins for the ganja sacrament resulting from the importation of Indian migrant workers in a post-abolition Jamaican landscape. "Large scale use of ganja in Jamaica ... dated from the importation of indentured Indians...."(Campbell 110). Dreadlocked mystics Jata, often ascetic known as sadhus or Sufi Qalandars and Derwishes, have smoked cannabis from both chillums and coconut shell hookahs in South Asia since the ancient times. Also, the reference of "chalice" may be a transliteration of "jam-e-qalandar" (a term used by Sufi ascetics meaning 'bowl or cup of qalandar'). In South Asia, in addition to smoking, cannabis is often consumed as a drink known as bhang and most qalandars carry a large wooden pestle for that reason.

=== United States ===
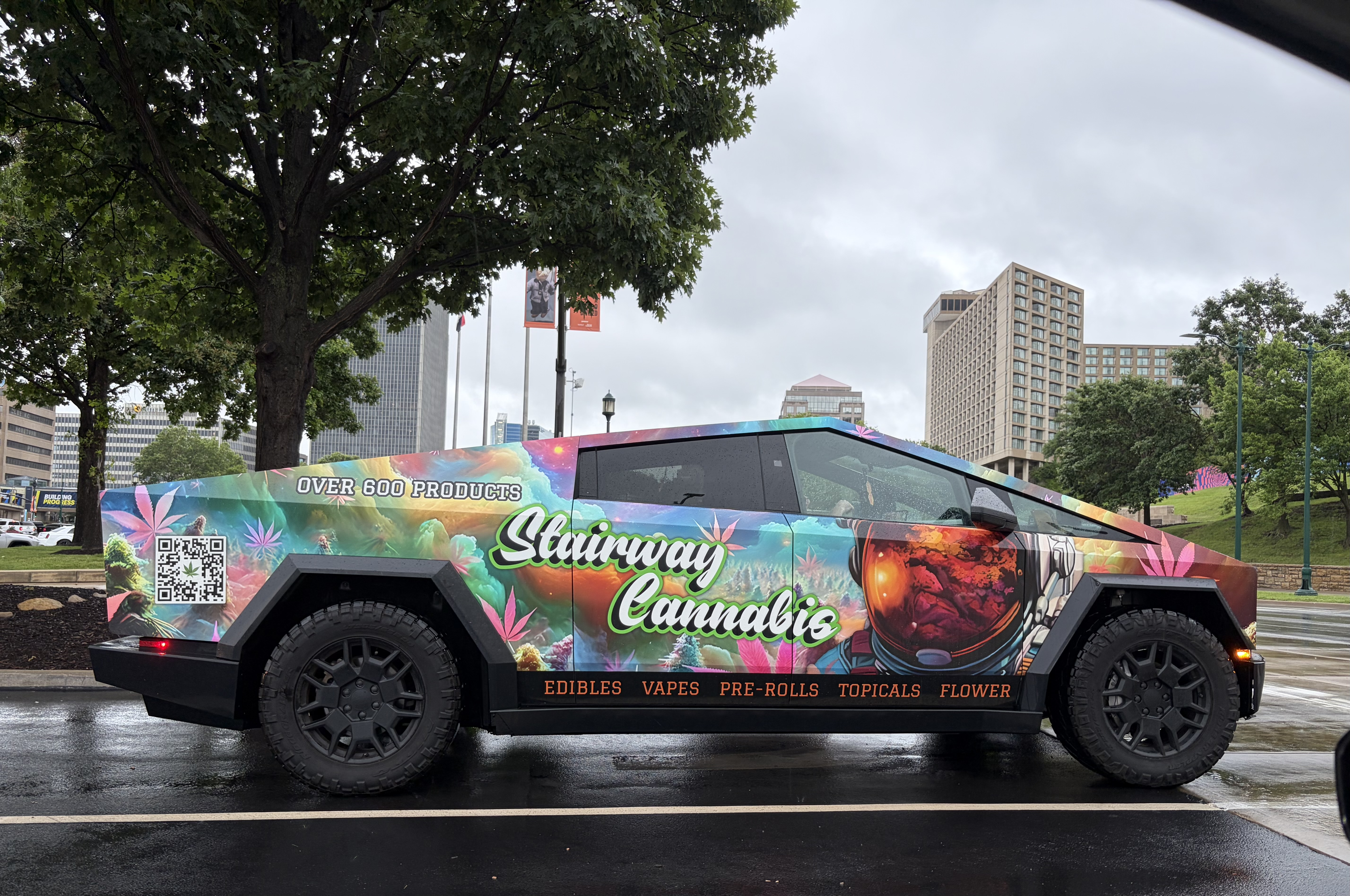
Cybertruck wrapped in cannabis company advertisement

Marijuana's history in American culture began during the Colonial Era. During this time, hemp was a critical crop, so colonial governments in Virginia and Massachusetts required land-owning farmers to grow marijuana for hemp-based products. Two of the nation's Founding Fathers, Thomas Jefferson and George Washington, were notable cultivators of hemp. Another Colonial Era figure, John Adams, was a recreational user and wrote about hemp's mind-altering powers.

==== Beatnik ====
Marijuana use was associated with the subculture, and during the 1950s, Aldous Huxley's 1954 book The Doors of Perception further influenced views on drugs. When it came to cannabis, the Beats were the first generation where it was central. Marijuana was integrated into many facets of cultural exchange and self-expression. Their assimilation of cannabis would later influence the hippie movement.

==== Hippie ====
Following in the footsteps of the Beatniks, many hippies used cannabis, considering it pleasurable and benign. Growing the plant was common practice among hippies. During the 1960s and 1970s, hippies defied many cultural and mainstream norms and having the shared substance choice of marijuana served as a sign of unity. Initially, cannabis leaves, which contain comparatively less THC than buds, were smoked by hippies.

However, attitudes towards drug use varied among hippie communes, some of which discouraging drug use, and others outright prohibiting it.

==== Hip-hop ====
The denigration of hard drug use by inner city youth played a prominent role in the entrenchment of marijuana in hip-hop culture. Blunts are a favored method of consumption. Following Cypress Hill's debut and Dr. Dre's The Chronic, the early 1990s launched cannabis from taboo to commonplace among the scene. Songs featuring lyrics about plant, pot leaf imagery and nods to smoking accessories like Zig-Zag rolling papers, shifted the perspective of pot. "I think marijuana/weed was always part of the culture, it was just underground," Sen Dog told Cuepoint.

=== Australia ===
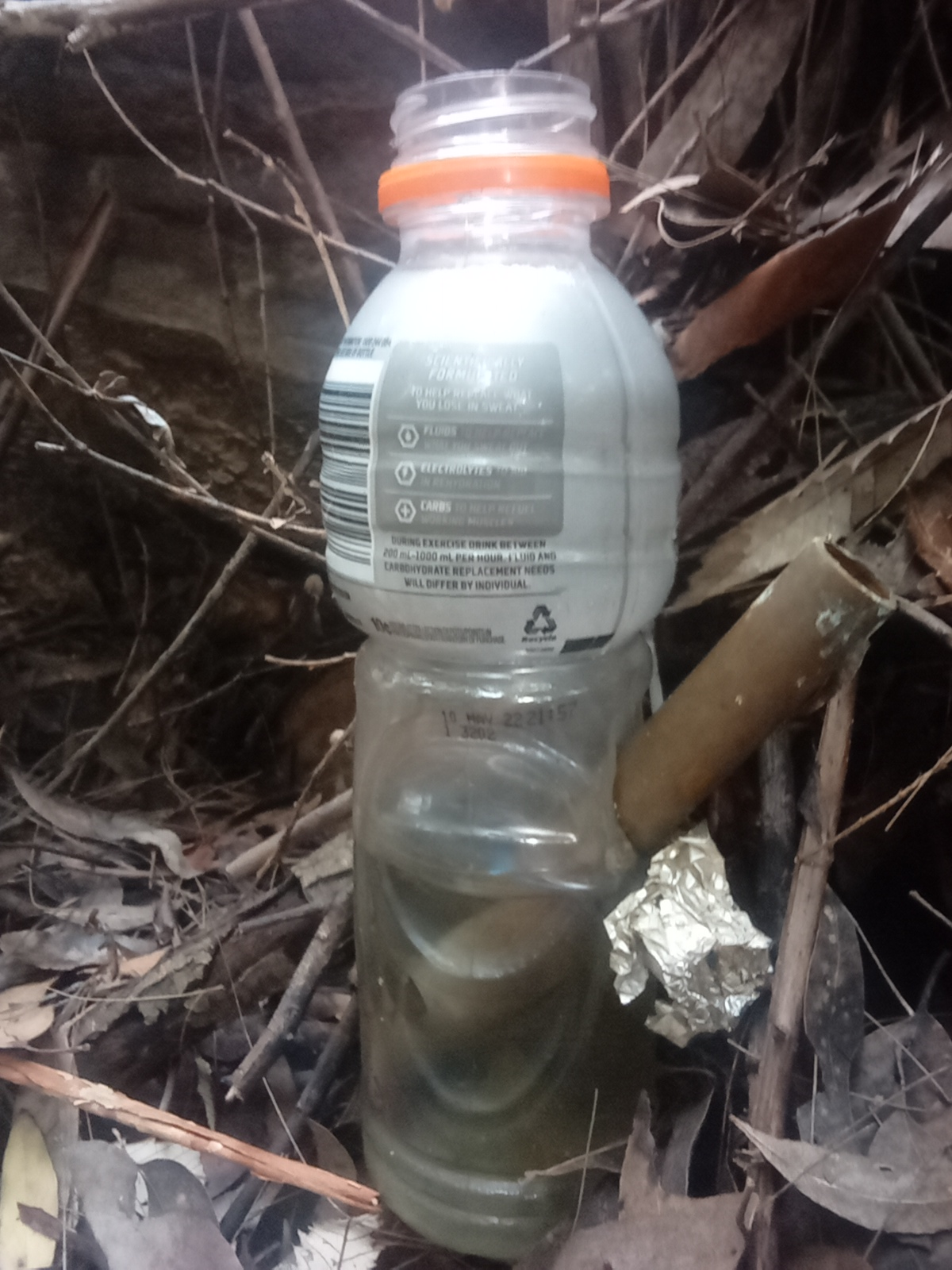

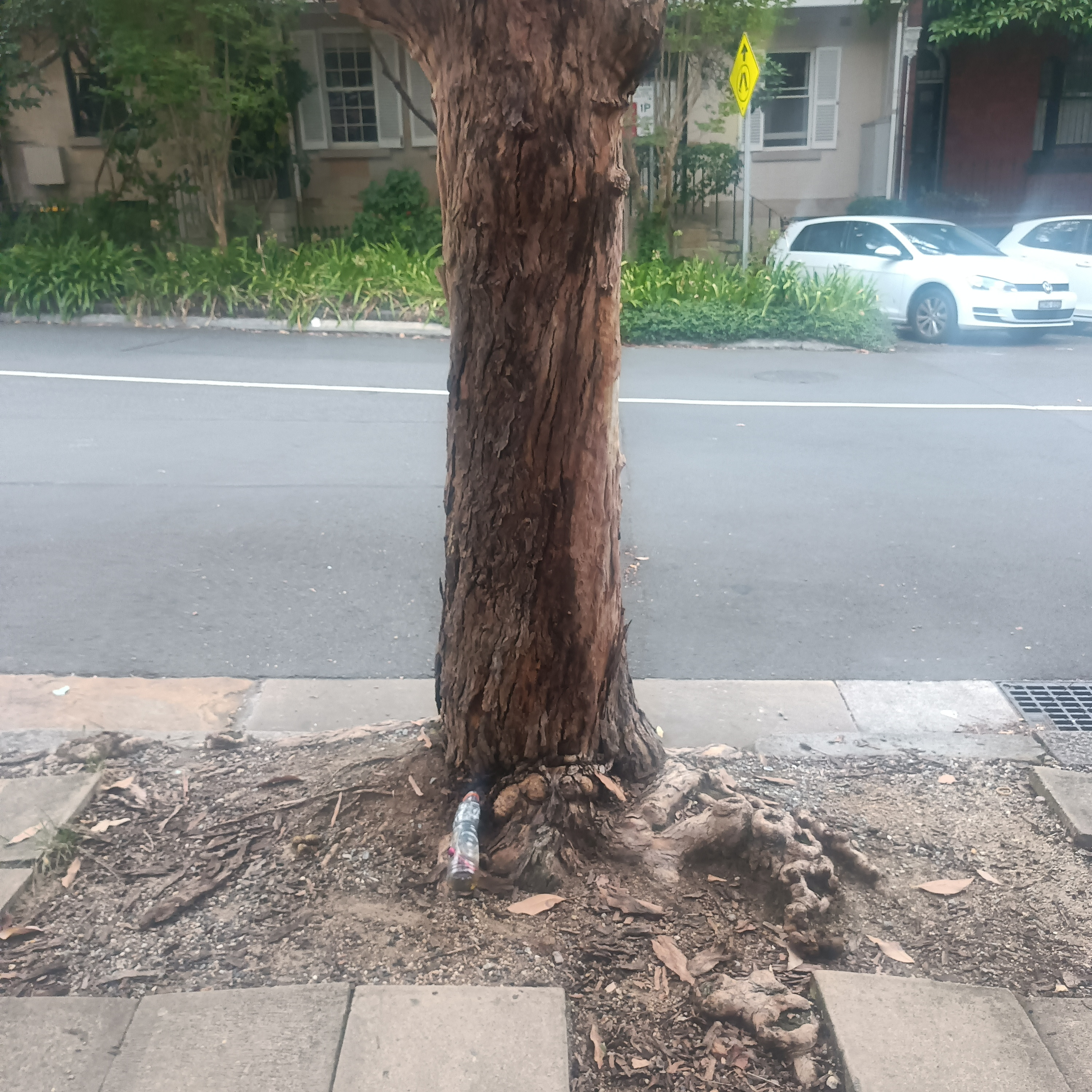
Bongs made from a Gatorade plastic drink bottle in Asquith, Top and Darlinghurst, Bottom. Sydney

Australia's harm-reduction policy allows for the legality of certain drug use as a form of medication and healing provided by public healthcare. This has led to a higher dependency on cannabis for cannabis users following what the National Library of Medicine refers to as DSM-IV.

The 2016 national drug strategy household survey showed that at least 34.8% of all Australians aged 12 years and over had used cannabis at least once in their lifetime, compared to 86.2% of Australians aged 12 years and over having consumed alcohol at least once in their lifetime.

It also found that in the 12 months prior to the survey being taken at least 10.4% of all Australians had smoked cannabis at least once.

=== Netherlands ===
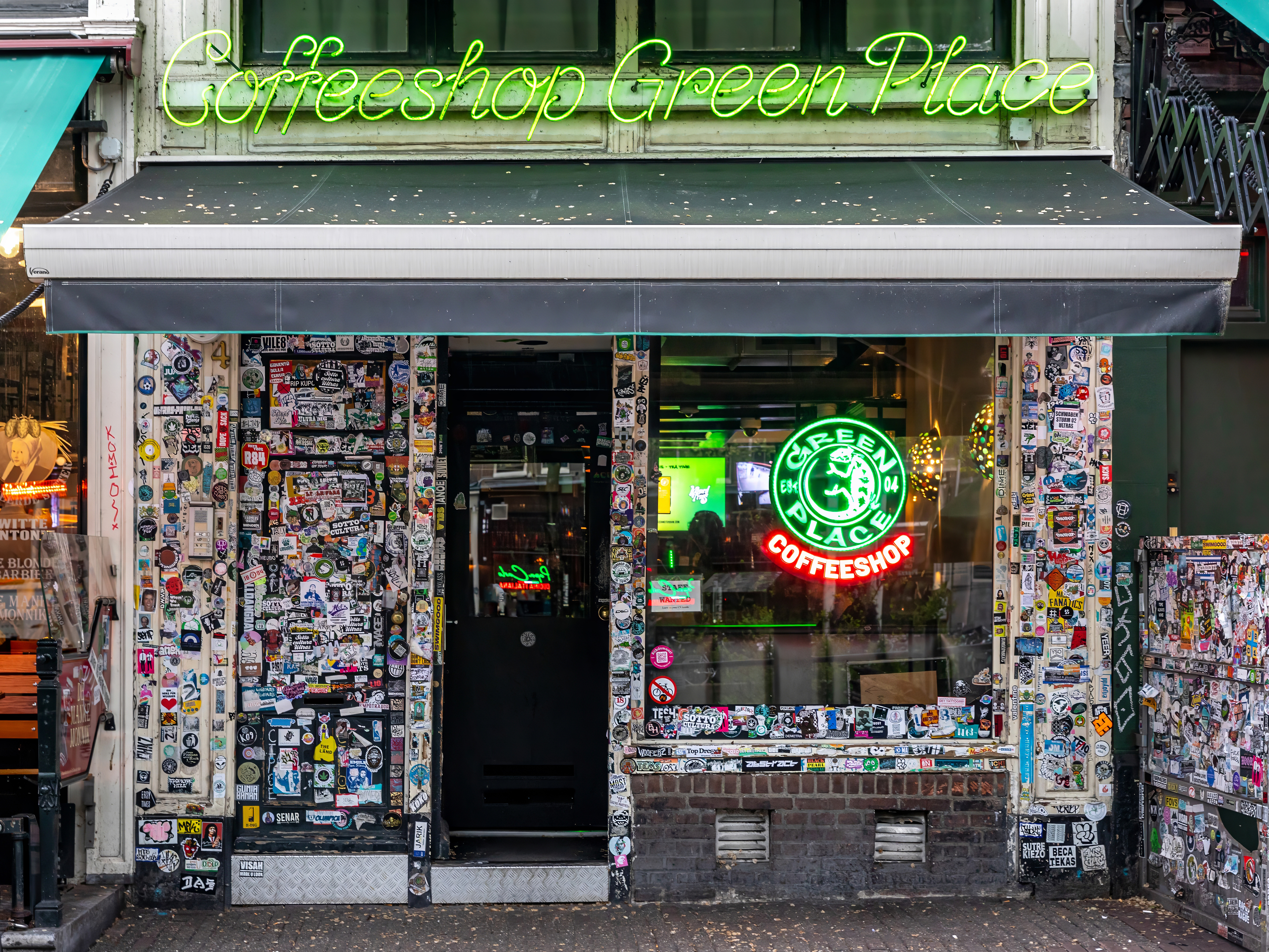
The exterior façade of the coffeeshop "Green Place" entirely covered with stickers in Amsterdam. 2024

It has been commented that "Although tourists flock to the Netherlands under the impression that cannabis is fully legal, since 1976 a tolerance policy has simply meant the sale of hash and marijuana is permitted in regulated 'coffee shops'." These regulated coffee shops sell cannabis under certain strict provisions, due to marijuana's classification as a 'soft drug' and this system of toleration is generally considered successful but some concerns arise over drug tourism as well as the way in which the cannabis is grown.

It has been commented that this system of toleration means "...the sale of cannabis is tolerated, but the cultivation of the soft drug is illegal. The result is that coffeeshops often buy their cannabis 'through the backdoor'..." as it is often referred to, and then while this sale between the coffeeshop and the grower is taking place the "...authorities look the other way...".

In 2022 a new experiment began which gave cannabis growers a three-year amnesty transition period which allowed for legal cannabis cultivation. In December 2023 a second new trial began and in this trial coffeeshops in Tilburg and Breda began the sale of regulated weed and hash. In June 2024 this then expanded to 70 coffeeshops in 10 participating municipalities who all began to sell regulated cannabis and hash. The new regulated cannabis and hash was sold in coffeeshops alongside the old unregulated products that continued to be sold.

In April 2025 a new four year trial began in 75 coffeeshops in ten participating municipalities that were from then on only allowed to purchase cannabis from the ten certified growers and would no longer sell the old unregulated products. This was then expanded in September 2025 so that hashish was also only bought from certified growers.

The mayor of Breda, Paul Depla, which is one of the municipalities participating in the trial commented “Customers haven’t walked away. Sales in the shops haven’t decreased. And we aren’t seeing any street dealing emerging either... ...Hundreds more people aren’t suddenly coming to the coffeeshop. Legalization changed something at the back door, not at the front door." Depla further went on to say "Do not wait until the end of the experiment to make a decision... ...If we want to get rid of the hypocritical tolerance policy throughout the Netherlands in four years, we must act quickly."

== Events ==
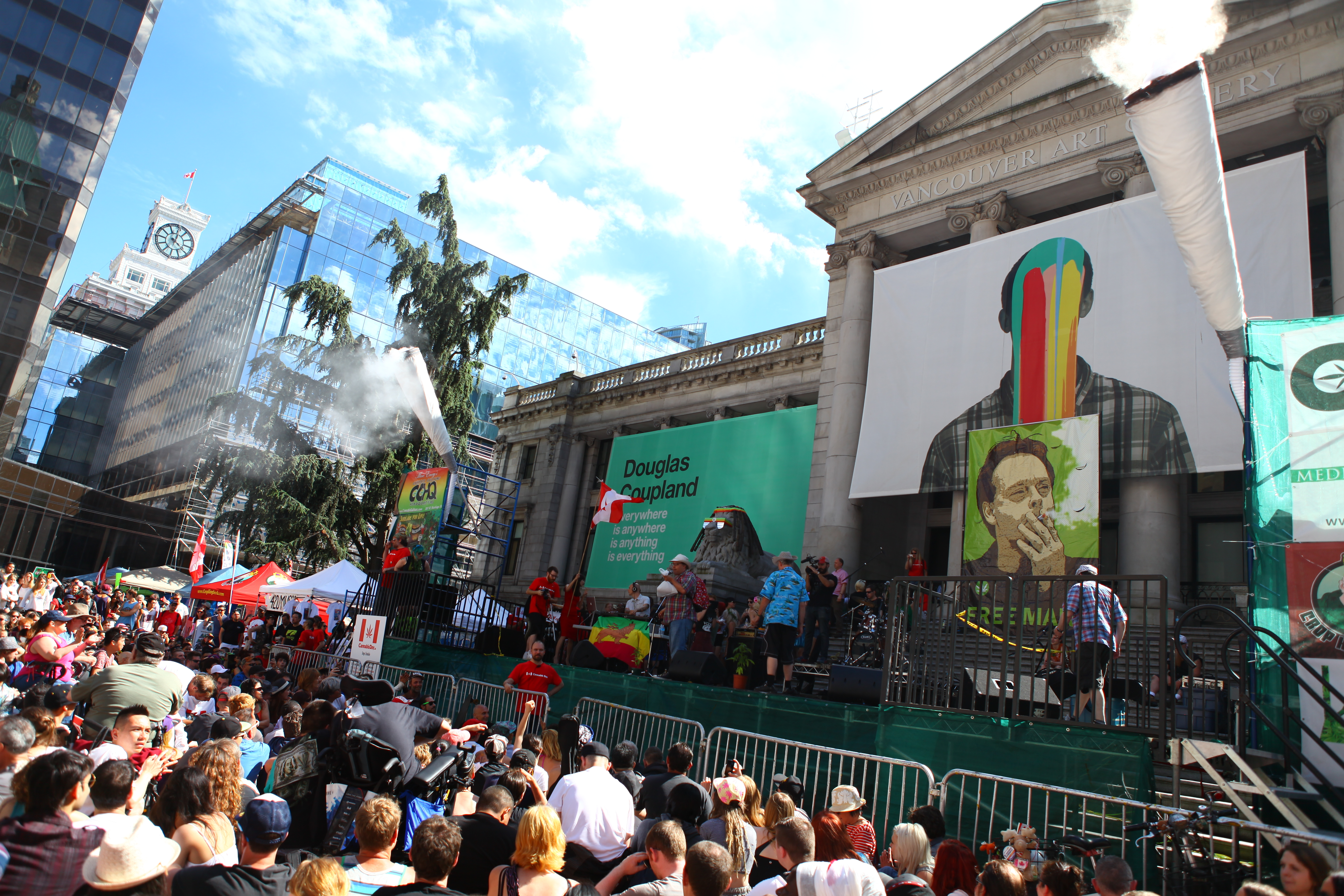
Cannabis Day event in Vancouver, British Columbia

Notable cannabis-related events have included the Cannabis Cup, Global Marijuana March, Hanfparade, High Times Medical Cannabis Cup, MardiGrass, Spannabis, and Tokers Bowl.

Annual events in the United States include the Boise Hempfest, Emerald Empire Hempfest, Freedom Rally, Great Midwest Marijuana Harvest Festival, Hash Bash, Missoula Hempfest, Moscow Hemp Fest, National Cannabis Festival, National Cannabis Summit, Olympia Hempfest, Portland Hempstalk Festival, Salem Hempfest, and Seattle Hempfest.

== Media ==
Media coverage of marijuana has progressed in recent history. Attention and coverage of the drug began in the 1930s when fabricated horror stories of its effects were used to scare the public and influence public opinion. To push the negative connotations of marijuana even more, films such as Marihuana (1936) and Reefer Madness (1937) were created.

Cannabis-related media include Cannabis Planet, High Times, Stoner TV and Weedtuber. Websites include Leafly, MassRoots, Merry Jane, Price of Weed and Wikileaf. Podcasts, another format adopted into cannabis media, include Seed to CEO, Weed + Grub and Cannabis Law Podcast.

=== Video games ===
The social game Pot Farm created "the largest cannabis community on earth", with 20 million unique players across its platforms and a 2011 figure of over 1 million users on Facebook. Wiz Khalifa's WeedFarm app (launched in 2017) was a casual mobile game where users tended to a cannabis farm and brand with the rapper's help. A number of similar tycoon style-games have been released.

=== Social media ===
"Social media posts, such as on the popular site Twitter, also reflect attitudes toward marijuana policy, with more marijuana-related communications with positive sentiment generated in states with legal recreational marijuana policies." Retailers may utilize social media platforms to advertise product, sometime through celebrity/influencer endorsement.

== See also ==
- Cannabis rights
- Coffee culture
- Drinking culture
- Entheogenic use of cannabis
- List of books about cannabis
- List of cannabis columns
- List of celebrities who own cannabis businesses
- Kava culture
- Tea culture
- Cannabis and LGBT culture
