= Hempfest =

Hempfest may refer to:

- Emerald Empire Hempfest, held annually in Eugene, Oregon, since 2003
- Great Midwest Marijuana Harvest Festival, also called Harvestfest, or Hempfest, held annually in Madison since 1971
- Missoula Hempfest, held annually since 1996
- Moscow Hemp Fest, Idaho event held annually since 1996
- Olympia Hempfest, held annually since 2004
- Salem Hempfest, held annually since 2015
- Seattle Hempfest, held annually since 1991
