= MSRT =

MSRT may refer to:

- Windows Malicious Software Removal Tool, a virus removal tool
- Maritime Security Response Team, a U.S. Coast Guard counter-terrorism unit
- Massachusetts Society of Radiologic Technicians
- Minnesota Society of Radiologic Technicians
- Ministry of Science, Research and Technology (Iran)
- MassRoots stock ticker
