= Stereotypes in consumer behaviour =

Consumer stereotyping is a process of creation of generalizations about consumption objects of members from a particular social category.

== Definition ==
This definition is based on the well-established idea that people connect ownership of certain products with membership in a certain social group. The key determinant to know more about a consumption is a self-identity, the symbolic meaning of goods and the role played by brands.

Stereotypes say about a fixed form or convention and also about something missing in individuality or originality. Human brain proceed the informations and then stores them in the memory, but there is a huge amount of informations it collects, that it is unavoidably to sort and then categorize them. Stereotypes are when people are using couple of characteristics and impressions, that they can identify and perceive a group of individual components to put into a certain main category, to understand more easily their social environment. Stereotypes provide their holders with scripts, specifying how to interact with members of specific social groups (e.g., what products to choose or avoid and how certain actions may be interpreted). Knowledge about consumer stereotypes help people with exploiting past experiences and social learning to conclude the specific characteristics and behaviors of individual group members.

Consumers often engage in shared consumption in order to become acquainted with and learn more about each other. Consumers very often are using stereotypes to help in forming their choices. The types of impressions consumers wish to create and the products they choose will be shaped by interpersonal goals, characteristics of the consumption partner, and the ability to effectively convey desired impressions.

== Examples ==
Stereotypes allow people to infer the preferences of others in a wide variety of consumption domains. Consumer research in the social identity domain has shown that it is often the case that specific products are closely tied to certain social groups. For example, Star Wars is considered masculine while Bridget Jones is considered feminine.

Accordingly, simply knowing someone’s group membership can be seen as providing a guide to his or her consumption preferences across a wide range of domains. For example, by knowing that one’s consumption partner is male, an individual may assume that he enjoys Star Wars, beer, car magazines, and sporting events. Armed with this knowledge, a consumer can convey a considerate and friendly image by tailoring his or her product choices to serve the preferences of the consumption partner.

The main goal of cross-national comparisons of purchase and consumer behaviour is to show similarities and differences between countries because results of researches in many cases just confirm already existing stereotypes. This is very useful for marketing departments in many companies, which are usually more interested in findings similar features to define marketing strategy for each country.

Also, consumers use stereotypes as a resource to help inform their choices, because stereotypes are socially shared and provide information about social groups based on easily identified qualities (e.g. race, gender), they may prove useful in inferring the preferences and anticipating the behavior of one's consumption partner.

== Classification of images of the consumer behaviour ==
The development of this category applies to both research and business areas (e.g. consumer protection), but also the importance of performing specific roles of consumer society (identification of individuals with the people that play similar roles) for the transformation of the social structure (e.g. New forms social life, such as IKEA-family).

In the literature, consumers are depicted in a number of ways. Aldridge made a classification of images of consumers, which refers to the social construction of consumers in Western discourse about their consumption behaviours. The classification includes four different images of consumers: the rational actor, communicator, victim and dupe:

- rational actor (man choosing);
- the sender of a message;
- victim (cheated when making choices);
- naive (believer that achieves their goals, targets meanwhile, pursues the objectives of others).

Another proposal for the classification of consumer identity presented by R. Sassatelli:

- unlimited ruler (sovereign),
- entrepreneur,
- snob,
- a follower (imitator),
- a slave,
- collector,
- flâneur,
- the rebel

== The impact of media in creating stereotypes ==
The media often uses and misrepresents stereotypes; however, they are significantly accepted by people among society. The most common way of showing stereotypes is through TV commercials or TV shows. If we consider TV commercials, we can easily understand that in the biggest part of commercials which are advertising domestic products main actors are women. Women are used in this type of commercials because they are considered the ones who make main decisions in purchasing domestic products. On the other hand, in commercials advertising beers or car, main actors are men. Following these examples, it can be understood that a stereotype can be made just through use of gender roles in commercials. There is also a possibility of creating stereotypes through TV shows. TV shows such as the Simpsons are packed with stereotypes within its broadcast of half an hour. The Simpsons contains a large number of audience that watch the show daily as it is broadcast during prime time. Characters such as Apu are highly discriminated and stereotyped. On this show Apu is characterized as an Indian immigrant, who prays to Ganesh, and holds a highly noticeable and dissimilar accent. This is a stereotype which is observed by young children and is perceived as humorous; they apply this knowledge towards those they meet in real-life. Viewers of this show believe this information to be completely accurate for they hold little or no knowledge about that particular group. Though the stereotypes shown on TV are usually misrepresented, they are quite well accepted by the audience as the truth. Media grabs the interests of their audience through comedy, drama, and action which causes the viewers to disregard the immorality behind the content.

== Impression management, stereotypes, and joint consumption ==
Consumers often engage in shared consumption in order to become acquainted with and learn more about each other. For example, new friends may go see a movie together to socialize or a salesperson may take a new client to dinner to learn about the client's needs. Whether the purpose is to make new friends or bring in new business, consumers often engage in joint consumption to forge new relationships with others. In these types of situations, the impressions people convey early in the relationship are important. Though new information is gained as interactions continue, additional information that contradicts the initial impression tends to be overlooked. Given the importance of creating a pleasant consumption experience in the early stages of a relationship, the products consumers choose for joint consumption are quite important and have the potential to make or break a budding relationship.

When consumers are just beginning to get to know each other, they have very little information regarding their consumption partner’s preferences and expectations for the interaction. Consumers use stereotypes as a resource to help inform their choices because stereotypes are socially shared and provide information about social groups based on easily identified qualities (e.g., race, gender), they may prove useful in inferring the preferences and anticipating the behavior of one's consumption partner.

When consumers wish to create a relationship with their consumption partners but have little information about them, they will rely on stereotypes to anticipate their consumption partner's responses. Furthermore, the types of impressions consumers wish to create and the products they choose will be shaped by interpersonal goals, characteristics of the consumption partner, and the ability to effectively convey desired impressions.

== See also ==
- National stereotypes
- Consumer behavior
- Consumer culture
- Media culture
- Gender stereotypes
- Ethnic stereotype
- Stereotype threat
