= WeedTuber =

Term for cannabis creator

A Weedtuber (a portmanteau of the words Weed and YouTube) is an online video content creator on YouTube, whose videos are focused on cannabis, often with on-camera consumption, reviews, strain education and lifestyle content like stories and cannabis culture. Since cannabis legalization of the 2010s cannabis influencers have started getting a following on socia media platforms. The term "weedtuber" began to appear on Google Trends in early 2015.

Popular Weedtubers may have 200,000 or more channel subscribers. MassRoots listed 10 channels with over 100,000 subscribers in mid 2016. Other prominent Weedtubers include Erick Khan, Goblin, RawOG420, Damianluck925 also known as Fulcrum, Cewpins, Green Mama, Strain Show, Koala Puffs, SMPLSCK, and jayblazedd. CustomGrow420 (Joel Hradecky) and Haley420 are considered pioneers in the community emerging as a major content creator’s in the mid 2010s following the legalization of cannabis with Hradecky reaching one million subscribers and Haley hitting over 700,000 in early 2017.

In 2018, YouTube deleted many cannabis related channels without explanation, several having hundreds of thousands of subscribers.

As of 2026, Dope as Yola (Thomas Araujo) is the most followed weedtuber with two million subscribers on YouTube, becoming the first weedtuber to reach the mark and making him the most popular cannabis influencer on social media. Dope as Yola also owns a podcast he hosts called DOPE AS USUAL along with Marty O'Neil discussing topics about cannabis and comedy. DrewisSharing is a British weedtuber and entrepreneur with over one million subscribers on YouTube making his the largest cannabis-related channel in the U.K. In early September 2025 he rebranded and opened a coffeeshop in Amsterdam, Netherlands, including a medical cannabis dispensary in Bangkok, Thailand, in late 2025 making him one of the most prominent in the European cannabis community.

A sponsor is reported to be willing to pay a channel with over 100,000 subscribers between $300 and $1000 for mentioning their product.

== Legality ==
Some weedtube channels were produced where cannabis was illegal but tolerated at the time, like Vancouver, British Columbia's Stephen Payne aka "Marijuana Man".

== See also ==
- Mukbang, content creators who eat for a video audience
