= Hemp in Texas =

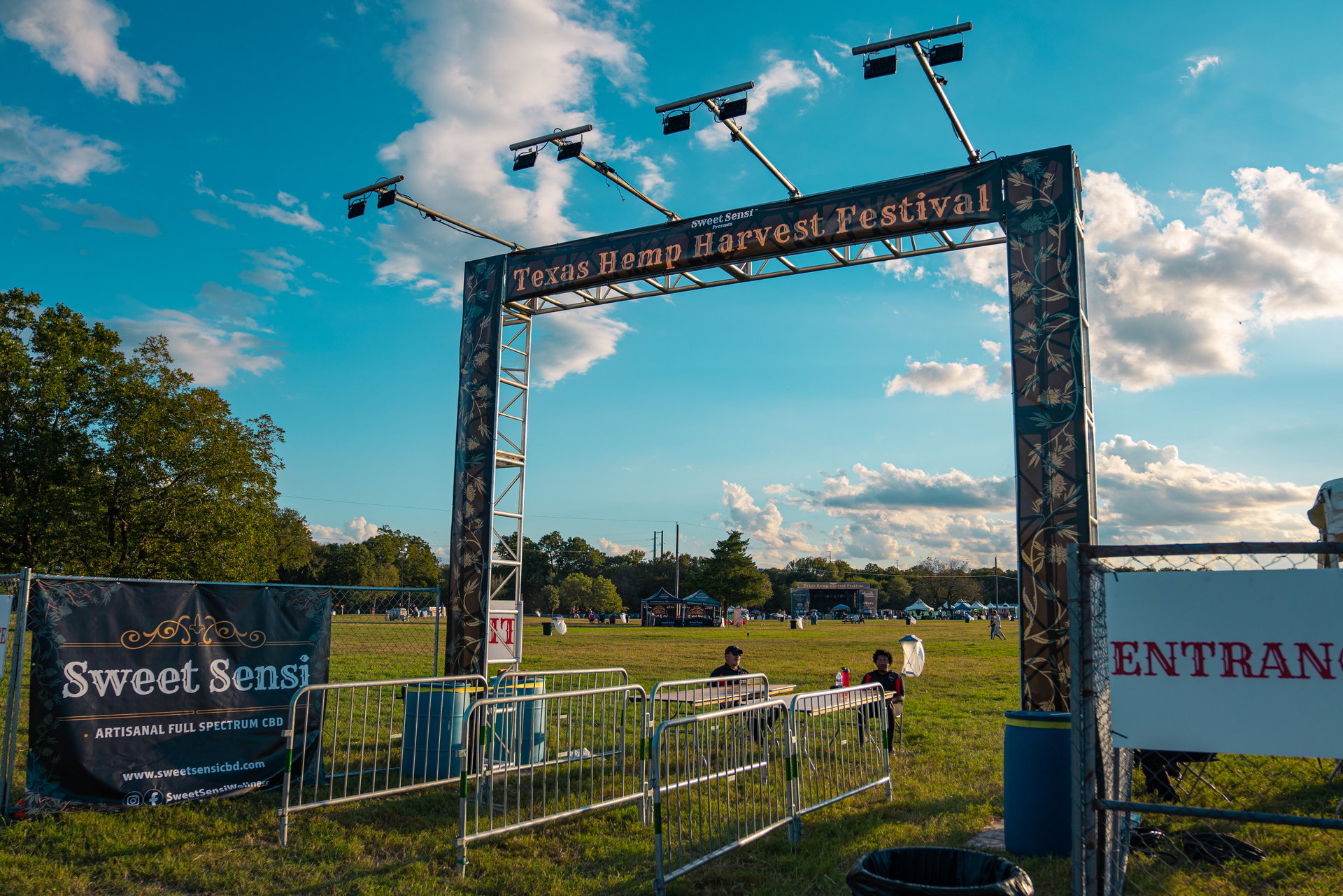
Entrance of the Texas Hemp Harvest Festival in 2021

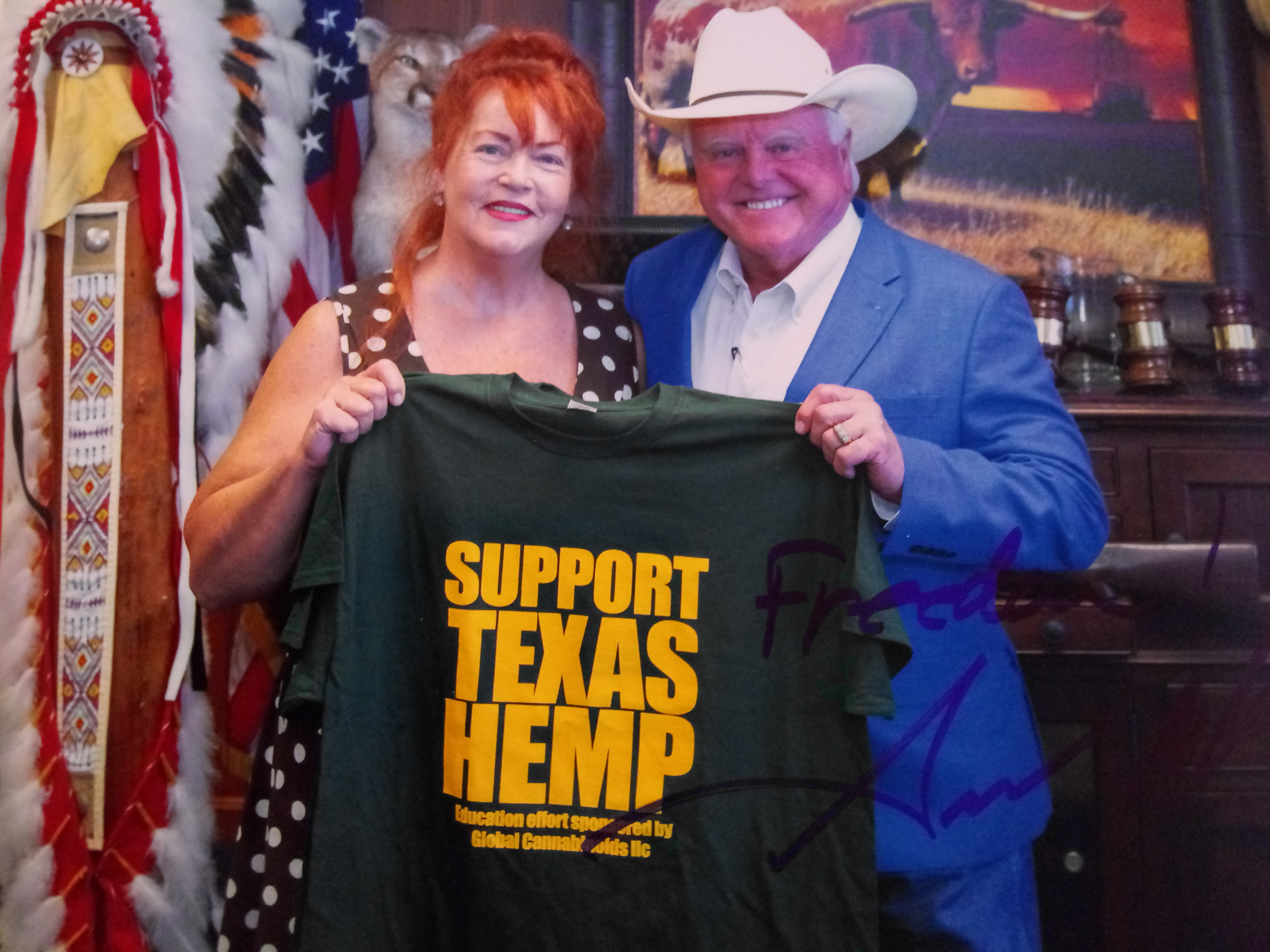
June 2019 meeting between Kathryn Mullen and Texas Agriculture Commissioner Sid Miller

Hemp was legalized in Texas in 2019 after earlier prohibition; permitting for growers began in 2020, and the first commercial harvest in 80 years was brought in the same year.

The Texas hemp market is the largest of any U.S. state. A 2025 industry report stated that the Texas hemp industry produced $5.5 billion in direct revenue and $10.3 billion in direct and indirect economic impact. The state permitted 7,253 acres (2,935 ha) of hemp in 2025. The industry employed at least 50,000 people.

Related industry groups include Texas Hemp Industries Association, Texas Hemp Business Council, and Hemp Industry Leaders of Texas. Hemp Industry Leaders of Texas sued the city of Allen, Texas in 2024 asserting that $7 million worth of legal hemp had been illegally seized. Texas Hemp Business Council was a plaintiff in a 2026 case concerning new state regulations on smokeable hemp-derived products legal under the federal 2018 Farm Bill. They won a temporary injunction in April, 2026.

Another lawsuit that claimed that state regulators has assumed a role reserved to the legislature, when they outlawed hemp high in THC-A but low in THC, resulted in an injunction in May 2026.

== See also ==
- Taste of Texas Hemp Cup
- Texas Hemp Harvest Festival
