= Cannabis and LGBTQ culture =

Cannabis symbol on pride flag

Cannabis and LGBTQ culture is the intersection of cannabis culture and LGBTQ culture. A common characteristic of advocacy for both LGBTQ rights and access to cannabis is that before about 2012, both were outside legal approval, social approval, and were on the fringe of society everywhere, and still are in much of the world. Advocacy for the two issues combined for various reasons, including claims that cannabis is an effective treatment for relieving symptoms of AIDS, the LGBTQ community having leadership in matters of social tolerance and diversity of lifestyles, and both LGBTQ and cannabis issues experiencing social grouping together as counterculture.

== By issue ==
=== Medical ===
In the timeline of HIV/AIDS at the start of the AIDS crisis in the 1980s, there were no available pharmaceutical treatments to address the disease or provide relief from the symptoms. Many people could use medical cannabis to get relief that they could not get in any other way. However, at that time, cannabis was illegal in many places. Because LGBTQ people were disproportionately affected by HIV/AIDS, the LGBTQ community had a new and urgent need for access to cannabis. Activism for LGBTQ rights began to overlap with activism for access to cannabis. This LGBTQ activism for cannabis is sometimes organized as clubs or social networks through which people with cannabis would distribute it to people with AIDS. In 1990, a news report claimed that many people with HIV use cannabis for palliative care.

LGBTQ and HIV activism greatly increased public support for access to cannabis.

Harvey Milk and Dennis Peron were San Francisco-based LGBTQ political figures who proposed legislation for legalizing cannabis to benefit the LGBTQ community and others.

=== Marketplace ===
There is evidence that suggests that the business sector that invests in cannabis production and sales has a lower percentage of LGBTQ representation than the consumer market for cannabis products.

There are also success stories of LGBTQ people in the cannabis industry and advocacy organizations like Proud Mary Network and The Full Spectrum.

Analysis recommends marketing cannabis to LGBTQ communities.

== In the United States ==
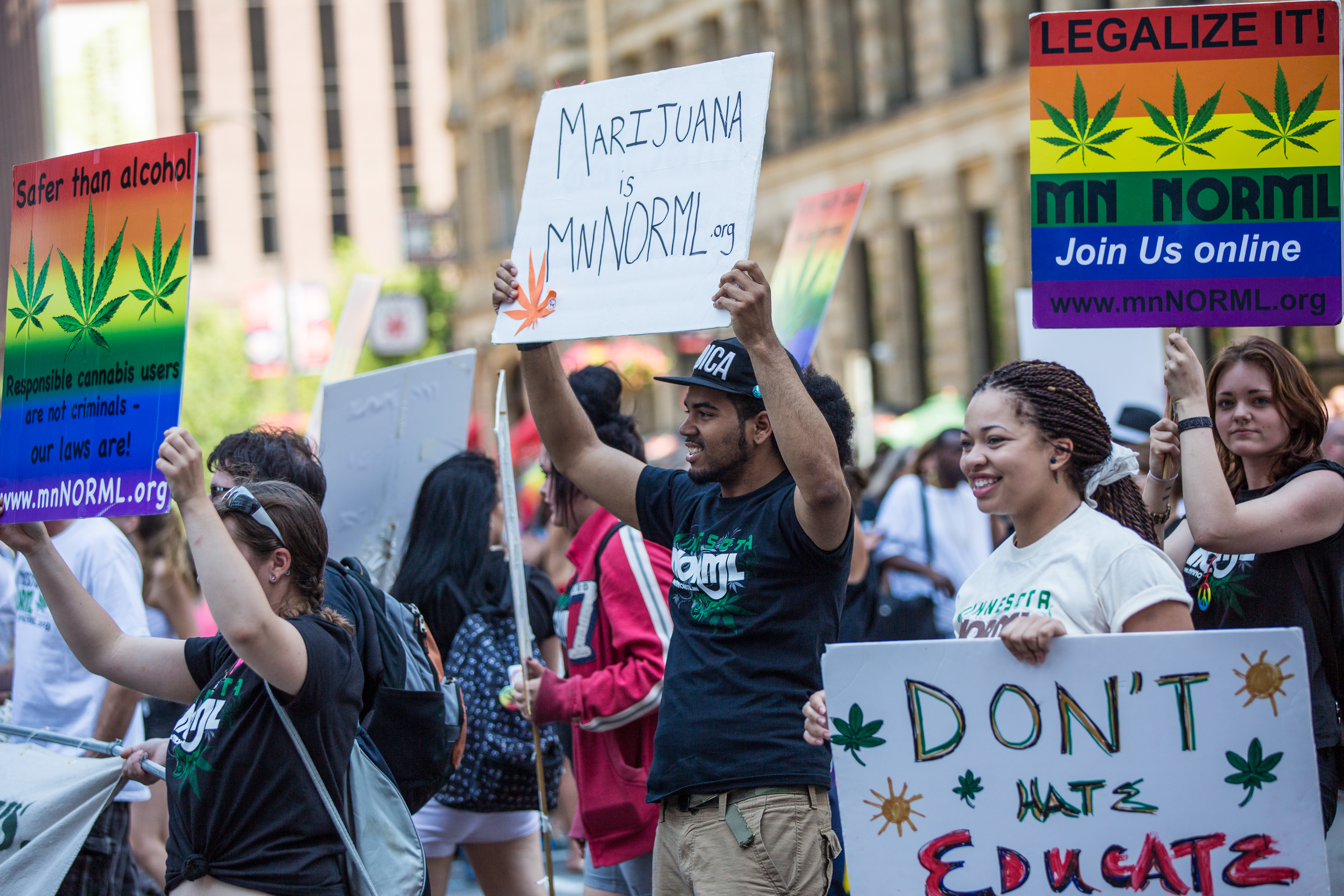
People calling for the legalization of cannabis at the Twin Cities Pride Parade in Minneapolis, Minnesota in 2013

Political commentators in the United States have compared the rapid changing of public opinion in the 2000s-10s on the issues of LGBTQ rights and access to cannabis. Whereas before, around late 2012, both subjects were taboo in the mainstream, after that time, there has been a growing trend to normalize social acceptance of both LGBTQ people and cannabis use. Many media outlets compared the similarities between LGBTQ and cannabis advocacy.

In the years leading up to the changes, many reputed authorities incorrectly assessed public support for both LGBTQ and cannabis to be lower than it was. Federal laws in the United States were more misaligned than state laws on these subjects.
