= Marital surplus =

Economic concept regarding the net gain from marriage

In economics, the marital surplus refers to the total net gain in utility or well-being that individuals achieve by forming and maintaining a long-term partnership (including legal marriage or cohabitation) compared to the utility they would receive if they remained single. According to the economic theory of marriage, this expected surplus is the incentive that drives the decision to enter a partnership; the dissipation of the surplus can lead to divorce or dissolution.

The marital surplus includes both economic benefits, arising from specialization and economies of scale, and non-economic benefits, such as companionship, intimacy, and the utility derived from raising children. Economists utilize frameworks such as transferable utility models and bargaining theory to analyze how the surplus is generated, how it is divided between spouses, and how it influences marital stability. Research indicates that the primary sources of marital surplus have shifted over time from household production toward joint consumption, and that the surplus is often divided unequally between partners.

== Definition and components ==
The marital surplus encompasses all utility-enhancing effects generated by a relationship that would not exist if the individuals remained separate. Economic models often assume individuals are rational utility maximizers who enter marriage only if it is a "positive-sum" arrangement—meaning they expect to be better off married than in their best alternative situation.

The surplus is generated through the inputs of the spouses, including tangible resources like income and assets, and intangible contributions such as labor (both market and domestic), human capital, and emotional support. The resulting gains include:

- Economic benefits: Risk pooling, economies of scale in living expenses, and increased household output through specialization.
- Non-economic benefits: Companionship, sexual intimacy, mutual aid, and the utility derived from having and raising children.

Many components of the marital surplus are characterized as household public goods, subject of the joint consumption. This characteristic means that the actions required to maximize the joint surplus may sometimes conflict with the immediate self-interest of the individual spouse responsible for performing them. Generating the surplus therefore relies on cooperation and the deterrence of "shirking" marital obligations.

Some models distinguish the marital surplus from the total "marital pool." The pool includes all resources brought into the marriage, some of which might exist regardless of the union (like individual income). The surplus, however, is specifically the enhanced value created by the partnership itself, such as the utility gained from sharing the other's income or specialized services.

== Sources of the surplus ==
Economists distinguish between two primary mechanisms that generate marital surplus: production complementarities and consumption complementarities. The relative importance of these sources influences patterns of assortative mating.

=== Production complementarities ===
Production-based gains arise from joint production within the household, specifically through specialization and exchange, as theorized by Gary Becker. This model suggests that the surplus is maximized when individuals with different capabilities partner, allowing them to specialize in distinct activities (e.g., market work versus domestic production). This framework implies negative assortative mating based on complementary skills, such as a high-wage earner marrying an efficient homemaker.

=== Consumption complementarities ===
Consumption-based gains arise from the joint consumption of household public goods (such as children or shared leisure), risk pooling, and the direct utility of time spent together. This model suggests that the surplus is maximized when individuals with similar preferences for consumption and leisure partner. This framework implies positive assortative mating based on shared interests and tastes.

=== Historical shift ===
Research suggests a historical shift in the primary source of marital surplus in industrialized societies. As women's labor force participation has increased and the relative significance of household production has declined, the gains from specialization have diminished. Consequently, consumption complementarities have become the increasingly dominant source of marital surplus.

Economist Shelly Lundberg tested this hypothesis using personality traits as indicators of preferences and capabilities in German panel data. She found that for older cohorts (born 1945–1959), selection into marriage differed significantly by gender, consistent with specialized production. For younger cohorts (born in the 1960s and later), the effects of personality on marriage probabilities were similar for men and women, consistent with a consumption-based surplus driven by shared preferences.

== Theoretical frameworks ==
=== Transferable utility models ===
Many economic analyses of the marriage market utilize two-sided matching models with Transferable Utility (TU), notably the framework developed by Choo and Siow (2006). In these models, it is assumed that the total joint surplus generated by a couple can be seamlessly divided between the spouses.

In TU models, the marital surplus is composed of a systematic component (based on observable characteristics like education) and an idiosyncratic component (based on individual tastes or match quality). A key implication of the TU assumption is that the decision to divorce depends only on the magnitude of the total marital surplus, not on how that surplus is divided, as partners can theoretically reallocate utility to maintain the relationship as long as the total surplus is positive.

=== Bargaining models ===
The division of the marital surplus is modeled as a continuous bargaining process. Legal scholar Amy L. Wax models marriage as a bilateral monopoly, where spouses negotiate the allocation of benefits and burdens in an exclusive relationship without recourse to market pricing. This is often conceptualized as a "split-the-pie" game, where failure to agree results in a loss of potential surplus (through divorce or discord), incentivizing cooperation.

=== Strategic interaction ===
The generation and maintenance of the marital surplus involve strategic interactions throughout the relationship lifecycle.

During the courtship stage, individuals engage in signaling to demonstrate their suitability. A key trait signaled is trustworthiness (often described as having a low discount rate), indicating a willingness to incur the short-term costs necessary to produce the long-term marital surplus. Signals include exclusive attention, gift-giving, and the marriage vow.

During the relationship stage, cooperation is required to create the surplus. This is often modeled as a repeated prisoner's dilemma. Spouses must deter each other from shirking marital obligations. This may involve strategies like tit-for-tat, where one spouse retaliates against perceived cheating by the other to enforce cooperation. Cooperation can be complicated by information problems and moral hazard, where a spouse might shirk responsibilities because their effort cannot be perfectly monitored.

== Allocation and bargaining power ==
=== Threat points ===
The allocation depends on the bargaining power of each spouse, which is determined by their respective "threat points" or fallback alternatives. The threat point represents the outcome if the spouses fail to reach an agreement. This determines each spouse's "reservation price"—the minimum share they are willing to accept. The surplus remaining after both reservation prices are met is the "bargaining surplus," which is the focus of negotiation.

Key threat points include:

- Divorce (Exit Options): The utility an individual could achieve outside the marriage, influenced by their earning potential, assets, and prospects in the remarriage market.
- Intramarital Discord: Remaining married but failing to coordinate efforts (the "harsh words and burnt toast" alternative). This is less efficient than cooperation but may be preferable to divorce.

=== Gender differences and inequality ===
While marriage generates a surplus, research suggests it is often divided unequally. Bargaining theory suggests this favors the partner with the higher threat point. Wax argues that men generally possess greater bargaining power because they typically have better options in the labor market and the remarriage market (as women's prospects tend to decline more rapidly with age). Furthermore, women often make greater "marriage-specific investments" (e.g., domestic specialization) that decrease their market value post-divorce, while men invest in portable market capital. The "work-leisure gap," where wives in dual-earner couples often work significantly more total hours (paid and domestic combined) than their husbands, is cited as evidence of unequal allocation of the surplus.

Empirical studies have found asymmetries in the division. Bruze, Svarer, and Weiss (2015) found that education significantly raises the share of the surplus for men, but less so for women. Furthermore, as couples get older, husbands tend to receive a progressively larger share of the marital surplus.

== Empirical estimation and findings ==
=== Estimation and identification ===
In structural economic models, the marital surplus is typically not observed directly but is inferred from observed marriage patterns (who marries whom and who remains single). The estimation process identifies the surplus values that rationalize the choices observed in the marriage market.

One identification strategy relies on the behavior of couples and singles. In models with transferable utility, the total marital surplus can be identified from the probability of divorce; based on the work of Becker, Landes, and Michael (1977), higher surplus implies lower divorce rates. The shares of the surplus received by each spouse can be identified by their willingness to enter marriage, as higher expected shares increase entry rates.

=== Findings and validation ===
Education is a significant factor influencing the marital surplus. Research indicates that the educations of husbands and wives are complements (exhibiting supermodularity); the surplus is maximized when partners have similar levels of education, which explains positive educational assortative mating. When both spouses have the same education level, the total marital surplus generally increases with education.

Research has validated that structurally estimated measures of marital surplus correlate with real-world outcomes. Doorley, Dupuy, and Weber (2018) found that a higher estimated marital surplus is significantly associated with a lower probability of separation and a more equal level of subjective life satisfaction between spouses.

In analyzing economic inequality, Dupuy and Weber (2018) found that marital patterns explained about one-third of the rise in U.S. income inequality between 1962 and 2017. They concluded this effect was overwhelmingly driven by the extensive margin (who remains single) rather than the intensive margin (changes in assortative mating).

== Sources ==
- Becker, Gary S. (1974). "A Theory of Marriage" (PDF). In Schultz, Theodore W. (ed.). Economics of the Family: Marriage, Children, and Human Capital. University of Chicago Press. pp. 299–351. ISBN 0-226-74085-4 – via National Bureau of Economic Research.
- Bruze, Gustaf; Svarer, Michael; Weiss, Yoram (2015). "The Dynamics of Marriage and Divorce". Journal of Labor Economics. 33 (1): 123–170. doi:10.1086/677393. JSTOR 10.1086/677393.
- Doorley, Karina; Dupuy, Arnaud; Weber, Simon (2018). "The Empirical Content of Marital Surplus in Matching Models" (PDF). IZA Discussion Paper Series. 11823.
- Dupuy, Arnaud; Weber, Simon (2018). "Marital Patterns and Income Inequality" (PDF). IZA Discussion Paper Series. 11572.
- Lundberg, Shelly (2012). "Personality and marital surplus". IZA Journal of Labor Economics. 1 (3) 3: 1–21. doi:10.1186/2193-8997-1-3. hdl:10419/92275.
- Posner, Eric A. (2009). "Family Law and Social Norms". Law and Social Norms. Harvard University Press. pp. 69–72. ISBN 978-0-674-00156-5.
- Wax, Amy L. (1998). "Bargaining in the Shadow of the Market: Is There a Future for Egalitarian Marriage?". Virginia Law Review. 84 (4): 509–672. doi:10.2307/1073760. JSTOR 1073760.
