= Texas Hemp Harvest Festival =

Annual music festival

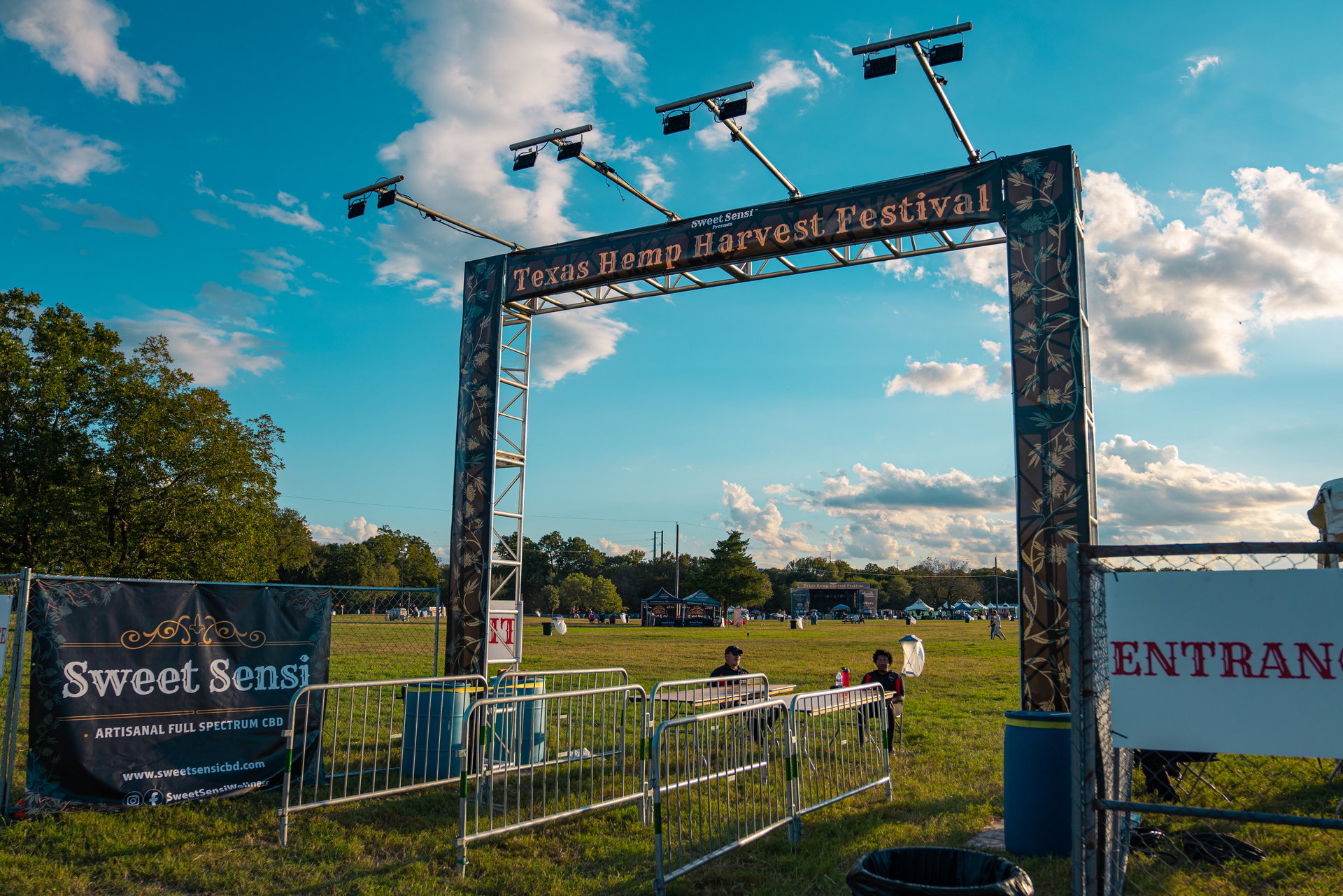
- Genre: Hemp, Reggae, Country, Bluegrass
- Dates: November 3–4, 2023
- Locations: Austin, Texas, United States
- Years active: 2021–present
- Founders: Sweet Sensi
- Website: www.texashempharvestfestival.com

The Texas Hemp Harvest Festival is an annual music festival held in Austin, Texas.

Texas Hemp Harvest Festival was the first mass gathering approved by Travis County since the outbreak of the COVID-19 pandemic in Texas in October 2021, even before the Austin City Limits Music Festival.

== History ==
The idea for the Texas Hemp Harvest Festival was born out of Greg and Sweet Sensi's experiences attending other small hemp events as vendors and competitors in hemp product competitions.

The first Texas Hemp Harvest Festival took place in October 2021 at the Carson Creek Ranch in Austin, covering over 40 acres and accommodating 5,000 attendees. The festival featured two stages, one large stage on the main lawn area for headlining acts, and a smaller stage set on the river bank auditorium area with a view of the river behind it. Sweet Sensi hired Angela Tharp, owner of Flamingo Cantina to produce the event. Tharp booked reggae and country musicians for the event, including Ky-Mani Marley, and country singer Gary P. Nunn. Local bands and speakers from the hemp industry were also featured on the stages.

Austin food trucks were contracted to provide a variety of options, such as pizza from Stoney's Pizza and Caribbean food from Winston's Kitchen. The festival also hosted the "Battle of the Buds," a competition for hemp flower, edibles, and topicals, where consumers had the chance to sample and vote for their favorite products.

In its first year, the Texas Hemp Harvest Festival attracted 2,500 attendees. In the second year, having moved to a smaller venue at Distribution Hall, the number slightly decreased to 2,000 attendees.

== Additional events ==
Sweet Sensi also hosted a Hemp Planting Festival in Austin during March 2023, coinciding with the SXSW events. This festival is an extension of the Harvest Festival and celebrates the planting of hemp for the next harvest. The Planting Festival featured live music, vendors, and speakers advocating for hemp through legislative processes.

== Artists lineup by year ==
2021:

Headlining performance by Ky-Mani Marley. Other artists lineup included Gary P. Nunn, Cas Haley, The Mau Mau Chaplains, The Supervillians, Big Mon, Bo Porter, Armadillo Road, Soulfiya with Wi’deya, Pure Luck, Doug Moreland, The Derailers.

2022:

Headline performance by Collie Buddz, additional artists included Sister Nancy, The Mau Mau Chaplains, Soulfiya with Wi’deya, DJ Tropicana Joe.

2023:

Headliners this year are 10 ft Ganja Plant, Josh Heinrichs & SkillinJah. Additional performers include DJ Tropicana Joe, DJ Jah Karma, The Mau Mau Chaplains, Sister Nancy (With Lion Heights) & Passafire.

== See also ==
- Hemp in Texas
