= List of cannabis competitions =

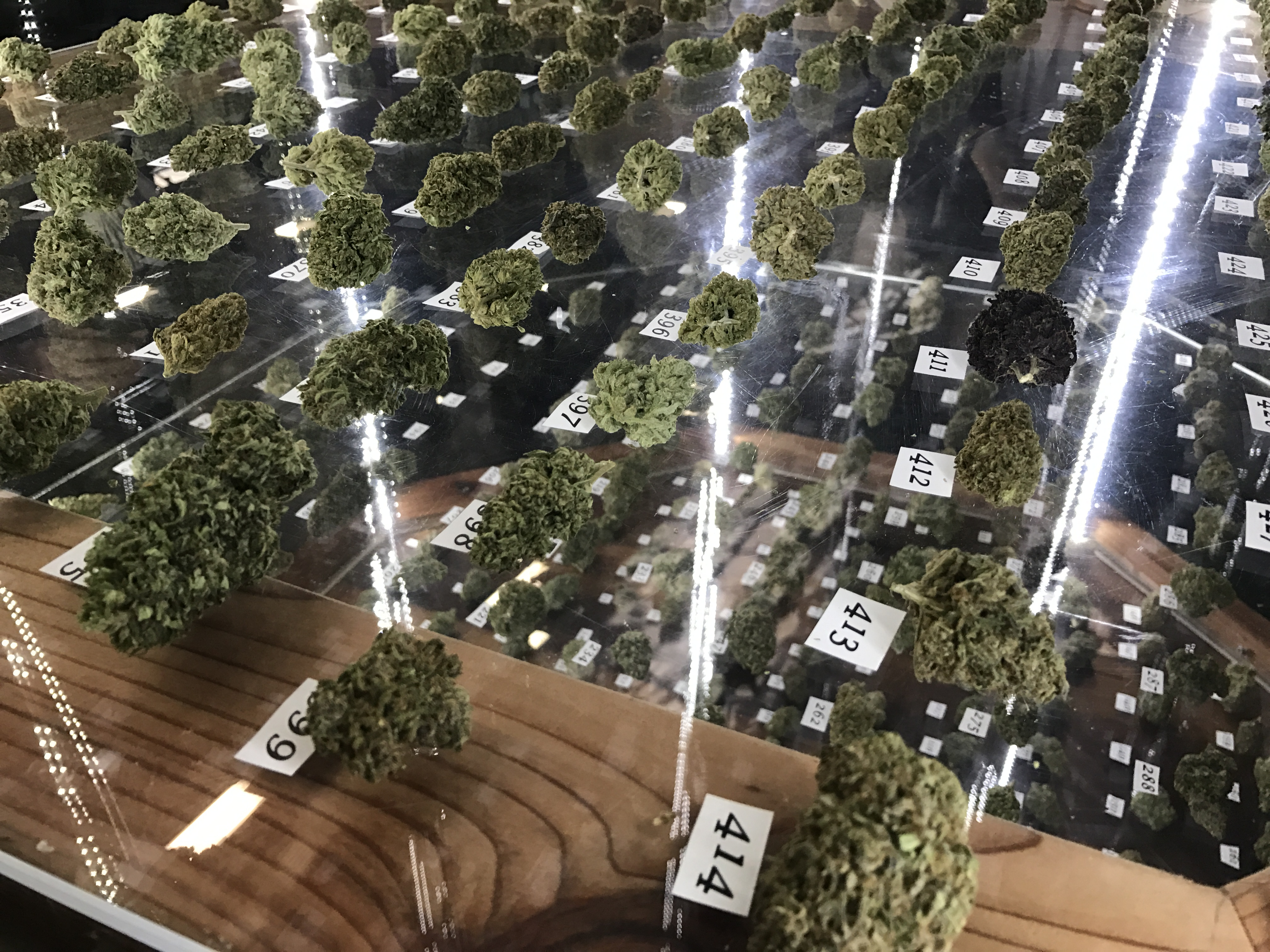
Cannabis flower to be judged

This list of cannabis competitions is an index to articles about notable competitions related to cannabis. Many are part of a larger cannabis festival and two are part of a state fair.

== Australia and New Zealand ==
- Australian Cannabis Awards
- Nimbin Mardigrass
- Australian Cannabis Cup

== Australian Cannabis Cup ==
The Australian Cannabis Cup is an annual cannabis competition held in Nimbin, New South Wales, Australia. It has been celebrated since before 1995 and is known for recognizing excellence in cannabis produce.

The event features judges from around Australia who sample and vote for their favourite cannabis varieties, with cups (trophies) being awarded to the overall winner in the cannabis variety competition and in the best wax, dabs and rosin categories.

=== History ===
The Australian Cannabis Cup gained national attention in 1995 when it was featured in a documentary by 60 Minutes. Over the years, the event has evolved, with a focus on two primary categories: buds/flowers and extracts like oils and hash. In recent years, Alec ‘Craze’ Zammitt and Will Stolk, members of the 420 cannabis protest group 'Who Are We Hurting?,' have documented the event through video coverage.

=== Categories ===
Award categories include Best Flower, Wax or Dab, Best Hash, (hashish that is produced only in Australia). A team of judges decides which grower has grown the Best Indica, Best Sativa, and Best Hash.

The U.S. Cannabis Cup recognizes marijuana in states that have passed laws that legalize marijuana for adult, recreational use. Teams of expert judges vote on Best Indica, Best Sativa, Best Hybrid,

While in Australia the illegality of Cannabis has made the Cannabis Cup more of an underground hush, hush affair for members of the tight knit cannabis community.

=== Impact ===
This event has played a significant role in showcasing and pushing for change within the cannabis community in Australia and raising awareness about medicinal cannabis, which began being prescribed en masse to the public in 2018.

The Australian Cannabis Cup brings together local and international cannabis enthusiasts. The celebration also helps continue the area's tradition of counter-cultural norms.

=== Legal considerations ===
The event operates in a legal landscape where recreational cannabis remains illegal at the federal level in Australia. Nevertheless, changing attitudes toward cannabis legislation and the growing medicinal cannabis industry have influenced the event's reception and its role in the broader discourse on cannabis in Australia.

== Jamaica ==
- The annual Jamaican Cannabis Festival (Montego Bay, 2014–). Best/strongest strains awarded as well as an introduction to new developments.

== Canada ==
- Prairie Harvest Medicinal Marijuana Cup (Saskatoon, 2011–)
- Tokers Bowl (Vancouver 2002–2005)
- Toronto Cannabis Cup
- Winnipeg Cannabis Cup (2016–)

== United States ==
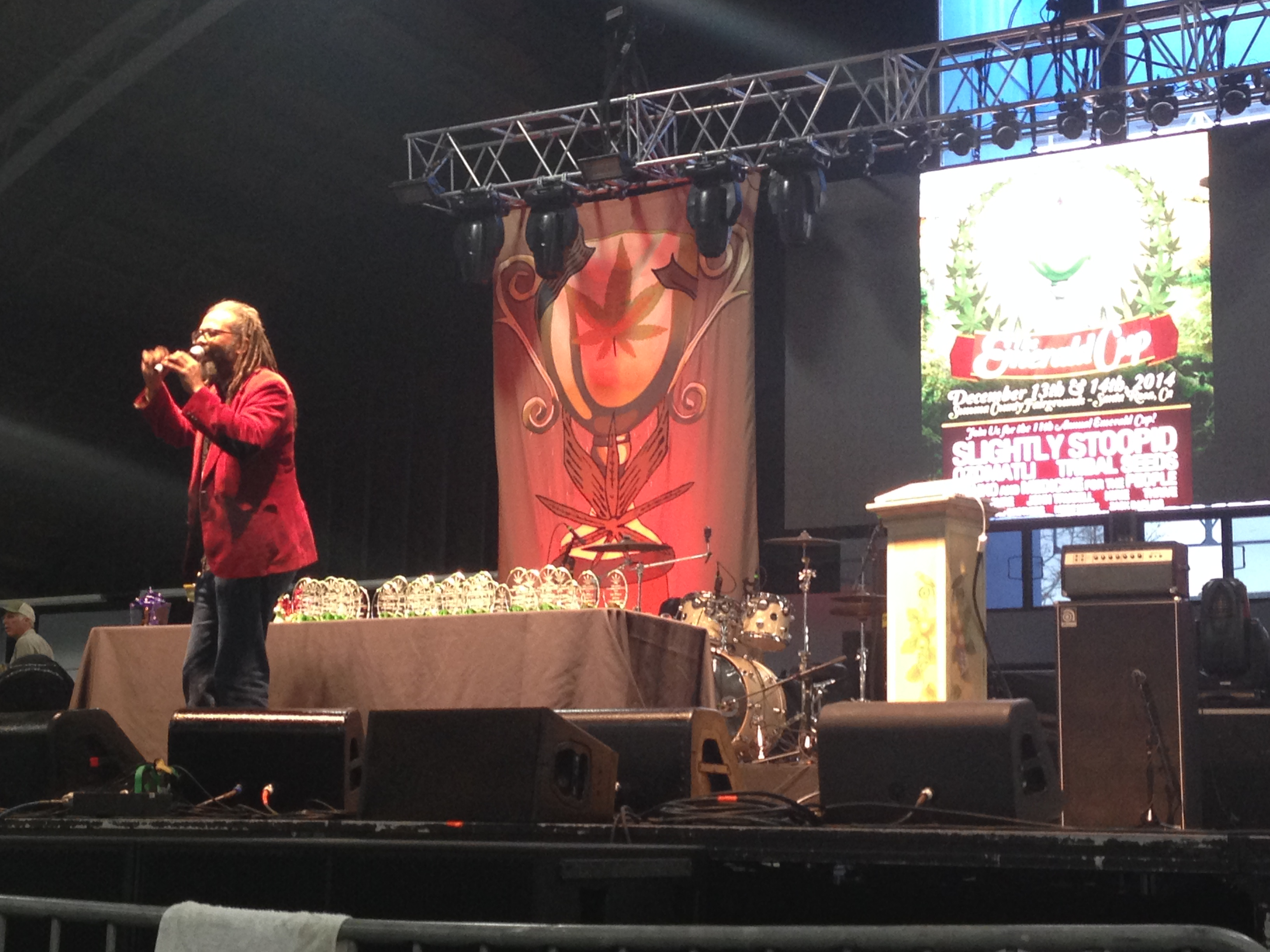
Emerald Cup awards ceremony

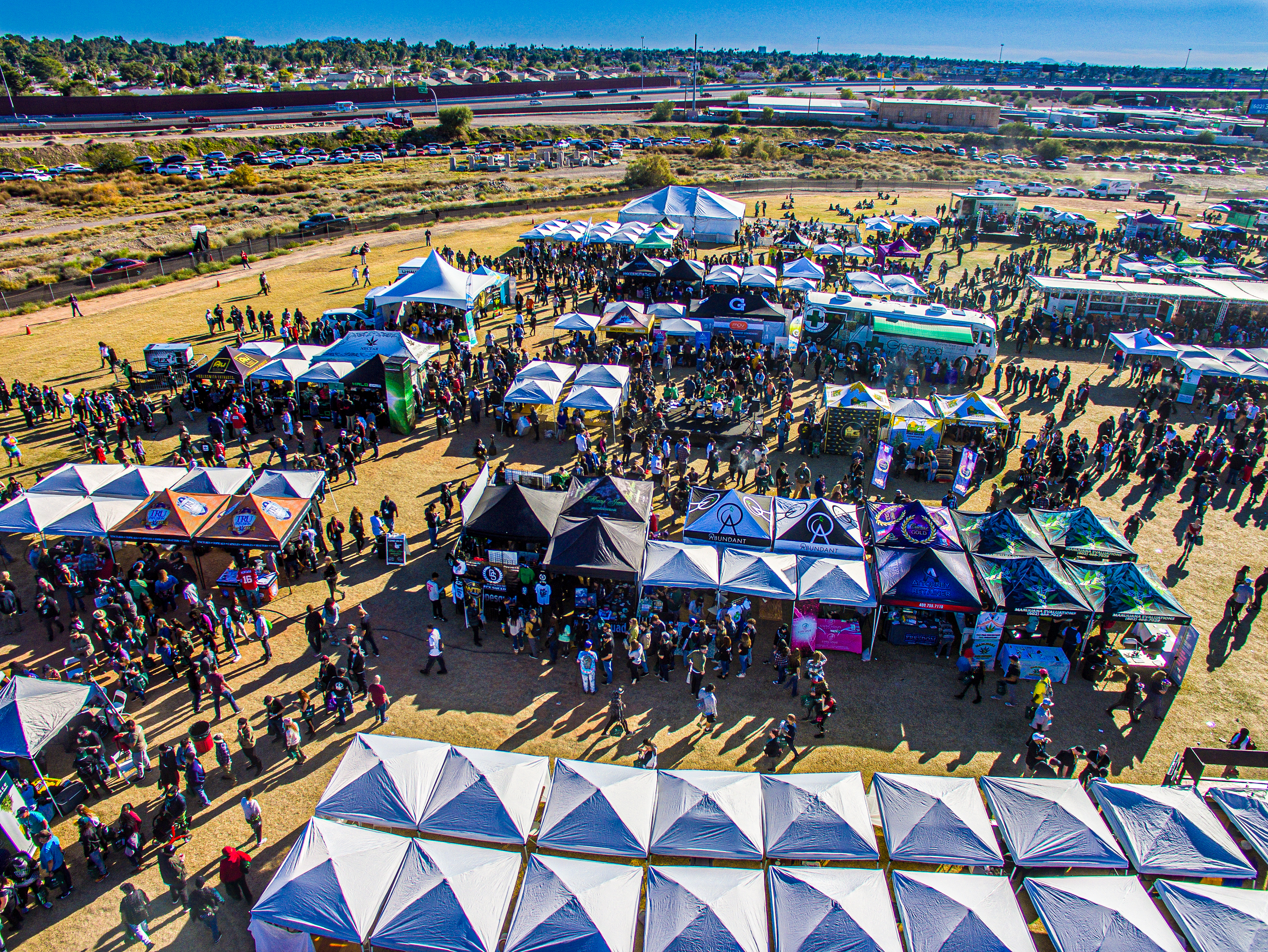
Errl Cup Arizona Overview

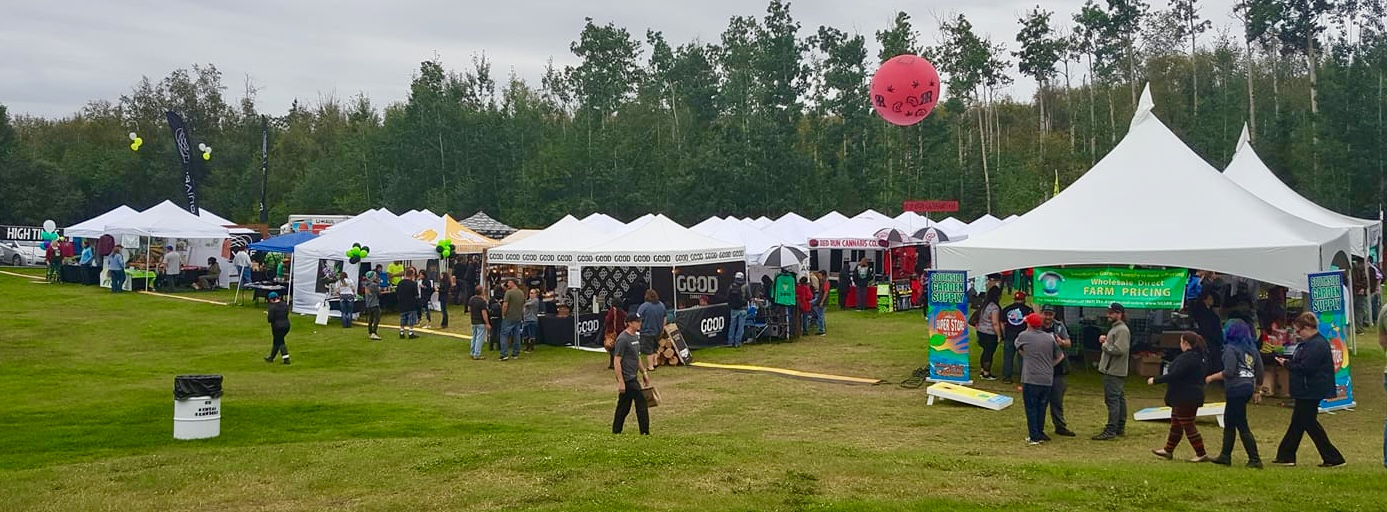
Vendors at the High Times Alaska Cup, 2018

- Best Bud, D.C. State Fair (2015–)
- Cannabis Cup
- Cultivation Classic, sun-grown craft cannabis competition (Portland, Oregon 2016–) and according to Rolling Stone, "the first cannabis flower cup in the world to analyze terpenes and minor cannabinoids of every organic flower sample contending for the award"
- Sticky Icky Carolina Cup & Title Belt Asheville NC 4/20
- Dope Cup
- DC Grower's Cup
- Emerald Cup
- The Errl Cup in Arizona established 2015
- The Grow-Off
- High Times Medical Cannabis Cup
- Legacy Cup - A cannabis festival that features a juried competition, education, and entertainment. Judging of the best cannabis products from legacy producers and growers from across the state.
- Northwest Cannabis Classic (Anchorage, Portland, Tacoma, 2015–) "a cannabis award show where we have these really awesome trophies that we award to the winners of best indica, best sativa, best hybrid, best concentrate and best edible"
- Oregon Cannabis Growers' Fair at the Oregon State Fair
- Stony Awards
- Taste of Texas Hemp Cup
- The WEEDYS Awards
