= National Cannabis Summit =

The National Cannabis Summit is an annual cannabis conference, presented by the National Cannabis Industry Association. The inaugural event was held at Denver's Colorado Convention Center in 2014.

== See also ==
- Cannabis in Colorado
