= Taste of Texas Hemp Cup =

Taste of Texas Hemp Cup is a cannabis competition in the U.S. state of Texas, first held December 10, 2020, in San Marcos, Texas. Since cannabis containing non-negligible amounts of THC was illegal in Texas, the competition was open only to hemp producers. As of 2023, the co-founder of the event, Sarah Kerver, is also president of the Texas Cannabis Council.
