= Stoner TV =

Television subgenre revolving around cannabis

Stoner TV is a subgenre of television programming that revolves around the use of marijuana. Typically, such cannabis use in a TV show is used in a comic and positive fashion. Cannabis use is one of the main themes and is used on screen by the characters. "Rudy" is the host.

== Literature ==
- Halperin, Shirley; Bloom, Steve; Chong, Tommy (2008). Pot Culture : The A-Z Guide to Stoner Language and Life. Abrams Image. ISBN 978-0-8109-9440-9. (see chapters Must-See Stoner TV and A Brief History of Classic Stoner TV (p. 170 - 174))
