= Tokers Bowl =

Cannabis event in Vancouver, Canada

- Status: Defunct
- Frequency: Annually
- Venue: BC Marijuana Party Bookstore
- Locations: Vancouver, British Columbia
- Country: Canada
- Inaugurated: 2002
- Most recent: 2005
- Sponsor: Cannabis Culture
- Website: tokersbowl.com

Tokers Bowl was an annual cannabis event held between 2002 and 2005 at British Columbia Marijuana Party Bookstore, in Vancouver. It was canceled in 2006 following a raid by the Vancouver Police. It was held in May or July and was described as "like a Cannabis Cup North".

== See also ==
- Cannabis in British Columbia
- List of cannabis competitions
