= Hanfparade =

German hemp legalization demonstration

Logo

The Hanfparade (English: Hemp Parade) is a hemp legalization demonstration in Berlin. It has taken place each year in August since 1997.

The traditional course of the parade floats make a prelude through the German capital. In a demonstration, thousands give hemp and cannabis their attention. At the end of the demonstration a closing speech takes place.

The parade offers a variety of hemp-related entertainment. The main stage offers mixes of speeches and live-music. National and international musicians entertain the visitors, which often includes high-ranking personalities from politics, culture, medicine and the legalization movement. In the speakers corner an open microphone waits for contributions.

The demonstrations so far have always been peaceful, which may be because the police rarely pursue offenses against cannabis possession laws.

== 2022 ==
The Hanfparade took place on 13 August 2022. The motto for the 26th Hanfparade was Hemp is for everyone.

== 2021 ==
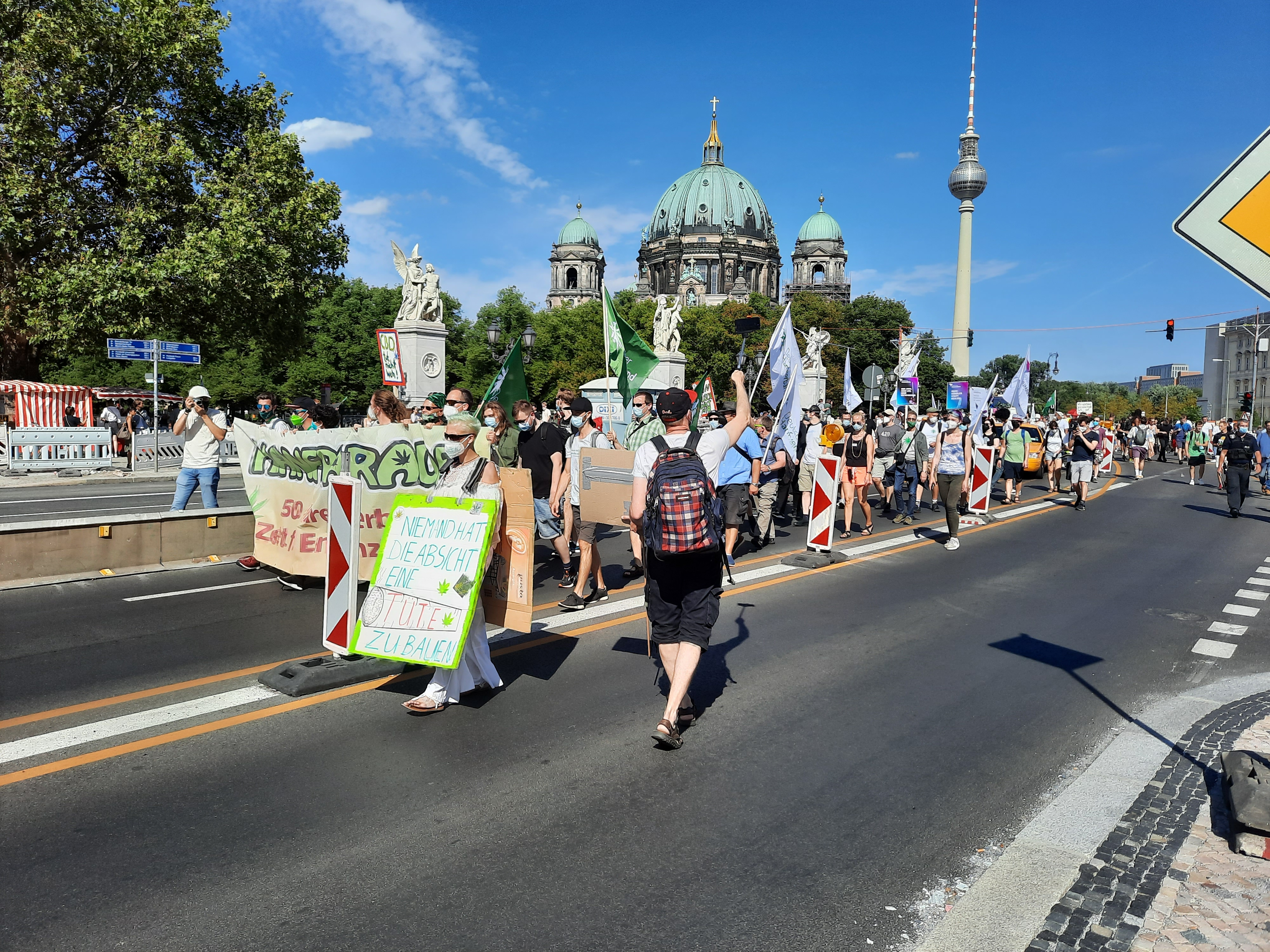
Hanfparade 2021

The Hanfparade took place on 14 August 2021. The motto was 50 years of prohibition - time for emanzipation.

== 2020 ==
The Hanfparade took place on 8 August 2020. The motto was Hemp is good - legal even better. As a result of the Corona pandemic the Hanfparade took place only in the virtual space with a live video stream.

== 2019 ==
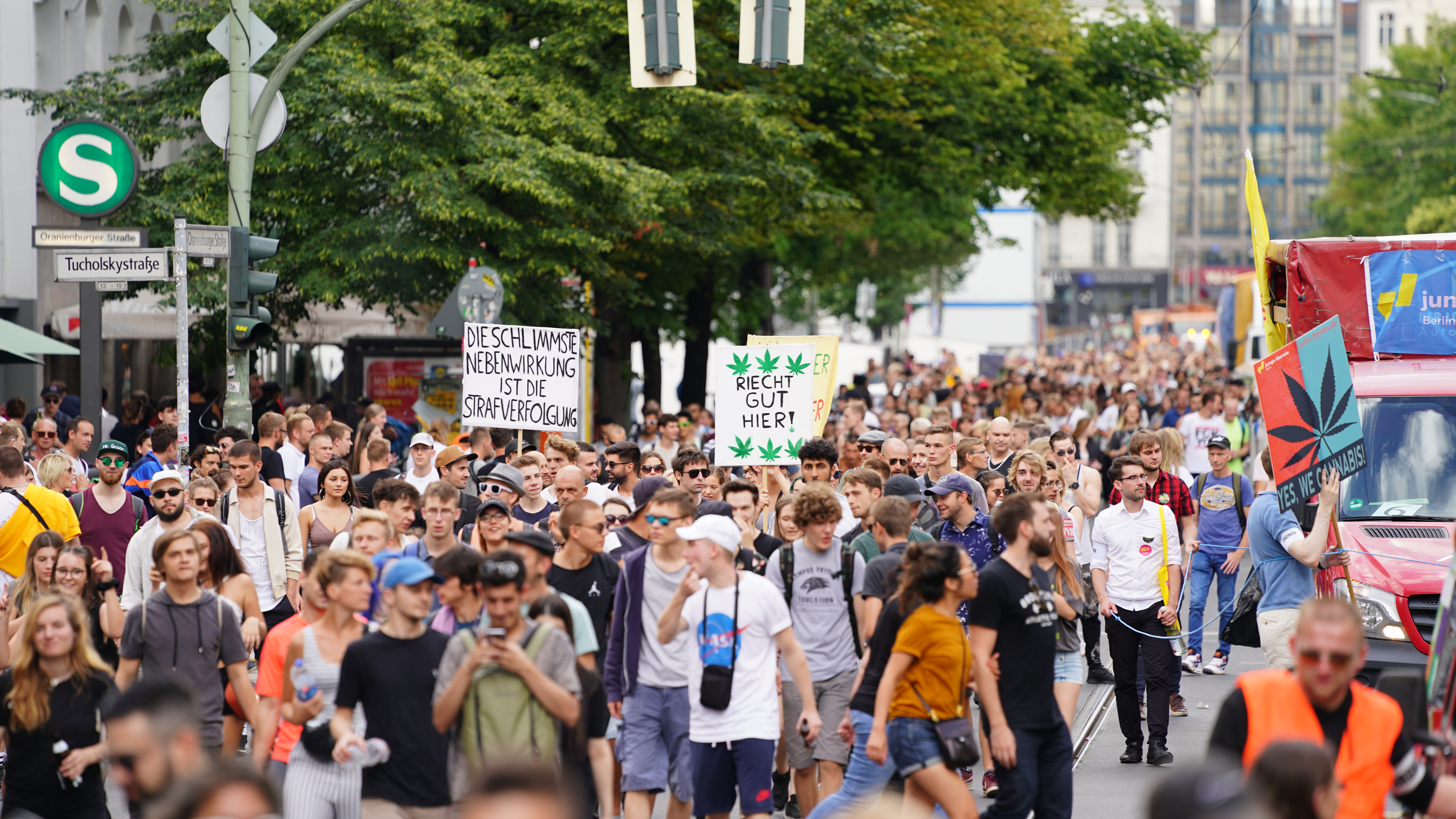
Hanfparade 2019

The motto of this year Hanfparade was Legalisation only with you and took place on 10 August 2019.

== 2018 ==
The Hanfparade took place on 11 August with the motto Education, not prohibition.

== 2017 ==
The Hanfparade took place on 12 August. The motto of the year was We're getting farther.

== 2016 ==
The 20th anniversary of the Hanfparade took place on 13 August 2016. The motto was "Legalization is in the air".

== 2015 ==
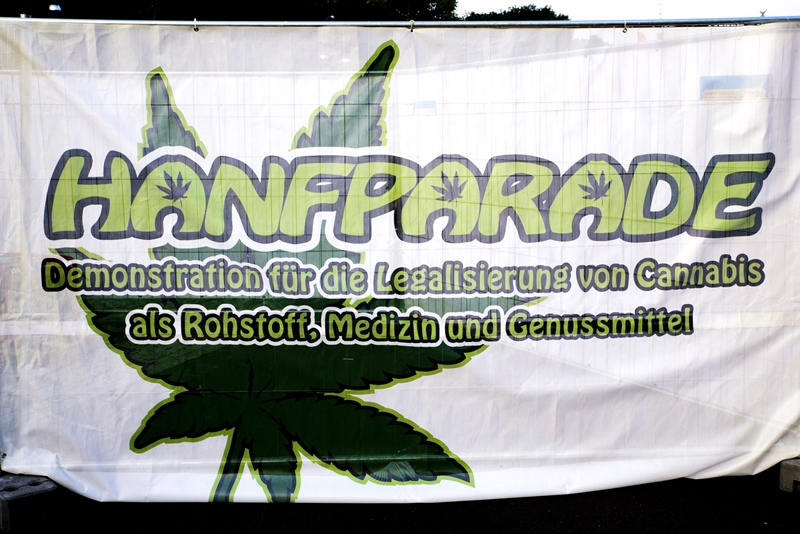
Hanfparade 2015

The Hanfparade took place on 8 August. The motto was Use Hemp!.

== 2014 ==
The Hanfparade took place on 9 August. The motto was Green light for the legalisation.

== 2013 ==
The Hanfparade took place on 10 August. The motto was My choice? Legal Cannabis!.

== 2012 ==
The Hanfparade took place on 11 August. The motto was Freedom, Health, Justice.

== 2011 ==
The Hanfparade took place on 6 August. The motto was 40 years are enough - no more narcotics law!.

== 2010 ==
The next Hanfparade took place on Saturday 7 August 2010. It started at 1:00 p.m. with a speech between TV tower and railway station Alexanderplatz in Berlin under the slogan "Cannabis is (World) Culture". The Hanfparade requests that the entire hemp culture, both the art of using hemp as raw material, as food, as stimulant and as medicine, is allocated to the intangible cultural heritage of UNESCO and removed from the present authorities, which are focused solely on criminal prosecution.

== 2009 ==
Hanfparade took place on 1 August 2009 in Berlin. The motto was "For free choice". The demonstration started at Alexanderplatz and went to Brandenburger Tor.

== 2008 ==
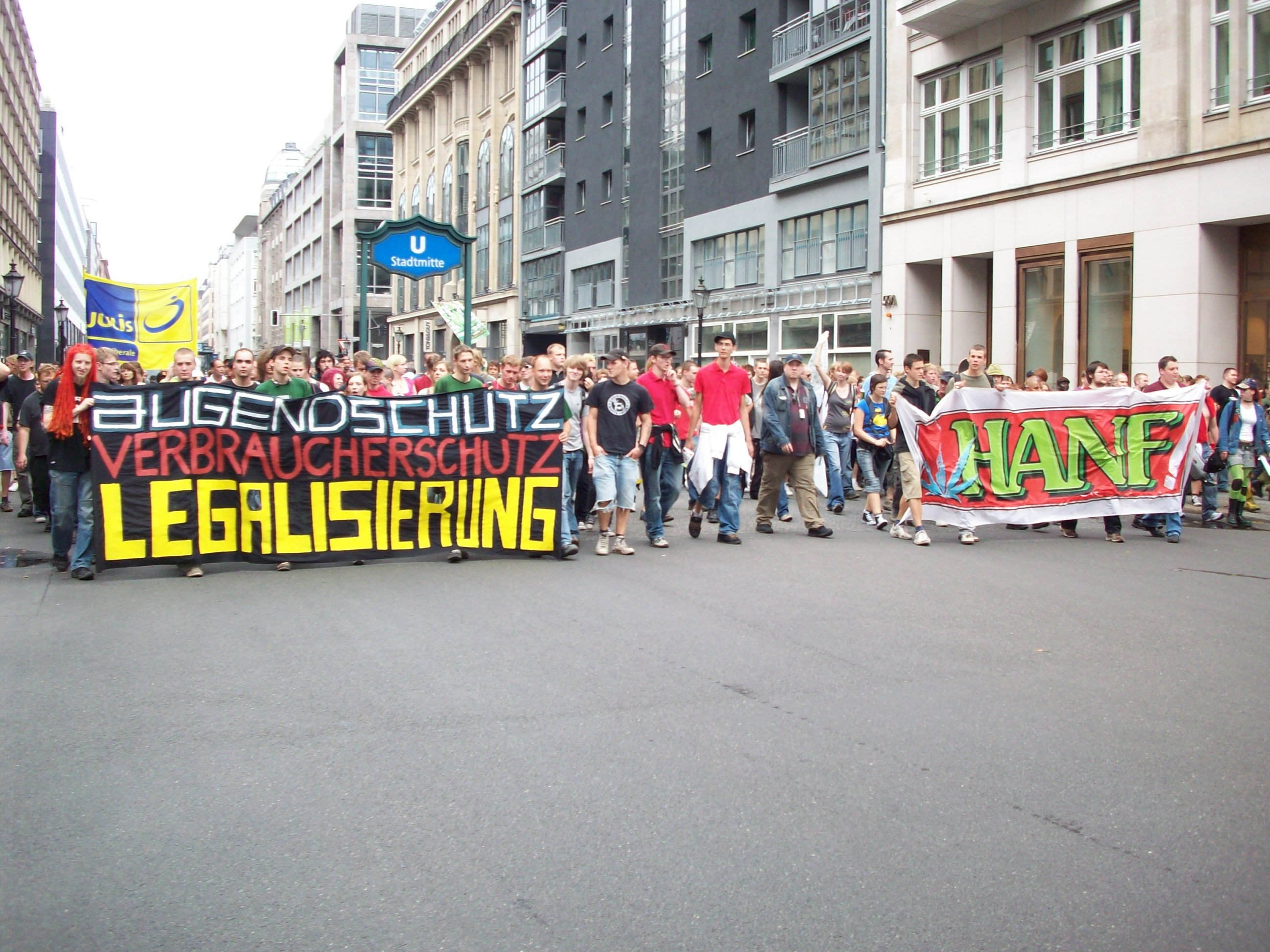
Hanfparade 2008 (Berlin)

The 12th Hanfparade took place on 2 August 2008 from TV Tower at Alexanderplatz to Leipziger Platz, next to Potsdamer Platz. The motto was "Youth protection, Consumer protection, Legalize".

== 2007 ==
The 11th Hanfparade took place on 25 August 2007 in Berlin.

== 2006 ==
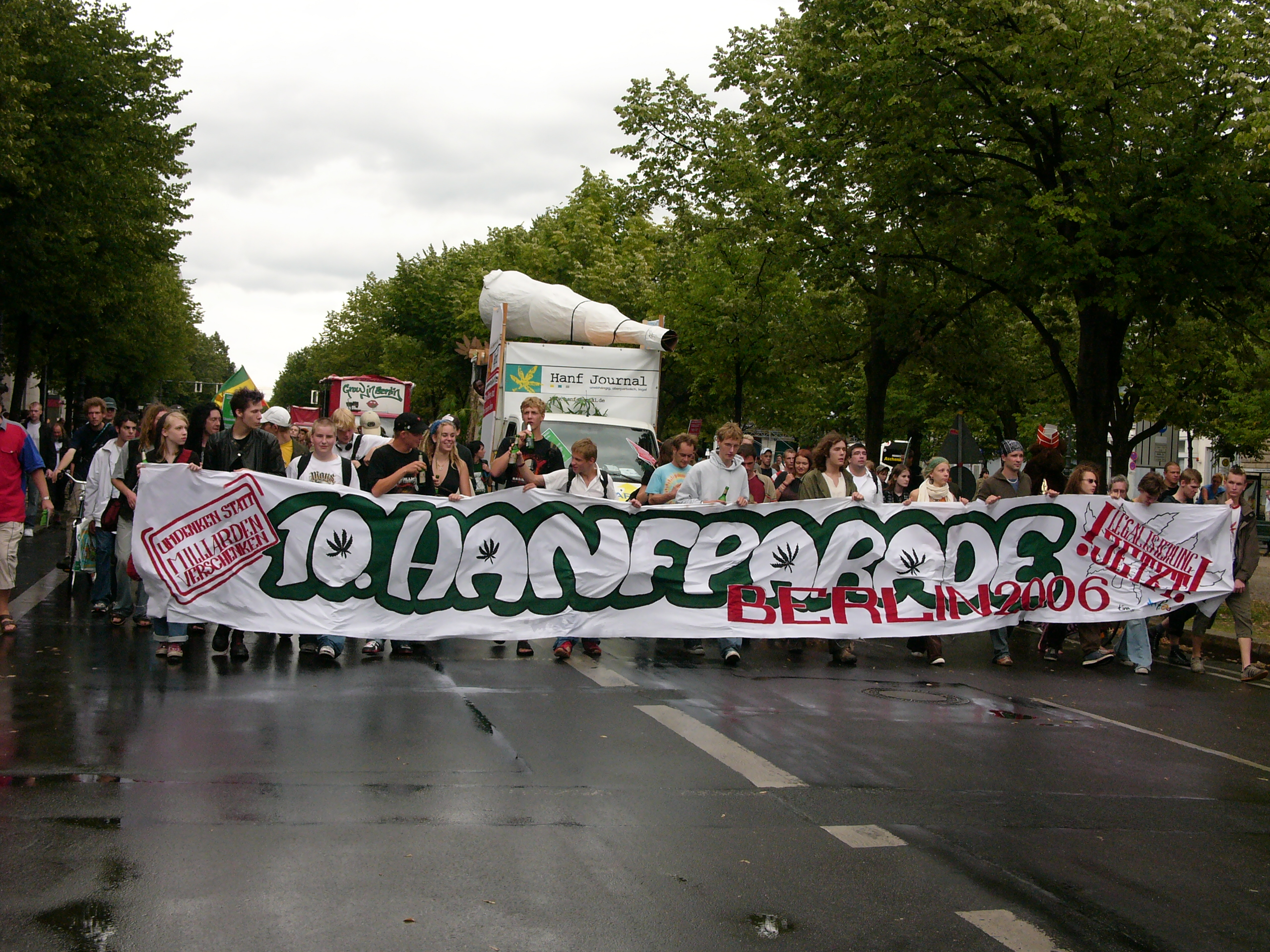
Hanfparade 2006

The 10th Hanfparade took place on 5 August 2006 in Berlin. It took place under the motto, "Legalization now! Reorient your opinion instead of giving billions away!" and led a march down Unter den Linden to the Brandenburger Tor from the Alexanderplatz across the Oranienburger. Intermediate demonstrations took place in front of Kunsthaus Tacheles and the British embassy. Approximately 1500 participants took part in the parade. At the Brandenburger Gate there was a hemp market with several hemp panels and hemp plants. The police managed to cut several thousand hemp plants down at the Brandenburger Gate, although the organizers had permission for it. At the conclusion of the demonstration there was a six-hour closing speech at the Platz des 18. März.

== 2005 ==
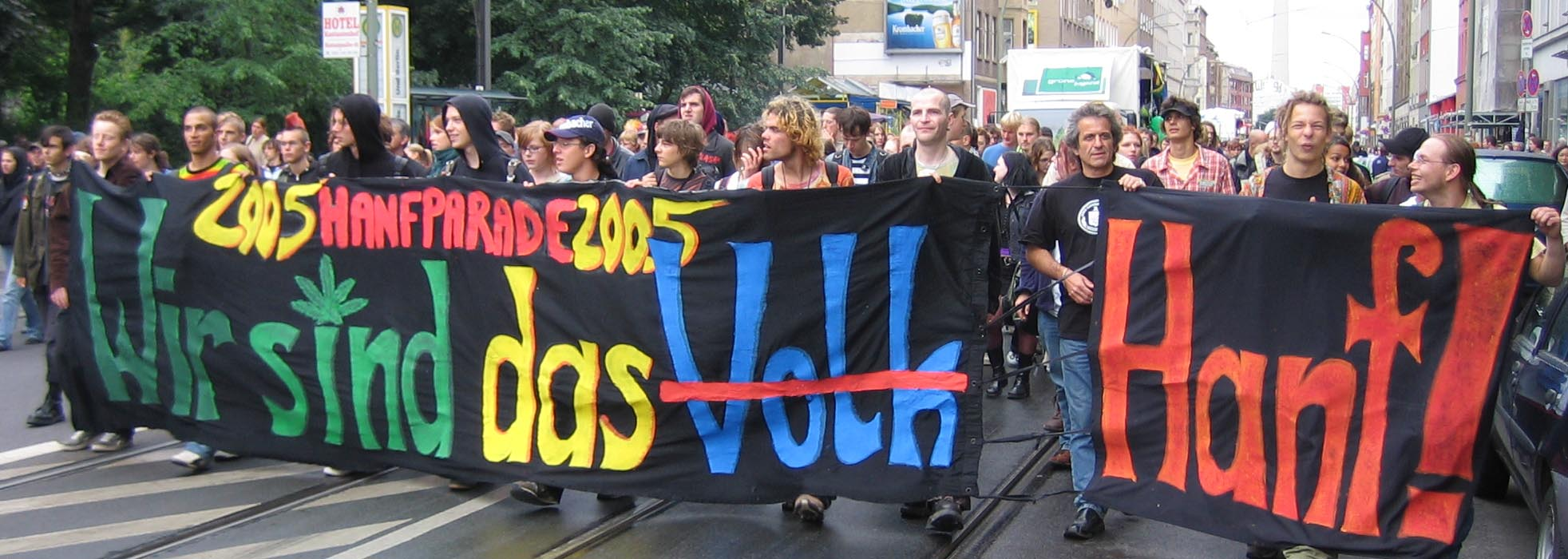
Banner of the Hanfparade 2005

The Hanfparade took place on 13 August 2005 in Berlin. It took place under the motto, "We are the hemp!"—a play on the slogan "Wir sind das Volk!" used by the East Germans before the opening of the inner German border. The demonstration started at 12:00 at the city hall Rotes Rathaus accompanied by five parade floats and by the citizens of Berlin city center. The parade was again smaller than in the previous years with 1000 to 1200 participants. This was because (among other things) the closing speech was forbidden at short notice by the office responsible for green area.

The police enacted substantial controls and wrote 24 announcements because of offenses against the BtMG (German narcotic law).

== 2004 ==
The Hanfparade took place on 14 August 2004 at the Alexanderplatz in Berlin at 12:00. About 3,500 people attended the demonstration, and at the meeting area about 8000 were present.

== 2003 ==
The Hanfparade began at 12:00 on 23 August 2003 with a 60-minute demonstration before the Federal Ministry of Finance at the William route (between Leipziger road and Niederkirchnerstrasse) in Berlin. The parade of 13 floats ran peacefully. There were announcements however due to offenses against the Betäubungsmittelgesetz.

About 5,000 demonstrators, including Hans-Christian Ströbele (a Green Party member of the German Bundestag), representatives of the Green Party Youths, The Left Party and the Grey Panthers Party, participated in the demonstration.

== 2002 ==
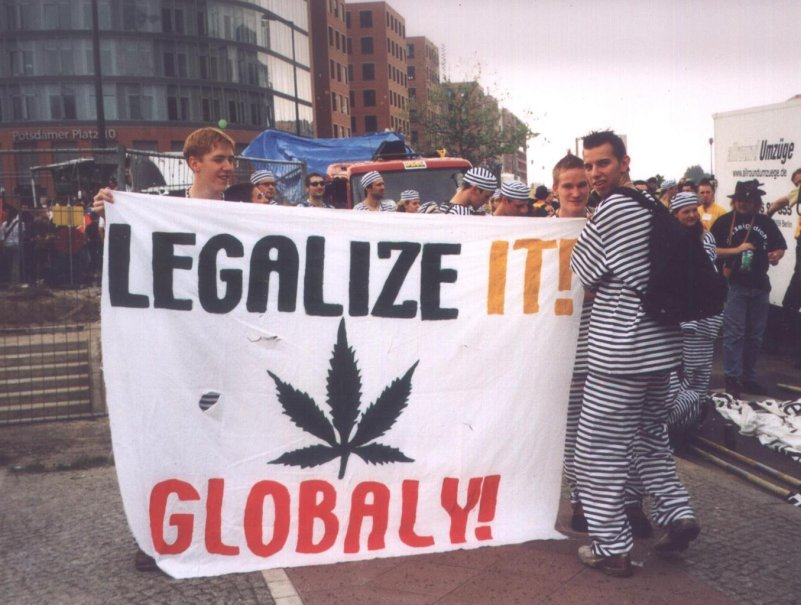
Hanfparade 2002

The 2002 Hanfparade included a march to the Kaiser Wilhelm Memorial Church with about 10,000 people. The participants motto was "For hemp use! Against hemp abuse! Education instead of prohibition!"

An excerpt from a speech of Hans Christian Ströbele was used in the song Gebt das Hanf frei! from Stefan Raab.

== 2001 ==
"No war against plants" was the slogan of the 5th Hanfparade. The visitors celebrated with a party before marching on the Berlin City Hall. "I'm a stoner and it is good to be it!", people were saying.

== 2000 ==
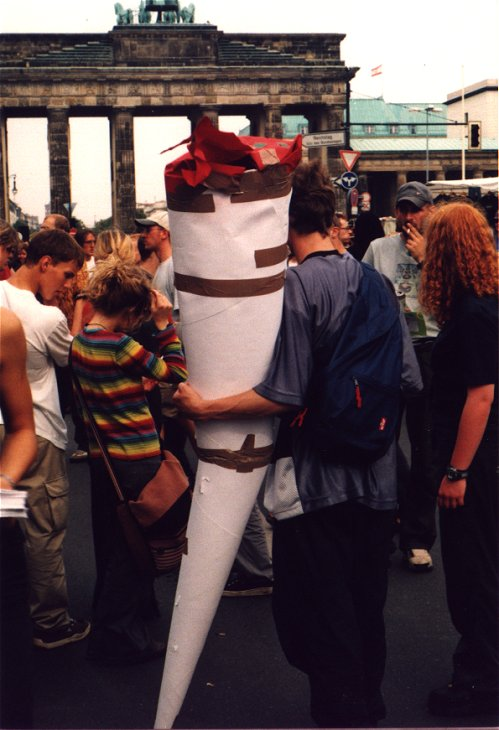
Hanfparade 2000 at the Brandenburg Gate

For the millennium Hanfparade participants from all over the world demanded, "Legalize it globally." Only a storm could impair the good tendency of 10,000 of the participants somewhat.

== 1999 ==
Hopes of a new and better millennium drove several tens of thousands of people to the hemp parade. Their motto was, "Into the future with hemp." For the first time, representatives of all parties except the Christian Democratic Union spoke.

== 1998 ==
In the election year, nearly 50,000 people flew into Berlin under the slogan, "The fight continues," they demanded the legalization of hemp from the new Federal Government.

== 1997 ==
Ten thousand followed the call "of the Herumschweifenden Haschrebellen" and H.A.N.F., a registered association for the first country wide demonstration for hemp. With their route to the Brandenburger Gate they demanded "Legalization now!"
