= Boise Hempfest =

American annual cannabis rights event

- Poster for 2019 Event
- Status: Active
- Genre: Activism & Festival
- Frequency: Annually
- Venue: Julia Davis Park
- Locations: Boise, Idaho
- Country: United States
- Inaugurated: August 16, 2016
- Founder: Serra Frank
- Previous event: May 13, 2023
- Next event: May 11, 2024
- Participants: Volunteers and vendors
- Leader: Serra Frank
- Patron: Public
- Website: boisehempfest.org

Boise Hempfest is an annual cannabis rights activist event and festival in Boise, Idaho, which has been held since 2016. The "Hempfest" name is licensed by Seattle Hempfest. The coordinator of the inaugural and subsequent events was Serra Frank. The fourth annual event took place on April 20, 2019. The 2020 event was scheduled for April 18, 2020; but was postponed due to the Idaho government mandated "stay at home order" issued at the beginning of the COVID-19 pandemic.

The event is approved and permitted annually through the City of Boise Department of Parks and Recreation. It is dubbed a free and family friendly "Cannabis Education Event" that offers 12 hours of live entertainment and speakers from the Julia Davis Park bandshell; numerous food trucks and vendors in a "Munchies Market"; informational, non-profit, craft, and commercial vendors in a "Vendor Village"; access to local activism groups and citizens' initiatives in a "Cannabis Cove"; educational displays in an "Enchanted Forest"; educational presentations in a "Hemposium"; and children-oriented activities and games in a free "Kidland."

== See also ==
- Cannabis in Idaho
