= Emerald Empire Hempfest =

Cannabis event in Eugene, Oregon, U.S.

- Status: Active
- Genre: Political
- Date: Third weekend in July
- Frequency: Annually
- Locations: Eugene, Oregon, U.S.
- Country: United States
- Inaugurated: 2003
- People: Dan Koozer (Executive Director)
- Website: emeraldempirehempfest.com

Emerald Empire Hempfest is a cannabis festival in Eugene, Oregon, in the United States.

The festival has been held on the third weekend in July since 2003. The event is free at attend.

In 2016, the festival's executive director, Dan Koozer, filed a petition in Lane County Circuit Court after being denied permission to host the event at Maurie Jacobs Park.
