= Missoula Hempfest =

Cannabis event in Missoula, Montana, US

- Logo
- Location: Missoula, Montana
- Country: United States

Missoula Hempfest is an annual cannabis event held in Missoula, Montana, in the United States. The fifth and tenth festivals were held in Caras Park in 2000 and 2005, respectively.

== See also ==
- Cannabis in Montana
- Code of the West (2012 film)
