= Shared consumption =

Shared consumption (also joint consumption, dyadic consumption) is a type of group consumption where people in a group are interacting one with another, with joint activity involving interdependence (a typical example is the family meal). Joint activity usually involves people that know each other (friends, family, colleagues), although shared consumption is possible between strangers (e.g., at a networking event). The term does not cover a group merely sharing the environment without significant interaction (like strangers in a restaurant) or using online virtual participation.

== Types ==
Shared consumption is distinct from related group consumption types:

- collaborative consumption, a model emphasizing resource sharing and community-based access to goods or services. While collaborative consumption focuses on practical benefits like cost savings and sustainability, shared consumption highlights the social and emotional dimensions of participating in activities with others;
- collective consumption of goods that are produced and consumed by society on a large scale (mostly non-rivalrous public goods, like roads, schools, police).

The idea of joint consumption was adapted and applied at the micro-level of household economics In this context, joint consumption refers to household public goods. These are goods and services consumed jointly by members of the household, such as housing (e.g., heating, lighting), shared family assets, the "joint time consumption" of leisure, or consumption of utility of the couple's children. This application is conceptually consistent with the pure economic definition. The "complementarities in consumption" are seen as a primary source of the marital surplus, or the economic gains from marriage.

== Emotional intensity and satiation ==
Social psychology studies show shared experience tend to amplify emotional responses. Individuals watching a thrilling movie or engaging in a high-energy concert with friends are more likely to feel heightened emotions than if they were alone. This is a phenomenon known as "social amplification."

In addition to social amplification, shared experiences can also lead to faster emotional satiation, which is called the "collective satiation effect." Physiological studies using EEG also show that shared experiences shift attention to more emotional aspects of stimuli. This dynamic can influence both consumer preferences and retrospective enjoyment. Recalling shared experiences can be more satisfying when consumers' emotional reactions match others.

Another concept, consumption sacrifice, looks at how willing a partner may be at incurring a cost in terms of money, time, or preferences. These sacrifices can affect the emotional dynamics of shared consumption by enhancing relational bonds. When an individual sacrifices their dining choice to prioritize a partner's preference, the resulting emotions come from the activity as well as from the perceived care and commitment from their sacrifice. In shared consumption sacrifices serve as relational signals, encouraging emotional closeness. This complements other findings, claiming sacrifices in relationships enhance emotional experiences by fostering a sense of shared identity and mutual support.

== Motivations ==
Studies show that people tend to anticipate greater enjoyment when they can share experiences with friends or family. Consumers show less interest in solo leisure activities. A specific study shows that men ("agency-oriented consumers") tend to spend more when shopping with friends, while women ("communion-oriented consumers") often spend less in similar contexts.

Another study found that consumers' indulgence or restraint in a shared setting matches the behavior of companions, leading to co-indulgence or co-abstinence.

One study poses a framework that emphasize two dimensions: the chooser's social focus (relationship vs. recipient-oriented) and the consideration of consumption preferences (highlighting a recipient's preferences vs. balancing them with the chooser's preferences). In cases where there is social relationships influence decision-making, this framework applies well to shared consumption contexts.

Social influence appears when needing to send appropriate relational signals through choice making. Gift-giving is motivated by the desire to convey closeness and understanding. In shared consumption situations, like choosing a restaurant or movie in a group, individuals may prioritize options that they believe complement others' preferences to strengthen the group dynamic.

In consumption settings consumers can be motivated to compromise their own preferences with their companions' preferences. Individuals with an interdependent self-construal are more likely to accommodate others' preferences. Others with an independent self-construal might assert their own choices unless strong social cues dictate otherwise.

== See also ==
- Collaborative consumption
