= Salem Hempfest =

Defunct cannabis festival

Salem Hempfest, or Salem Hemp Fest, is a cannabis festival in Salem, Oregon, in the United States. The inaugural event was held in Riverfront Park in 2015.
