= Moscow Hemp Fest =

Annual cannabis event

- Location: Moscow, Idaho, U.S.
- Also known as: Moscow Hempfest
- Theme: Cannabis
- Website: moscowhempfest.com

The Moscow Hemp Fest (sometimes Moscow Hempfest) is an annual cannabis event held in Moscow, Idaho. It began in 1996 as a part of the University of Idaho's Mom's Weekend.

== See also ==
- Cannabis in Idaho
