= Olympia Hempfest =

Cannabis event

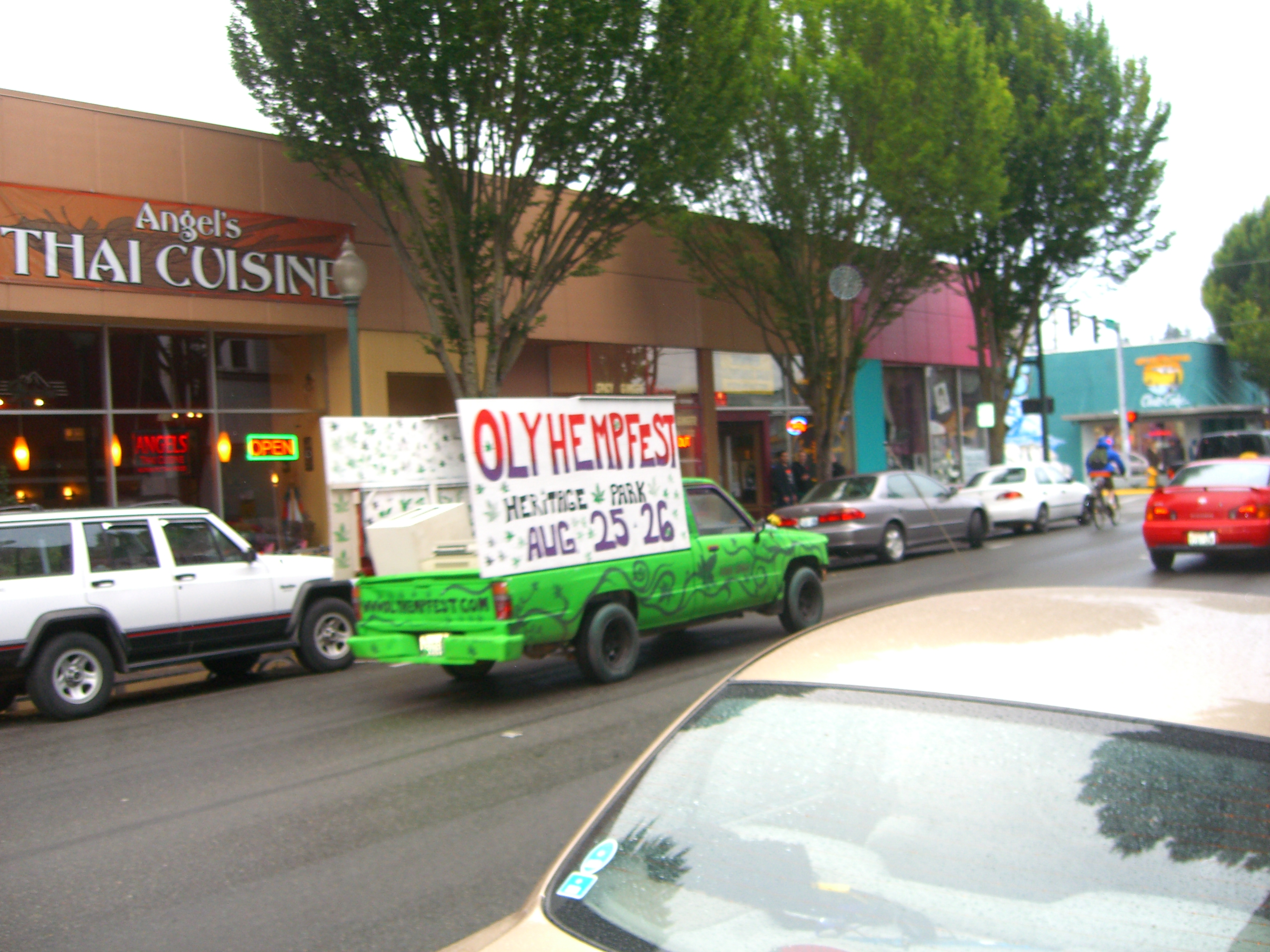
- Pickup truck with sign advertising the 2007 Hempfest
- Status: Inactive
- Genre: Political
- Frequency: Annually
- Locations: Heritage Park, Olympia, Washington
- Country: United States
- Inaugurated: 2004
- Founder: Jeremy Miller
- Previous event: July 30–31, 2016
- Attendance: c. 20,000
- Website: olympiahempfest.com

The Olympia Hempfest is an annual cannabis event in Olympia, Washington, in the United States. The event was first held in 2004, and was founded by Jeremy Miller, the same person who began the Cannabis Farmers Market in Tacoma. It attracts up to 20,000 participants. The 2015 event was held in Heritage Park in downtown Olympia.
