= MassRoots =

Cannabis community social network

MassRoots is a social network for the cannabis community. As of June 2016, it had an estimated 900,000 users. MassRoots for Business, the company’s advertising portal, has an estimated 1,000 clients as of June 2015. In 2014, MassRoots was one of the first cannabis-related companies to go public through a Registration Statement on Form S-1 and trades under the ticker "MSRT" and in August 2015, MassRoots submitted an application to up-list its stock to the Nasdaq.

== History ==
=== Foundation ===
In April 2013, co-founders Isaac Dietrich and Tyler Knight were smoking in a college apartment when they conceptualized the idea for MassRoots because, "they didn’t want their grandmothers to see pictures of them taking bong rips on Facebook." They recruited longtime friend Hyler Fortier to design the initial user interface in Photoshop and later brought in Hyler’s brother, Stewart Fortier, to develop the original iOS application.

MassRoots launched in the App Store on July 14, 2013 and in its first few weeks, gained several thousand users through Reddit, Instagram and word-of-mouth. Dietrich maxed out $17,000 in credit cards to fund the company’s operations while being turned down by dozens of Silicon Valley venture capital firms for being cannabis-related.

=== ArcView Group and seed round ===
Dietrich was invited to pitch The ArcView Group, one of the first and largest cannabis angel investment groups in the country, co-founded by Steve DeAngelo and Troy Dayton in September 2013. At the event, he met Douglas Leighton, co-founder of Dutchess Capital, who invested the first $50,000 of a $150,000 seed round. Over the course of the fall of 2013 and spring 2014, MassRoots used the funds to launch a beta version of its Android application and scale to 100,000 users.

=== Going public ===
MassRoots was organically growing by 20,000 to 30,000 users per month by March 2014. Dietrich once again pitched MassRoots to dozens of Silicon Valley venture capital firms, only to be turned away again for the same reason as before. As private financing was unavailable, MassRoots decided to go public through a Registration Statement on Form S-1, one of the first cannabis related companies to do so. Over the course of the summer of 2014, the Securities and Exchange Commission issued over 75 comments on MassRoots’ S-1 before allowing it to go effective by operation of law in September 2014.

=== Banned from iOS App Store, user campaign, and reversal ===
MassRoots broke into the top 200 fastest growing social networks in the iOS App Store in November 2014, catching Apple’s attention. The App Store determined it didn’t want a social platform entirely devoted to cannabis, so Apple permanently banned MassRoots and created a rule that all cannabis social networks were prohibited, preventing the 40% of the United States population who own iPhones and iPads from downloading its app.

In January 2015, MassRoots united the cannabis industry against this ban – over 10,000 of its then 200,000 users sent personal emails to Apple on why they love and use MassRoots. Dozens of cannabis business leaders authored a policy letter arguing that Apple’s policies were stifling innovation in the cannabis industry and holding back social progress. In February 2015, Apple reversed their policy, allowing MassRoots back into the App Store.

CEO Isaac Dietrich noted at the time, "Throughout this campaign, the MassRoots team never stopped using our iPhones, MacBooks, and iPads as a testament to Apple’s world-class products. We’d like to thank the App Store for embracing the cannabis community and continuing to set an example as a socially-progressive institution. We are excited to begin a new chapter with Apple in which we can work together to affect meaningful societal change."

=== Stock starts trading and beginning of monetization ===
MassRoots’ stock began trading under the ticker MSRT in April 2015. During its first few weeks of trading, MassRoots’ users were the primary buyers of the stock, enabling them to invest in a product they love. The week of 4/20/15, MassRoots’ stock traded over $7 million in volume and was one of the most active stocks on the entire OTC market.

By August 2015, MassRoots had broken a half million users with hundreds of millions of user-to-user interactions, providing more than enough activity to begin to monetize its network. In late August, Dietrich announced the company had begun to generate revenue through advertising, making approximately $60,000 in its first 6 weeks. The company reportedly is, "not recreating the wheel when it comes to monetization, just taking a model that worked for Facebook and Twitter and applying it to the cannabis sector." The company enables dispensaries and cannabis brands to reach their target consumers.

In 2020, the SEC announced a settlement with a group of investors led by Douglas H. Leighton in response to allegations of manipulation of the MassRoots stock price after the IPO.

== Website and mobile application ==
The mobile application for iOS and Android was launched before the web version. MassRoots allows users to interact with each other via photo or video uploads with text to accompany it, from there, users can interact with each other by liking or commenting on the post.

There is also a blog that accompanies it with posts ranging from cannabis-related news to informational posts to tips.

== In popular culture ==
- The History Channel featured MassRoots in its documentary "The Marijuana Revolution" which originally aired on Jan. 11, 2016.
