= Bobby Black (journalist) =

American journalist (born 1973)

- Born: March 27, 1973 (age 53); Brooklyn, New York, U.S.
- Education: Baruch College (CUNY) – BBA in Marketing / Graphic Design
- Occupation: Marijuana media personality / journalist
- Television: Marijuana: A Chronic History; The Howard Stern Show
- Website: worldofcannabis.museum

Bobby Black is an American gonzo journalist and marijuana multimedia personality. He is the executive director of the World of Cannabis Museum Project and writer/host of the cannabis history column & podcast Cannthropology. He is also the former senior editor and columnist for the cannabis counter-culture magazine High Times. His involvement at High Times included: production director and associate art director; writing the monthly lifestyle and entertainment column "Almost Infamous,"; writing feature articles and interviews (interviewed 2012 Presidential candidate Gary Johnson, actor Bruce Campbell); creator and producer of the High Times magazine's annual Miss High Times beauty pageant; producer and host of the annual High Times Doobie Awards for music; lead reporter, judge, and competition coordinator for the High Times Amsterdam Cannabis Cup and the High Times Medical Cannabis Cup; A&R, producer, liner notes and art director for High Volume: The Stoner Rock Collection CD (High Times Records). Bobby also hosted the stoner rock show Contact High on Sirius Satellite Radio's Hard Attack channel from 2004 to 2008, and the podcast Blazin' With Bobby Black on Cannabis Radio.

== High Times (1994–2015) ==
Bobby Black began his career at High Times magazine in September 1994 as a production intern in the art department while still a senior in college. After graduating, he was hired full-time and was soon promoted to Production Manager. Over the following decade, he was further promoted to Production Director then Associate Art Director, and oversaw production of nearly all of the brand's projects, including: the regular monthly magazine and offshoot magazines and special editions such as The Best of High Times quarterly editions, Hemp Times, Grow America and Medical Marijuana magazines; books, videos and calendars, and all promotional materials for the brand's events, such as the Cannabis Cup. During this time, he also began writing small articles for the magazine such as book and record reviews, and interviewing members of several prominent heavy metal bands like Type O Negative, Pantera, Sepultura, and Slayer—eventually graduating to feature length articles, and coming to the realization that writing rather than graphic design was his true calling and passion. In 2005, he officially transitioned from the art department to the editorial department when he was named Senior Editor.

=== Almost Infamous ===
In 2004, Black convinced the magazine's editors to give him a monthly column in which to tell some of the many misadventures he'd had while working at the magazine. He called it Almost Infamous—a play on the film title Almost Famous, in which an average young rock and roll fan who aspires to be a journalist ends up befriending and traveling with a famous band and ends up becoming famous in his own right. The first installment, about the time he got to meet and smoke pot with Ozzy Osbourne, ran in the final issue of Grow America magazine—all subsequent installments appeared in High Times. The column ran for 12 years, with the final installment appearing in the February 2016 issue. In the last few years, Black also released video accompaniments to many of his columns on his YouTube channel.

=== Doobie Awards ===
The High Times Doobie Awards for music (a.k.a. The Doobies) were originally created by editor Steve Bloom and held in New York City each fall. After Bloom's departure from the magazine in 2006, production of the awards show was turned over to Black, who relocated it to Austin and incorporate it into High Times' long-running annual party at the SXSW music festival (which was also founded and formerly run by Bloom). Black produced and hosted the concert/show from 2006 until High Times discontinued it in 2013.

=== The Cannabis Cup ===
For many years, Black held the honor of being the staff member who had attended the most number of Cannabis Cup events. His first Cannabis Cup was in 1994 in Amsterdam—the first year it was fully opened to the public. Black ran judge registration at the Cup for several years, as well as serving as a member of the video crew who shot the various concerts each night at the Melkweg club, which over the years included performances by such artists as Jefferson Starship, Patti Smith, Fishbone, Steel Pulse, and Rita Marley. After High Times began hosting Cannabis Cups in the United States in 2010, Black became the event's lead reporter—hosting the video coverage of the events and interviewing numerous celebrities and sponsors. He also acted as a cannabis judge for numerous competitions, and even served as one of the Cup's two competition coordinators from 2012–2014.

=== Miss High Times ===
In 2004, Black pitched the concept of creating an ongoing contest/segment in the magazine called Miss High Times. The inspiration came from Maxim magazine's Hometown Hottie feature, as well as Penthouse Magazine's Pet of the Month/Year contest. The idea was that regular girls who loved weed would send in their photos to be featured in them magazine each month, and become finalists to eventually be chosen as the magazine's "smokesmodel" for that year. The contest was immediately popular, with thousands of young women sending in photos for consideration. In 2006, with the support of then editor-in-chief Steven Hager, the contest was turned into an actual pageant that was held in Negril, Jamaica for two years before being moved to New York and eventually being incorporated into the annual US Cannabis Cup awards in Denver each April. Black ran the contest for 10 years, until it was discontinued in 2015.

=== High Volume: The Stoner Rock Collection ===
In 2004, Black partnered with High Times Records' president Michael Esterson to produce a rock and roll compilation album entitled High Volume: The Stoner Rock Collection. The album featured original songs from some of the top artists in the stoner rock genre at the time, many of whom Black had relationships with through his coverage of the scene in High Times and his Sirius radio show Contact High. Featured artists included Clutch, Corrosion of Conformity, High on Fire, and Orange Goblin, as well as members of Monster Magnet, Kyuss and Eyehategod among others. In addition to handling all of the A&R, Black also wrote the liner notes and designed the promotional materials and cd packaging, which featured photos of Fuse metal VJ Mistress Juliya.

== On-Air Hosting ==
=== Contact High ===
From 2004–2008, Black hosted a weekly music show on Sirius Satellite Radio's Hard Attack channel called Contact High. He was offered the show by program director Jose Mangin after being invited on as a guest for a 4/20 special Mangin that hosted. The show spotlighted a variety of heavy and psychedelic rock bands that fell under the umbrella term "stoner rock", as well as news about cannabis and brief highlights from some of Black's High Times articles. The show also featured occasional in-studio interviews and performances by some of the bands played on the show, including Monster Magnet, Corrosion of Conformity, Clutch, The Sword, Wino, and Seventh Void (featuring members of Type O Negative). Despite its popularity, the show was canceled in 2008 due to the illicit nature of its cannabis theme during Sirius' merger with XM in 2008.

=== Blazin' With Bobby Black ===
Shortly after leaving High Times in November 2015, Black was approached by a representative of the Revolver Podcast network about hosting his own weekly podcast. Titled Blazin' With Bobby Black, the "potcast" first aired in January 2016 and featured interviews with numerous prominent figures in cannabis culture and entertainment, including NORML's Allen St. Pierre, former High Times editors Steven Hager and Steve Bloom, and comedians Doug Benson and Tommy Chong. In spring of 2017, after his contract with Revolver was up, Bobby transferred the show to Cannabis Radio where it remains to this day. After a year-long hiatus starting in the fall of 2017, Black began releasing some new episodes sporadically in summer 2018—including the 50th episode featuring award-winning actor and counterculture icon Peter Fonda.

=== Cannthropology ===
Presented by the World of Cannabis Museum Project, Cannthropology is a podcast that explores the history of cannabis culture one artifact and interview at a time. The podcast was launched in April 2020 and is available on all major podcast providers, as well as Cannabis Radio, Haze Radio, and on the World of Cannabis Museum website.

== Post-High Times ==
Since leaving High Times, Black has gone on to work with several other cannabis publications. In December 2016, he joined Greenleaf magazine as their West Coast editor, where each issue he penned and designed the cover feature, as well as a two-page column based on his podcast Blazin' With Bobby Black, Then in September 2017, he was tapped by Denver-based Sensi magazine to help launch their three new editions in Southern California (Los Angeles, San Diego and Orange County), all three of which he edited and managed every month until leaving in May 2018 to accept the position as chief operating officer of the cannabis genetics company Crockett Family Farms. Soon after parting ways with Crockett Family Farms in June 2019, Black began working with another cannabis firm United Cannabis as a media/marketing consultant. Black also hosts the red carpet interviews at the various Cannabis Business Awards events hosted by Cloverleaf University.

== Higher Way Travel ==
In December 2016, Bobby and his wife April Black founded Higher Way Travel—a cannabis travel agency specializing in 420-friendly vacations, destinations and events. The agency has worked with a number of popular cannabis events including the Hawaii Cannabis Expo, the Dab-A-Doo hash competition, the Cannabis Business Awards, and the Legends Valley Music Festival, as well as hosting some of their events such as the Higher Health Retreat, Surf & Terps bus tour in Hawaii, and the Baked on the Beach celebrations in Jamaica and Hawaii.

== World of Cannabis Museum ==
In August 2019, Bobby was named the executive director of the new World of Cannabis Museum project. He is currently in the process of developing the new cannabis culture history museum which is planned to open in early 2024. In April 2020, he launched a new cannabis history blog and podcast related to the museum called Cannthropology, a version of which is published monthly in Leaf Magazines.

== Leaf Magazine ==
In fall 2020, Bobby became a regular contributor to Leaf Magazine when they began publishing his cannabis history blog Cannthropology as monthly column. Since then, he's also contributed numerous other articles, including product reviews, news stories, obituaries, profiles, and cover features, including interviews with artists Alex Grey and Allyson Grey and actor/comedian Cheech Marin. In February 2022, he began working at Leaf full-time as the Content Director for their California edition and Competition director for their cannabis competition, The Leaf Bowl.
