= Super Lemon Haze =

Cannabis strain

- Genus: Cannabis
- Species: Cannabis sativa subsp. sativa
- Hybrid parentage: Lemon Skunk × Super Silver Haze
- Cultivar group: Haze family
- Breeder: Franco Loja, Green House Seed Co.
- Origin: Amsterdam, The Netherlands, late 1990s

Super Lemon Haze is a sativa-dominant cannabis strain (also referred to as a "cultivar") in the haze family of strains. It was originally bred by Franco Loja from the Netherlands-based Green House Seed Co. as a cross between two other strains: Lemon Skunk and Super Silver Haze.

Popular on the West Coast and British Columbia, Super Lemon Haze has been a two-time High Times Cannabis Cup winner from 2008 and 2009, Medical Cannabis Cup, and Spannabis Cup winner. Super Lemon Haze can be described as having a fresh lemon aroma, with an earthy, citrus flavor.

== Characteristics ==
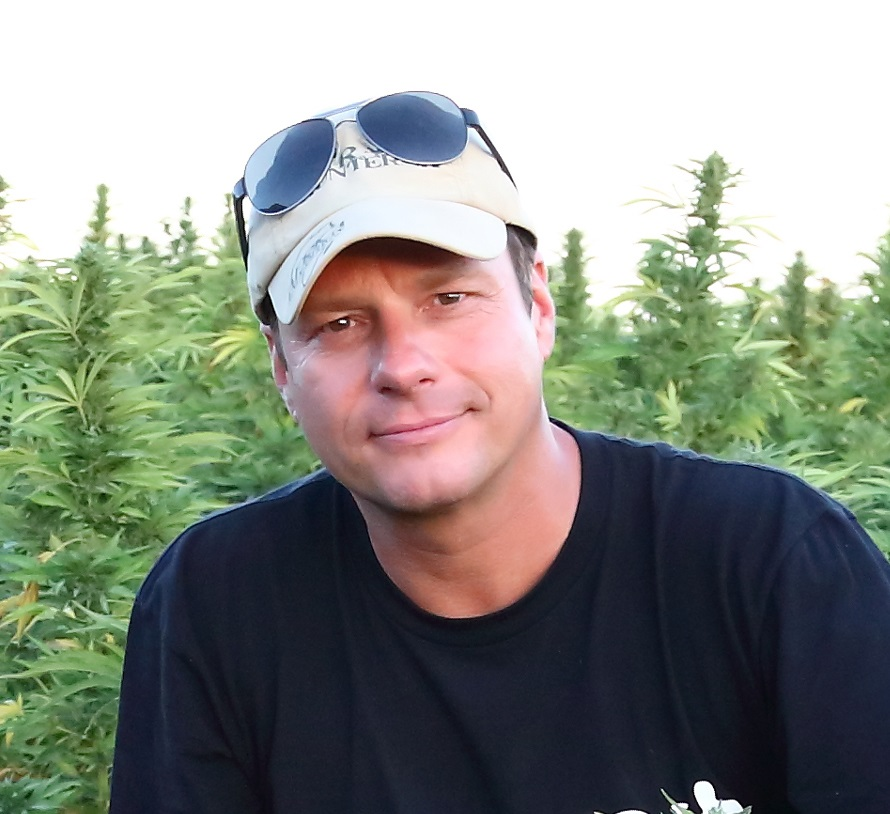
Arjan Roskam, owner and founder of Green House Seed Co.

Super Lemon Haze traces its genetic lineage from two specific strains; Lemon Skunk and Super Silver Haze, which trace their lineage from Skunk #1 and a three-way cross of Skunk #1, Haze, and Northern Lights #5. Although the Super Lemon Haze strain predominantly features sativa genetics, their flowers come in all shapes and sizes, with a bright-green hue and a dense amount of trichomes. The pistils on this strain are a bright orange color when the plant is fully matured.

As cannabis is traditionally a photoperiod plant, Super Lemon Haze's grow period can last between 10 and 12 weeks. The yield is fairly high, with a range from anywhere between 600 and 800 grams per square meter per plant. According to Green House, this strain is best suited for growing in equatorial, tropical, subtropical and temperate climates, as its longer flowering period would present some difficulties in a colder environment.

In addition, Green House developed an autoflower version by hybridizing the plant's genetics with a ruderalis, which grows irrespective of the photoperiod.

== Medicinal properties ==
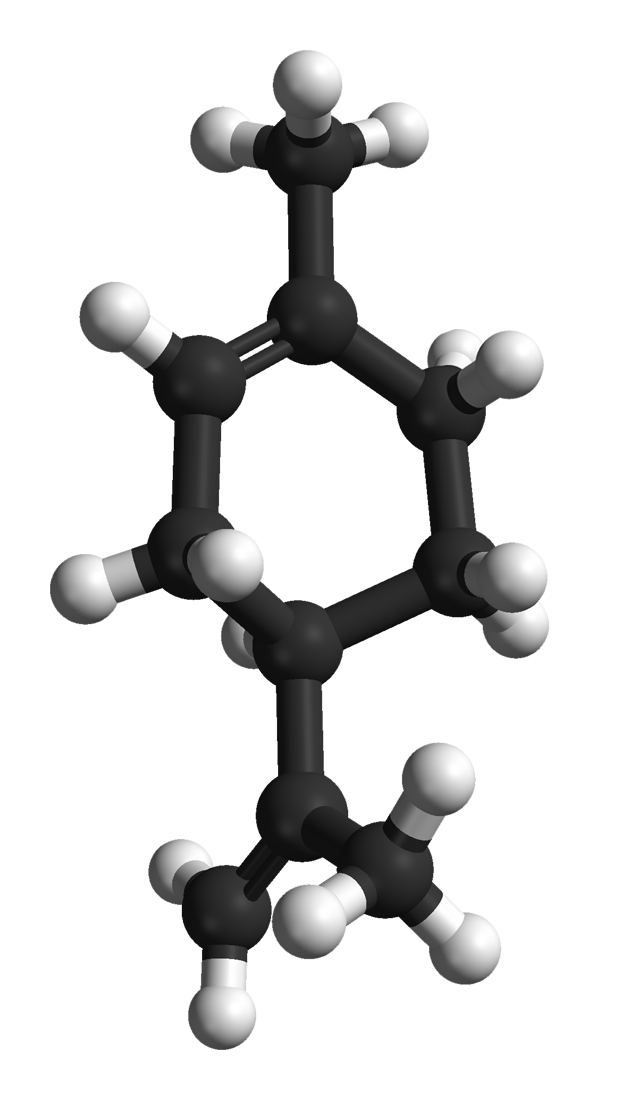
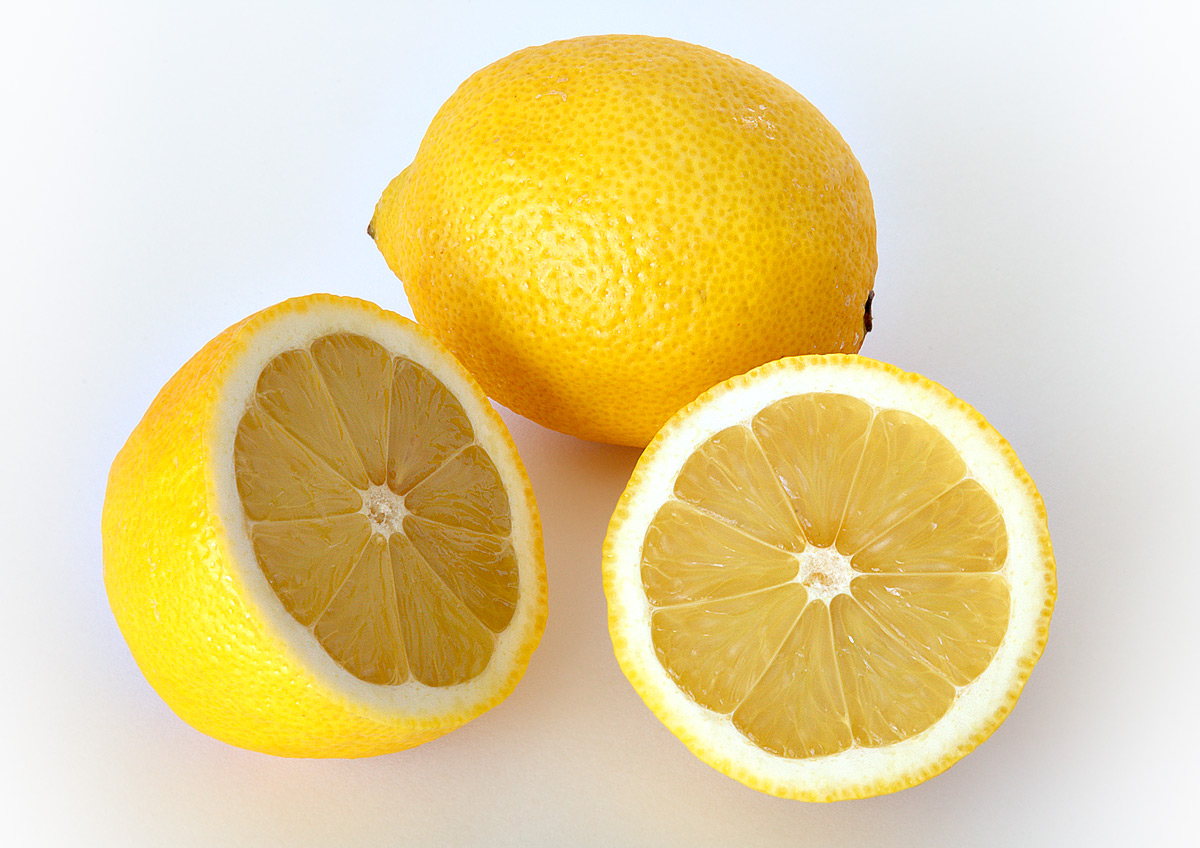
Limonene (left), an organic compound found in citrus fruits such as the lemon (right), is often the dominant terpene found in the Super Lemon Haze strain.

Super Lemon Haze typically exhibits several terpenes, which are organic compounds that are produced by many plants, including cannabis. The most common dominant terpenes found in this strain are limonene, which is also found in citrus fruits such as lemons, and terpinolene. Terpenes present at lower levels may include beta-caryophyllene, ocimene, and myrcene, depending on the plant’s genotype.

The tetrahydrocannabinol (THC) content ranges from 15 to 20%, with some phenotypes testing as high as 25%. This strain also exhibits lower levels of other minor cannabinoids, with approximately 1-2% of cannabinol (CBN), which can be traced to its Super Silver Haze lineage, and less than 1% of CBD content. Green House has also developed a high-cannabidiol (CBD) version by breeding it with a high-CBD male plant. Current Super Lemon Haze genetics range up to levels of 25% THC, 2% CBN and 1% CBD making this strain ideal for treating certain conditions like pain and depression.

It is said that the mood-elevating properties of Super Lemon Haze can help regulate mood disorders, such as depression, while also helping with other conditions such as minor pains, nausea, and appetite loss. The effects can be described as uplifting, energetic, creative, and cerebral.

== Awards ==
Super Lemon Haze has been recognized in the following cannabis competitions:

- 1st place High Times Cannabis Cup Amsterdam 2008
- 1st place High Times Cannabis Cup Amsterdam 2009
- 1st place IC420 Growers Cup Amsterdam 2010
- 2nd place High Times Cannabis Cup Amsterdam 2010
- 1st place High Times Medical Cup Seattle 2012
- 2nd place ExpoGrow Irun 2012
- 1st place ExpoGrow Irun 2013
- 1st place high times cannabis cup sativa Massachusetts 2021
