= Stony Awards =

Awards recognizing notable stoner films and television shows

The Stony Awards (a.k.a. the Stonys) recognize and celebrate notable stoner films and television. Created by High Times magazine in 2000, six Stony Award ceremonies were held in New York City before the Stonys moved to Los Angeles in 2007. Stony Award winners received a bong-shaped trophy.

== Locations and hosts ==
- 2000 - Anthology Film Archives in New York City; hosted by Upright Citizens Brigade
- 2001 - Anthology Film Archives in New York City; hosted by Brian McCann
- 2002 - March 3 at B.B. King's Blues Club & Grill in New York; hosted by Jim Breuer
- 2003 - B.B. King's Blues Club & Grill; hosted by Pauly Shore
- 2005 - September 28 at Spirit Nightclub; hosted by Tony Camin
- 2006 - October 24 at BB King's in New York City; co-hosted by Redman and Doug Benson
- 2007 - October 13 at The Knitting Factory in Hollywood; hosted by Tommy Chong
- 2008 - September 27 at Malibu Inn; hosted by Natasha "Vaporella" Lewin
- 2010 - September 30 at the Music Box; hosted by Cheech & Chong

== List of winners ==
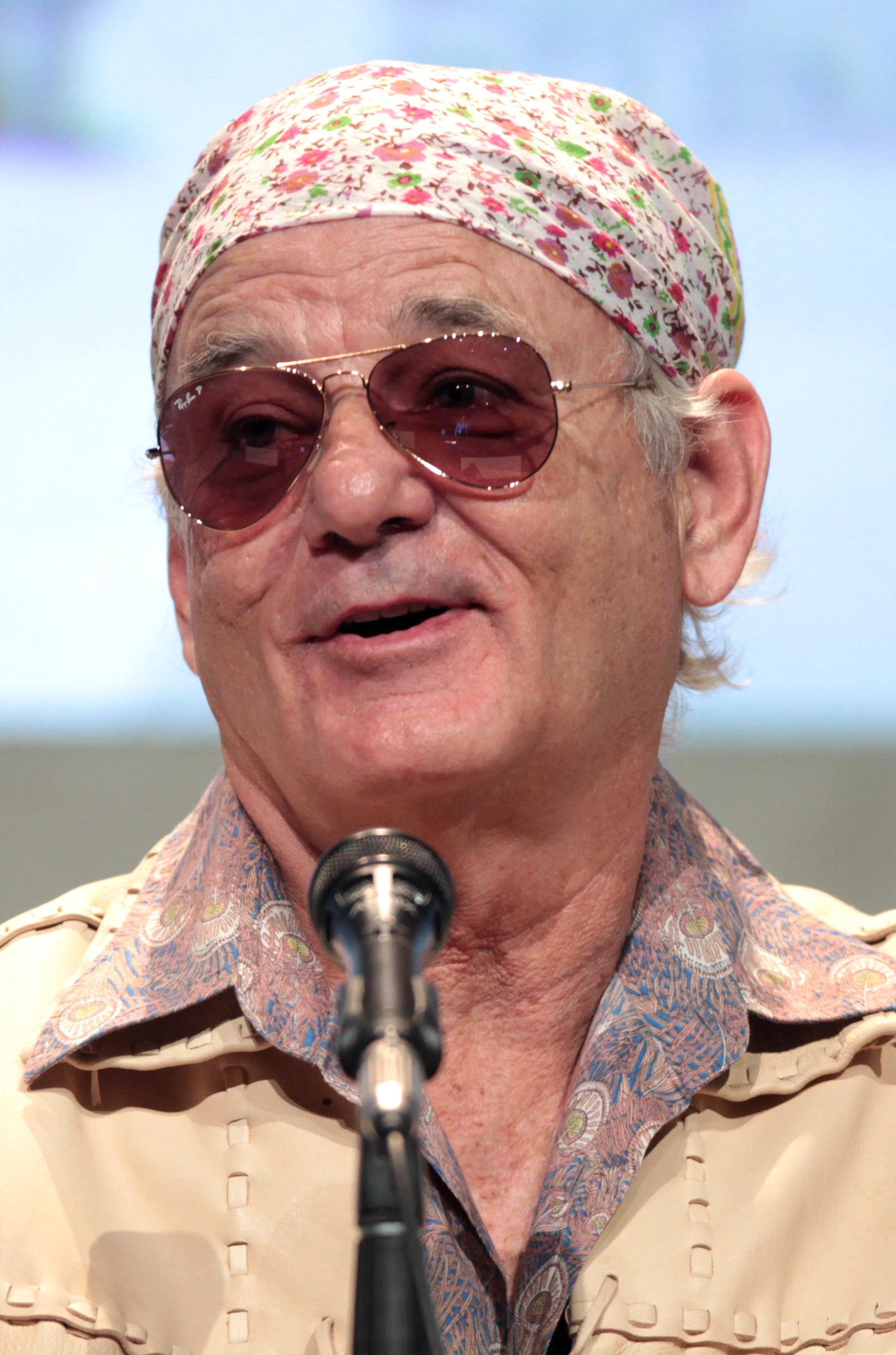
2005 Stoner of the Year and Best Actor winner Bill Murray

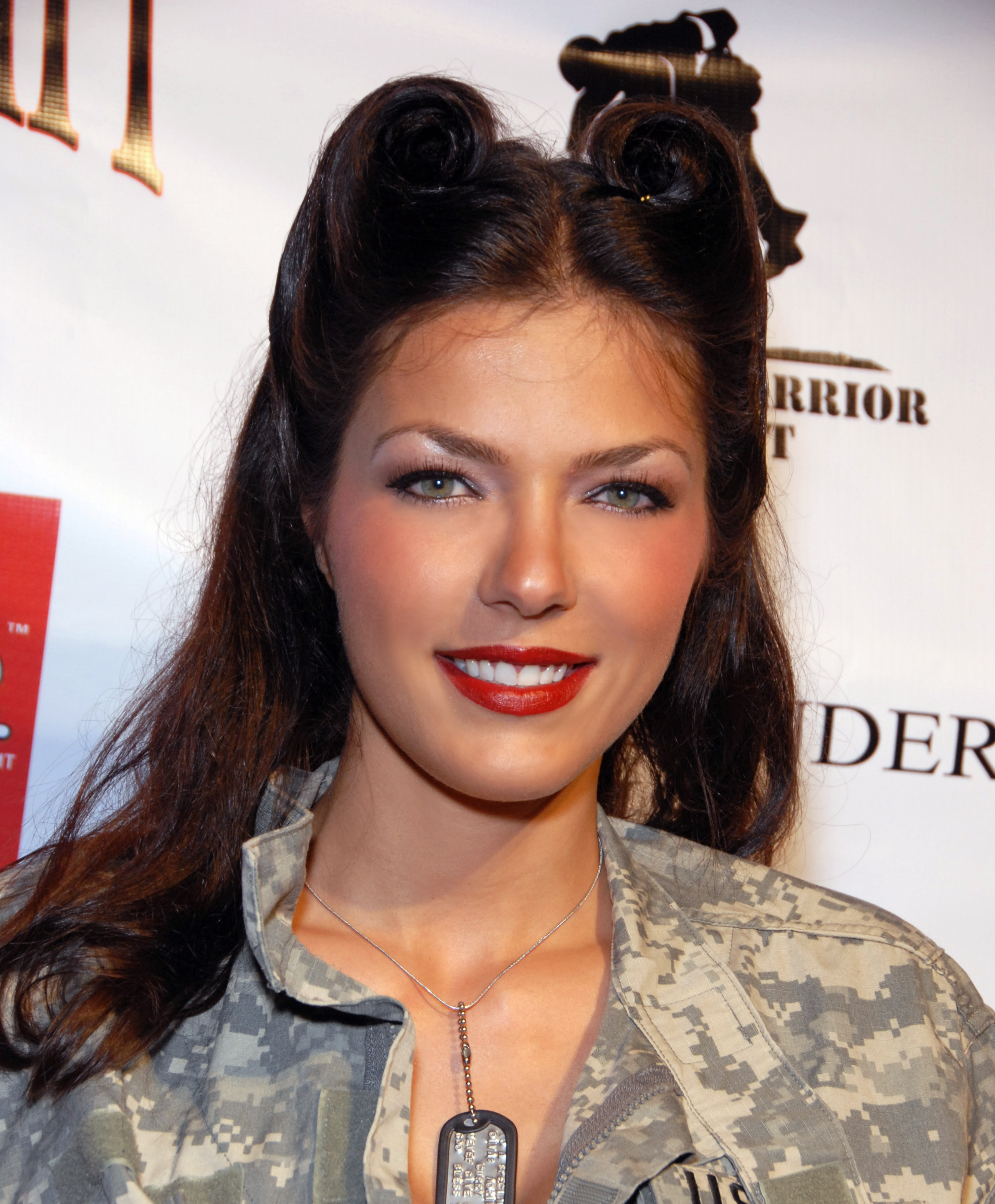
2005 Best Top Model winner Adrianne Curry

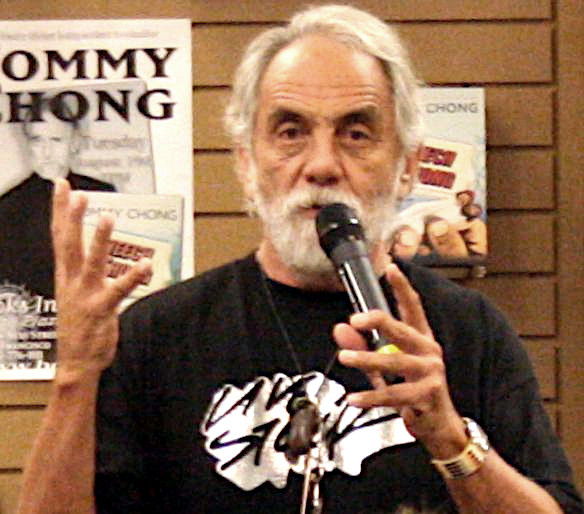
2006 Top Pot Comic winner Tommy Chong

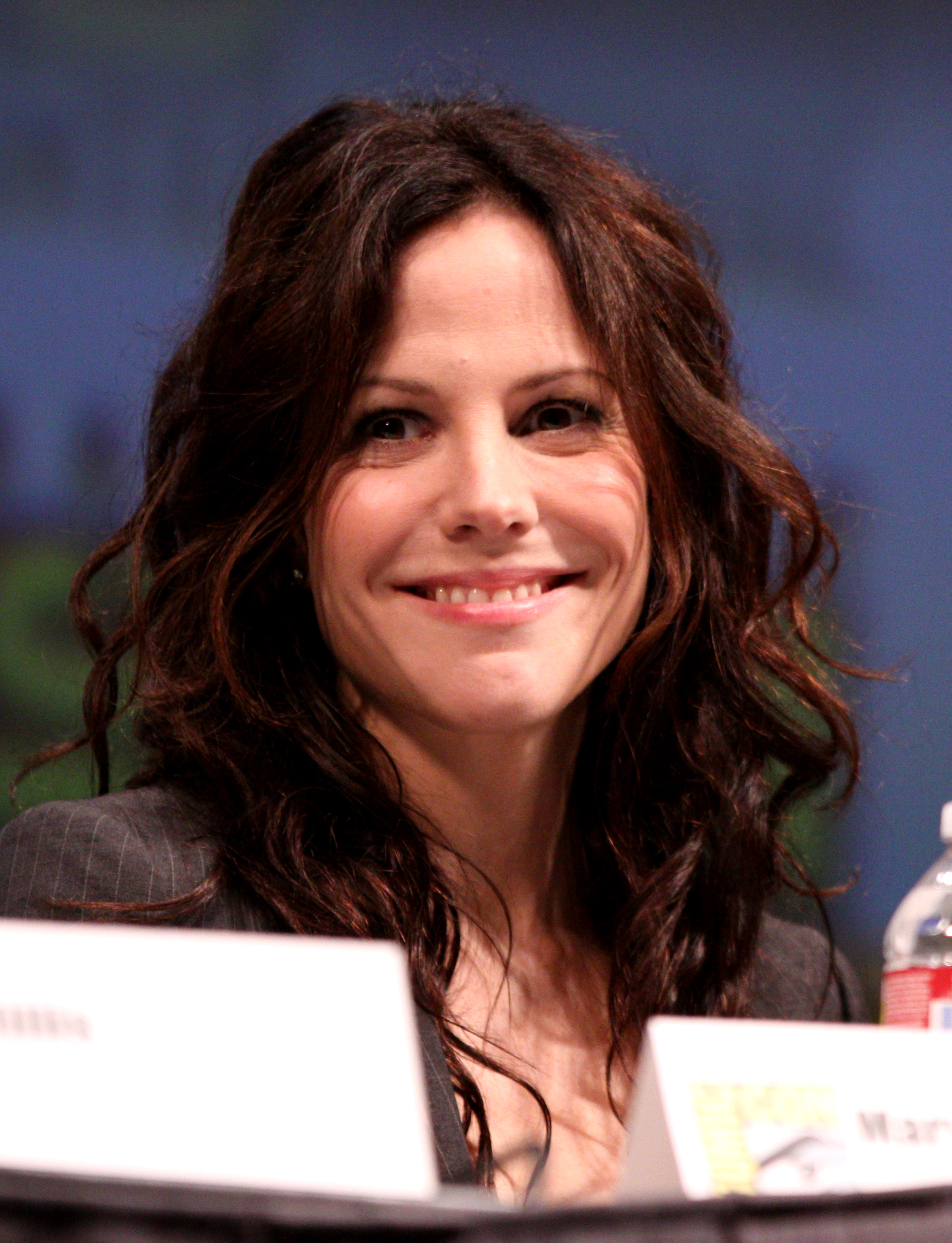
2006 Best Actress in a TV Series and 2007 Best Actress winner Mary-Louise Parker

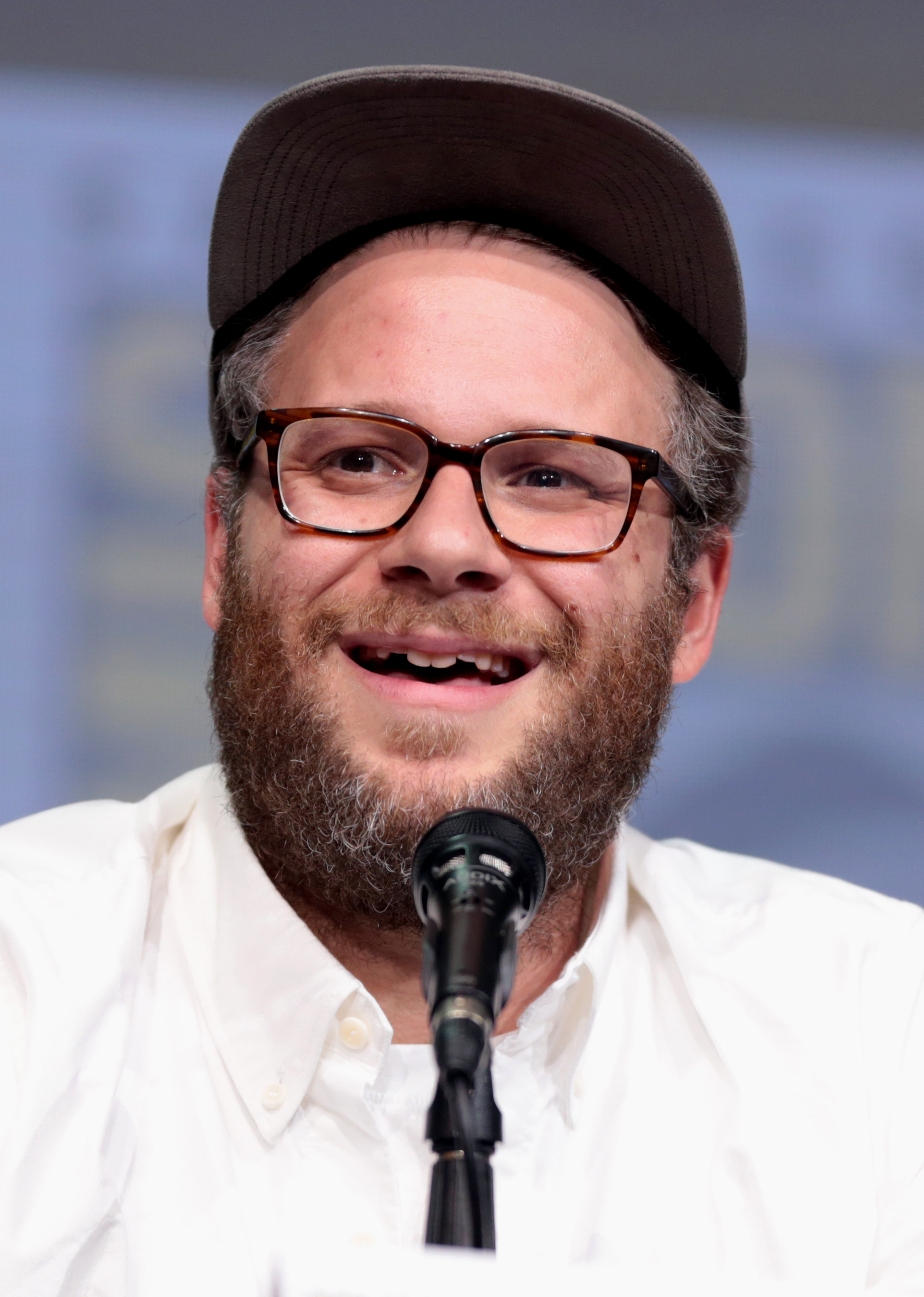
2007 Stoner of the Year winner Seth Rogen

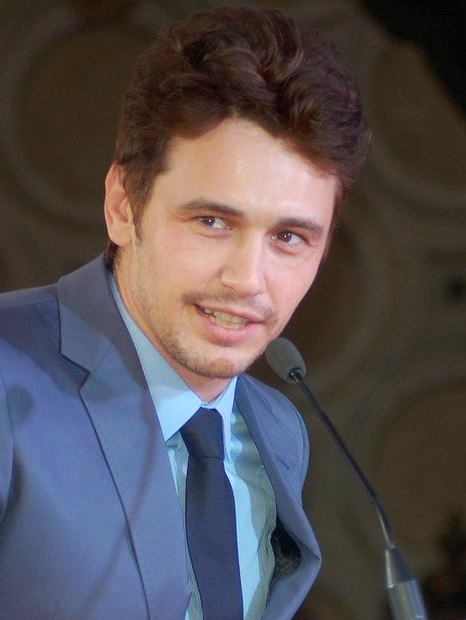
2008 Stoner of the Year winner James Franco

Year	Category	Winner
2000	Best Movie	Go
2000	Best Stoner Movie	Being John Malkovich
2000	Best Actress	Sarah Polley
2000	Best Actor, Comedy	Jason Mewes
2000	Best Actor, Drama	Kevin Spacey
2000	Best Director	Doug Liman
2000	Best Pot Scene	Dick
2000	Best Tripping Scene	Go
2000	Best Documentary	The Source
2000	Best Re-Release	Yellow Submarine
2000	Best Theatrical Production	Reefer Madness: The Musical
2000	Lifetime Achievement Award	Dennis Hopper
2001	Best Movie	Traffic
2001	Best Stoner Movie	Road Trip
2001	Lifetime Achievement Award	Cheech & Chong
2001	Best Pot Scene	Scary Movie
2001	Best Documentary	Grass
2001	Best Actor	Michael Douglas
2001	Best Actress	Kate Hudson
2001	Best Soundtrack Album	Grass
2001	Stoner of the Year	Ari Gold
2002	Best Movie	Blow
2002	Best Stoner Movie	How High
2002	Best Documentary	Grateful Dawg
2002	Best Actor	Ethan Hawke (Tape)
2002	Best Actress	Bijou Phillips (Bully)
2002	Best Soundtrack	The Wash (Dr. Dre)
2002	Best Foreign Film	Together
2002	Best Psychedelic Scene	Bully
2002	Best Pot Scene	Scary Movie 2
2002	Best Original Song in a Movie	"Lion Heart" by The Roots, from Brooklyn Babylon
2002	Thomas King Forçade Award	Francis Ford Coppola (Apocalypse Now)
2002	Stoner of the Year	Snoop Dogg
2003	Best Movie	Harvard Man
2003	Best Stoner Movie	Super Troopers
2003	Best Foreign Film	Talk to Her
2003	Best Music DVD	Rising Low
2003	Best Cultural Documentary	Ram Dass Fierce Grace
2003	Best Political Documentary	The Trials of Henry Kissinger
2003	Best Unreleased Movie	You'll Never Wiez in This Town Again
2003	Best Television Series	The Simpsons
2003	Best Actor	Philip Seymour Hoffman
2003	Best Actress	Goldie Hawn, Susan Sarandon
2003	Stoner of the Year	Horatio Sanz
2003	Thomas King Forçade Award	Frank Serpico
2005	Best Movie	Lords of Dogtown
2005	Best Stoner Movie	Harold & Kumar Go to White Castle
2005	Best Actor	Bill Murray (The Life Aquatic with Steve Zissou)
2005	Best Actress	Sissy Spacek (A Home at the End of the World)
2005	Best Pot Scene	Harold & Kumar Go to White Castle
2005	Best Documentary	The War on the War on Drugs
2005	Best Soundtrack	Harold & Kumar Go to White Castle
2005	Best TV Show	Chappelle's Show
2005	Best HBO Show	Da Ali G Show
2005	Best Animated TV Show	Family Guy
2005	Best Reality TV Show	Fear Factor
2005	Best Made-For-TV Movie	Reefer Madness: The Movie Musical
2005	Best Reality Show Host	Joe Rogan
2005	Best Queer Eye	Ted Allen
2005	Best Top Model	Adrianne Curry
2005	Best Stoner DVD	Bill Hicks Live: Satirist, Social Critic, Stand Up Comedian
2005	Best Music DVD	Hallucino-Genetics by Primus
2005	Best Unreleased Film	The Crop
2005	Stony Preservation Award	The Passenger
2005	Stoner of the Year	Bill Murray
2006	Best Movie (Drama)	A Scanner Darkly
2006	Best Stoner Movie	Grandma's Boy
2006	Best TV Series	Weeds
2006	Best Cable News Show	Real Time with Bill Maher
2006	Best Late-Night Talk Show	Late Night with Conan O'Brien
2006	Best Reality TV Series	My Fair Brady
2006	Best Actor in a Movie	Allen Covert (Grandma's Boy)
2006	Best Actress in a Movie	Jennifer Aniston (Friends with Money)
2006	Best Actor in a TV Series	Justin Kirk (Weeds)
2006	Best Actress in a TV Series	Mary-Louise Parker (Weeds)
2006	Best Pot Scene in a Movie	Grandma's Boy
2006	Best Documentary	a/k/a Tommy Chong
2006	Best Foreign Film	Stoned (England)
2006	Best Soundtrack	Dave Chappelle's Block Party
2006	Best Song in a Movie or TV Series	"Lazy Sunday" (Andy Samberg and Chris Parnell) from Saturday Night Live
2006	Best TV Special	The Drug Years
2006	Best Unreleased Film	Wetlands Preserved
2006	Best Stoner DVD	Dreadheads
2006	Top Pot Comic	Tommy Chong
2006	Best Play	The Marijuana-Logues
2006	Thomas King Forçade Award	Jeff "The Dude" Dowd
2006	Stoner of the Year	Doug Benson
2007	Best Stoner Film	Tenacious D in The Pick of Destiny
2007	Best Pot Comedy	Knocked Up
2007	Best Documentary	Standing Silent Nation
2007	Best Foreign Film	Trailer Park Boys: The Movie
2007	Best TV Show	Entourage
2007	Best Actor	James Gandolfini
2007	Best Actress	Mary-Louise Parker
2007	Best Stoner Video Game	Guitar Hero II
2007	Stoner of the Year	Seth Rogen
2007	Stonette of the Year	Anna Faris
2008	Best Comedy Film	Pineapple Express
2008	Best Drama	The Wackness
2008	Best Documentary	Super High Me
2008	Best TV Show	Weeds
2008	Best TV Special	Attack of the Show!: "420 Special"
2008	Best Web Video	Stonervention
2008	Stoner of the Year	James Franco (Pineapple Express)
2008	Stonette of the Year	Danneel Harris (Harold & Kumar Escape from Guantanamo Bay)
2009	Stoner of the Year	Brian Griffin (Family Guy)
2009	Stonette of the Year	Kristen Stewart (Adventureland)
2010	Stoner of the Year	John Cusack (Hot Tub Time Machine)
2010	Stonette of the Year	Drew Barrymore (Going the Distance)
2010	Best Animation	The Boondocks
2010	Best Documentary	Cheech & Chong's Hey Watch This
2010	Best Drama	Holy Rollers
2010	Best TV Show	Breaking Bad
2010	Best Comedy	Hot Tub Time Machine
2010	Internet Video Award	Jamie's World: Debunking Rumours about Mary Jane
2012	Stoner of the Year	Snoop Dogg

== High Times Guide to Stoner Film History ==
Reefer Madness (1936); Fantasia (1940); Hi De Ho (1947); High School Confidential (1958); A Hard Day's Night (1964); Help! (1965); Blowup (1966); The Trip (1967); I Love You, Alice B. Toklas, Yellow Submarine (1968); Easy Rider (1969); The Harder They Come (1972); Serpico (1973); Shampoo (1975); Annie Hall (1977); Up In Smoke, Rockers (1978); Apocalypse Now (1979); Where the Buffalo Roam (1980); Nice Dreams (1981); Fast Times at Ridgemont High (1982); Still Smokin' (1983); Cheech & Chong's The Corsican Brothers (1984); That Was Then... This Is Now (1985); Platoon (1986); Born in East L.A. (1987); 1969 (1988); Bill & Ted's Excellent Adventure (1989); Far Out Man (1990); The Doors (1991); Wayne's World (1992); Dazed and Confused (1993); Clerks, The Stoned Age (1994); Friday, Mallrats (1995); Beavis and Butt-Head Do America (1996); Bongwater (1997); The Big Lebowski, Half Baked (1998); Detroit Rock City, Idle Hands, American Beauty (1999); Dude, Where's My Car?; Next Friday, Scary Movie (2000); Super Troopers, How High, Scary Movie 2 (2001); Laurel Canyon (2002); Rolling Kansas (2003); Harold & Kumar Go to White Castle (2004); Lords of Dogtown (2005); Grandma's Boy; Puff, Puff, Pass (2006); Knocked Up, Tenacious D in the Pick of Destiny (2007); Harold & Kumar Escape from Guantanamo Bay, Pineapple Express (2008)

== Thomas King Forçade Award ==
Named after High Times founder Tom Forçade, the special award is for "stony achievement" in film.

- 2002: Francis Ford Coppola for Apocalypse Now
- 2003: Frank Serpico for Serpico
- 2006: Jeff "The Dude" Dowd for The Big Lebowski

== See also ==
- List of cannabis competitions
- List of films containing frequent marijuana use
