= DNA Genetics =

Cannabis company

- Company type: Privately held company
- Industry: Cannabis
- Founded: 2004; 21 years ago in Amsterdam
- Founders: Don Morris and Aaron Yarkoni
- Headquarters: Amsterdam, Netherlands
- Area served: Europe and North America
- Key people: Rezwan Khan (president), Don Morris and Aaron Yarkoni (co-CEOs)
- Products: Cannabis seeds
- Number of employees: 5 (2025)
- Website: dnagenetics.com

DNA Genetics is a Dutch cannabis company that cross breeds different strains of the cannabis plant. It was founded by Don Morris and Aaron Yarkoni ("D" and "A").

The company also sells merchandise, apparel, and accessories. Morris and Yarkoni also work as consultants for other professionals in the industry.

== History ==
In 2004, Don Morris and Aaron Yarkoni officially founded DNA Genetics in Amsterdam, where they could legally and commercially produce cannabis after bringing their Californian hybrid strains of cannabis seeds to the Netherlands. In 2015, DNA partnered with Tweed, a subsidiary of Canopy Growth Corporation, to introduce cannabis in Canada. DNA renewed its partnership with Canopy Growth in 2017 to introduce DNA's original strains to Jamaica and other Caribbean markets.

In 2019, DNA Genetics entered into an agreement with Good Meds to bring DNA's strains to Colorado. DNA Genetics and Canopy Growth Corporation have a partnership agreement that brings their products to Canada, Jamaica, and a European market. That same year, the company teamed up with 1933 Industries' subsidiary, Alternative Medicine Association, in a licensing agreement and strategic alliance, to bring their cannabis products to Nevada. Additionally, DNA Genetics signed a licensing agreement with Copperstate Farms LLC to cultivate, manufacture, sell and distribute their products in Arizona. In August 2019, DNA acquired Crockett Family Farms, a family-owned cannabis farm, with David Suderman of Crockett serving as Vice President of Cannabis Operations. The farm's strain Tangie has won over 20 awards, including the Cannabis Cup. Crockett and DNA also sharing a consulting company.

In September 2019, it was announced that DNA Genetics signed a licensing agreement with Revolutionary Clinics, a Massachusetts-based cannabis producer and distributor. In December, the company entered a strategic partnership with Halo Labs, which will be the only grower and manufacturer of DNA Genetics' products in Oregon. That same month, the company partnered with Green Peak Innovations. In January 2020, the company partnered with Bophelo Bioscience & Wellness.

== Recognition ==
DNA Genetics has received over 200 awards won in over 20 years. Some of these awards include the High Times Cannabis Cup, which the company has won 14 times, as well as Best Seed Company by online votes at the Happy Place festival. DNA Genetics has also received the High Times Trailer Blazers award, which they received at the world's first Cannabis Business Summit, and listed on both the High Times "Top 10 Strains of the Year" and the High Times 100 list of most influential people in the cannabis industry.
