= Josh Gilbert =

Josh Gilbert may refer to:

- Josh Gilbert (filmmaker) (1962–2016), American screenwriter and documentary filmmaker
- Josh Gilbert (musician) (born 1987), American bassist, singer, songwriter, and producer
- Joshua Gilbert (cricketer) (born 1993), Bermudian cricketer
- Joshua Gilbert (swimmer), New Zealand swimmer
