= Cannabis Cup =

Annual Festival in Amsterdam

- Poster art for the 22nd High Times Cannabis Cup, 2009 By Steve Marcus
- Date: November 1988
- Frequency: Annually
- Location: Amsterdam
- Country: Netherlands; United States
- Inaugurated: 1988
- Founder: Steve Hager
- Most recent: 2014
- Sponsor: High Times
- Website: www.cannabiscup.com

The High Times Cannabis Cup is a cannabis festival sponsored by High Times magazine. The event features judges from around the world who sample and vote for their favorite marijuana varieties, with cups (trophies) being awarded to the overall winner in the cannabis variety competition. Since 1997, the Cannabis Cup festival has hosted induction ceremonies for the Counterculture Hall of Fame.

Founded in 1988 by High Times editor Steven Hager, the Cannabis Cup is usually held each November in Amsterdam. The first U.S. Cannabis Cup was held in 1995 by Rob Robinson and Damn Sam Productions; High Times now holds Cannabis Cups in Northern and Southern California, Denver, Michigan, Seattle, Missouri, and Oregon . The High Times Medical Cannabis Cup recognizes medical marijuana in states that have passed medical marijuana laws.

The High Times Cannabis Cup also includes live music, educational seminars, and an expo for marijuana-related products from cannabis-oriented businesses.

== History ==
A DVD called High Times Presents: The Cannabis Cup was made after the 2003 festival.

The 20th High Times Cannabis Cup, held in 2007, featured hosts Tommy Chong and Redman; a film of the 2007 festival was released in the summer of 2008.

In 2010, Dutch police raided the Amsterdam Cannabis Cup location. That same year, High Times mounted its first Cannabis Cup in the United States, also inaugurating the High Times Medical Cannabis Cup, an annual event celebrating medical cannabis. The first Medical Cannabis Cup took place in San Francisco, California, on June 19–20, 2010.

In 2014, after 27 years, Amsterdam held what appeared to be its final High Times Cannabis Cup. This decision was partly due to the growing uncertainty about Dutch cannabis laws, the newly available legal cannabis locations in the United States and various other countries, and the after-effects of the 2010 raid. (The Cannabis Cup later returned to Amsterdam.)

In 2017, the festival celebrated its 30th anniversary, with the award show hosted by Danny Danko.

In 2018, the festival was held in the middle of summer, on 13th to 15 July, veering away from its usual schedule.

== Categories ==
Award categories include Best New Product, Best Booth, Best Glass, Best Hash, and Best Nederhash (hashish that is produced only in the Netherlands). A team of VIP judges decides which seed company has grown the Best Indica, Best Sativa, and Best Hybrid Strain, and which company has produced the Best Nederhash and Best Imported Hash.

The U.S. Cannabis Cup recognizes marijuana in states that have passed laws that legalize marijuana for adult, recreational use. Teams of expert judges vote on Best Indica, Best Sativa, Best Hybrid, Best Concentrates, Best Edibles, and Highest Level of CBD in cannabis products (All cannabis products are tested for THC content and CBD content by independent cannabis-testing laboratories). At each U.S. Cannabis Cup expo, festival attendees vote for Best Booth, Best Products, and Best Glass.

== Counterculture Hall of Fame ==
The Counterculture Hall of Fame celebrates the history of the counterculture and the people who helped shape it. Previous inductees include Bob Marley (1997), Louis Armstrong (1998), William S. Burroughs, Allen Ginsberg, and Jack Kerouac (1999), Bob Dylan (2002), Jack Herer (2003), Tommy Chong and Cheech Marin (2007), Peter Tosh (2008) Tom Forcade (2009) and Coke La Rock (2010). John Griggs, BEL (2011), Steven Hager (2012), Ben Dronkers (2013), and Alexander Shulgin & Ann Shulgin (2014).

== Past winners ==
=== Overall Cannabis Cup ===
1. 1st Cup 1988 — Skunk #1 from Cultivator's Choice
2. 2nd Cup 1989 — Early Pearl/Skunk #1 x Northern Lights #5/Haze from the Seed Bank
3. 3rd Cup 1990 — Northern Lights #5 from the Seed Bank
4. 4th Cup 1991 — Skunk from Free City
5. 5th Cup 1992:
  1. Haze x Skunk #1 from Homegrown Fantasy
  2. Master Kush Winner— Hindu Kush X Skunk #1
6. 6th Cup 1993:
  1. Haze x Northern Lights #5 from Sensi Seed Bank
  2. Master Kush Winner — Hindu Kush X Skunk #1
7. 7th Cup 1994 — Jack Herer from Sensi Seed Bank
8. 8th Cup 1995 — White Widow from the Green House
9. 9th Cup 1996 — White Russian from De Dampkring
10. 10th Cup 1997 — Peace Maker from De Dampkring
11. 11th Cup 1998 — Super Silver Haze from the Green House
12. 12th Cup 1999 — Super Silver Haze from the Green House
13. 13th Cup 2000 — Blueberry from the Noon
14. 14th Cup 2001 — Sweet Tooth from Barney's
15. 15th Cup 2002 — Morning Glory from Barney's
16. 16th Cup 2003 — Hawaiian Snow from Green House
17. 17th Cup 2004 — Amnesia Haze from Barney's
18. 18th Cup 2005 — Willie Nelson from Barney's
19. 19th Cup 2006 — Arjan's Ultra Haze #1 from Green House
20. 20th Cup 2007 — G-13 Haze from Barney's
21. 21st Cup 2008 — Super Lemon Haze from Green House United
22. 22nd Cup 2009 — Super Lemon Haze from Green House United
23. 23rd Cup 2010 — Tangerine Dream from Barney's
24. 24th Cup 2011 — Liberty Haze from Barney's
25. 25th Cup 2012 — Flower Bomb Kush from the Green House
26. 26th Cup 2013 — Rollex OG Kush from The Green Place
27. 27th Cup 2014 — MaraDawg Blue Flake Cheese Pearl from Chopper Special

=== 17th Cup (2004) winners ===
Overall Cannabis Cup

1. Amnesia Haze by Barney's Breakfast Bar
2. Killer Green by Katsu
3. Jack Flash by Sensi Seeds

Indica Cup

1. God Bud by BC Bud Depot
2. MK Ultra by TH Seeds
3. L.A. Confidential by DNA Genetics

Sativa Cup

1. Love Potion No. 1 by Reeferman Seeds
2. Arjan's Haze No. 1 by Green House Seeds
3. Sage 'N Sour by TH Seeds

Import Hash Cup

1. Caramella Cream by Barney's Breakfast Bar
2. Royal Cream Gold by Rokerij
3. Nepal Pollen Shoe by Green House Seeds

=== 18th Cup (2005) winners ===
Overall Cannabis Cup

1. Willie Nelson by Barney's
2. Arjan's Schoenmaker Zwevers Ultra Haze 2 by Green House
3. Silver Haze by Coffeeshop Dampkring

Indica Cup (Seed Company)

1. Lavender by Soma Seeds
2. LA Confidential by DNA
3. Sensi Star by Paradise Seeds

Sativa Cup (Seed Company)

1. Martian Mean Green by DNA
2. Nebula by Paradise Seeds
3. Kushage by THSeeds
4. Romulan by Meekseeds

Import Hash Cup

1. Caramella Cream by Barney's
2. Rifman Malika by De Dampkring
3. King Hassan by Green House

Nederhash Cup

1. Waterworks by De Dampkring
2. Kadni Bubble by Barney's
3. Arjan's Ultra 2 Haze Hash by Green House

Glass Cup

1. Triple Perculator by Green Devil
2. D-Line by DNA
3. Opal Smooth by ROOR Glass

Product Award

1. Vapezilla by Wicked Roots
2. Pollinator by Bubblator
3. Mini Matches by De Dampkrin
4. Phil Lesh Kadeshhh by Golden Bud of Unlimited Tokevotion

=== 19th Cup (2006) winners ===
Cannabis Cup

1. Arjan's Ultra Haze #1 – Green House
2. G13 Haze – Barney's
3. Martian Mean Green – Grey Area

Sativa Cup

1. Mako Haze – Kiwiseeds
2. Opium – Paradise Seeds
3. Blue Cheese – Big Buddha Seeds

Indica

1. Big Buddha Cheese – Big Buddha Seeds
2. Fruity Thai – Ceres Seeds
3. Night Shade – Barney's

Hash

1. Sexpot Holland- Netherlands, Holland Home Brew
2. Carmello Cream – Barney's
3. Carmello Royale – Green House
4. Rifman's Noor – De Dampkring

Nederhash

1. Barney Rubble – Barney's
2. Water Works – De Dampkring
3. Master Kush Isolater – Green House

Product

1. Super Vapezilla – Wicked Roots
2. Portable Vortex Gravity Bong – Gravity Vortex
3. Aleda Papers – Aleda

Expo

1. Barney's Farm
2. Green House
3. Wicked Roots

=== 20th Cup (2007) winners ===
Cannabis Cup

1. G-13 Haze – Barney's
2. Chocolope – Grey Area
3. Super Silver Haze – Green House United

Indica Cup

1. Top Dog – Amnesia Seeds
2. Crimea Blue – Barney's Farm
3. Reserva Privada #18 – Reserva Privada

Sativa Cup

1. Kaia Kush – Apothecary
2. Tasman Haze – Kiwi Seeds
3. The Purps – BC Bud Depot

Neder Hash

1. Violator Ice-o-lator – Barney's
2. Bubble Mania – Green House United
3. Grey Crystals – Grey Area

Import Hash

1. Triple X – Barney's
2. King Hassan Supreme – Green House United
3. Rifman's Habibi – De Dampkring

Product Cup

1. Barney's Gift Bag – Barney's
2. Portable Vortex Gravity Bong – Gravity Vortex
3. Vaporstar Vaporizer by Vaporstar

Best Booth

1. Barney's Farm
2. DNA Seeds
3. Green House Seeds

=== 21st Cup (2008) winners ===
Cannabis Cup

1. Super Lemon Haze – Greenhouse United
2. Utopia Haze – Barney's
3. Chocolope – The Green Place

Indica Cup

1. Mt. Cook – Kiwi Seeds
2. Cheese – Homegrown Fantaseeds
3. LSD – Amnesia Seeds

Sativa Cup

1. Utopia Haze – Barney's
2. DeLaHaze – Paradise
3. Cannatonic – Resin Seeds

Neder Hash

1. Royal Jelly – Barney's
2. Greenhouse Ice – Greenhouse
3. Grey Crystal – Grey Area

Import Hash

1. Triple Zero – Barney's
2. Super Palm – Greenhouse
3. Shiraz – Amnesia

Product Cup

(tie) 1. BC Chillum – Barney's
(tie) 1. Pocket Alchemy – DNA
2. Bubble Bags – Bubble Bags
3. Glass Vaporizer – Herborizer

Best Booth

1. Barney's

Glass Cup

1. AK – DNA Genetics
2. Mr Nice Custom – RooR
3. MOE – Green Devil

=== 22nd Cup (2009) winners ===
Cannabis Cup

1. Super Lemon Haze – Green House
2. Vanilla Kush – Barney's
3. Head Band Kush – The Green Place

Indica Cup

1. Starbud – Hortilab
2. OG18 – Reserva Privada
3. Kush D – AllStar Genetics

Sativa Cup

1. Super Lemon Haze – Green House
2. The Purps – BC Bud Depot

Neder Hash

1. Royal Jelly – Barney's
2. Greenhouse Ice – Green House
3. Grey Crystal – Grey Area

Import Hash

1. Rif Cream – Greenhouse
2. Triple Zero – Barney's
3. Azilla – Amnesia

Product Cup

1. Vapor Swing – Original Design by HMK
2. Incredibowl i420 – Incredibowl Industries
3. Strain Hunters DVD – Green House

Best Booth

1. Greenhouse Seed co
2. Barney Farm
3. Big Buddha Seeds

Glass Cup

1. RooR Excalibur
2. shattered dreams
3. Incredibowl i420 – Incredibowl Industries

=== 23rd Cup (2010) winners ===
Cannabis Cup

1. Tangerine Dream – Barney's Coffeeshop
2. Super Lemon Haze – Greenhouse United
3. L.A. Cheese – The Green Place

Indica Cup

1. Kosher Kush – Reserva Privada
2. Cold Creek Kush – TH Seeds
3. White OG – Karma Genetics

Sativa Cup

1. Acapulco Gold – Amnesia Seeds
2. Chocolope – DNA Genetics
3. Sour Power – Hortilab

Neder Hash

1. Tangerine Nectar Ice-O-Lator – Greenhouse
2. Tangerine Nectar Iceolator- Barney's
3. Grey Area Crystal – Grey Area

Import Hash

1. Caramella Cream- Barney's Coffeeshop
2. Rif Cream – Greenhouse United
3. Twizla – The Green Place

Product Cup

1. Barney's Bud Scope – Barney's
2. Strainhunters India DVD – Greenhouse Seed Co.
3. NO_{2} Vaporizer- Vapir

Best Booth

1. Barney Farm
2. Greenhouse Seed Co.
3. Attitude Seed Bank

Glass Cup

1. Ghost – RooR
2. The Klingon – The Cali Connection
3. Dragon Bong – Dragon Bong & Earth Spirit

Freedom Fighter of the Year

=== 24th Cup (2011) winners ===
Cannabis Cup

1. Liberty Haze – Barney's Coffeeshop
2. Hawaiian Snow – Greenhouse United
3. Buddha Tahoe – The Green Place

Indica Cup

1. Kosher Kush – Reserva Privada
2. Star Bud – Hortilab
3. Tahoe OG – Cali Connection

Sativa Cup

1. Moonshine Haze – Rare Dankness Seed co
2. Electric Lemon Haze – TH Seeds
3. Dominator – Karma Genetics

=== 25th Cup (2012) winners ===
Cannabis Cup

1. Flower Bomb Kush – the Green House Coffeeshop
2. Shoreline – the Green Place
3. Evergrey – the Grey Area

Indica Cup

1. Kosher Kush – Reserva Privada
2. True OG – Elemental Seeds
3. SFV OG Kush – Cali Connection

Sativa Cup

1. Amnesia Haze – Soma's Sacred Seeds
2. Sour Amnesia – Hortilab
3. Green Shack – Strain Hunters Seedbank

Hybrid

1. Loud Scout – Loud Seeds
2. Rock Star – Bonguru Seeds
3. Rug Burn OG – Rare Dankness Seedse

Neder Hash

1. Lemon Crystal – the Green House Coffeeshop
2. Grey Crystal – the Grey Area
3. M.O.G – the Green Place

Seed Company Hash

1. The Wheezy – Reserva Privada
2. Tangerine Compound – Rare Dankness Seeds
3. The Tangie – DNA Genetics

Import Hash

1. Sharkberry Cream – the Green House Coffeeshop
2. Twizzler – the Green Place
3. Maroc Lemon Haze – The Bushdocter

Product Cup

1. Big Buddha Seeds Goodie Bag – Big Buddha Seeds
2. PUFFiT Inhaler/Vaporizer – VapoShop and Discreet Vape
3. Tiny Sister – Roor

Best Booth

1. Big Buddha Seeds
2. Cali Connection
3. Roor

Glass Cup

1. Drill Bill – Roor Glass
2. Puk Pipe – Puk Pipe
3. The MF Doom Borch – DNA Genetics and Hitman Glass

CBD Award

1. Lion's Tabernacle – Cali Connection

Freedom Fighter of the Year

1. Mason Tvert

Dutch Master Honorees

1. Wernard Bruining and Nol van Schaik

=== 26th Cup (2013) winners ===
Cannabis Cup

1. Rollex OG Kush – the Green Place
2. Flowerbomb Kush – the Green House
3. Tangie – the Bushdoctor Coffeeshop

Indica Cup

1. Whitewalker OG – Gold Coast Extract
2. True OG – Elemental Seeds
3. KnightsBridge OG – Lady Sativa Genetics

Sativa Cup

1. Tangie – Reserva Privada
2. Sour Power – Hortilab
3. Headbangar- Karma Genetics

Hybrid

1. Somari – Soma's Sacred Seeds
2. Girl Scout Cookies – Tahoe Wellness Cooperatives
3. Dieseltonic – Resin Seeds

Neder Hash

1. Lemon Crystal – the Green House Coffeeshop
2. Shoreline Solventless – the Green Place
3. Tangie Wax – the Bushdoctor Coffeeshop

Seed Company Hash

1. Lemon Cleaner OG Nectar – TCLabs/TerpX/EmoTex
2. Whitewalker OG – Gold Coast Extracts
3. Chemblend Solventless Wax – Elemental Seeds/Essential Extracts/ Johnny Trill

Import Hash

1. Twizzla – the Green Place
2. Chemdog Cream- the Green House
3. Maroc Lemon Haze – The Bushdocter

Product Cup

1. Buddha Giftbag – Big Buddha Seeds
2. Cloud V – Cloud V
3. Sublimator – Sublimator

Best Booth

1. Big Buddha Seeds
2. Devil's Harvest
3. Sensi Seeds

Glass Cup

1. Master Yoda/Big Buddha Seeds – Honey Collabs Collection
2. Loud/Silka – Sika Glass
3. Ray Pack – Roor

CBD Award

1. Cannatonic- Elemental Seeds

Inductee High Times Hall of Fame

1. Ben Dronkers

=== 27th Cup (2014) winners ===
Cannabis Cup

Best Coffeeshop Flowers

1. Barney's Coffeeshop- Cookies Kush
2. Green Place – OG Reekn
3. The Green House – Pure Kush

Best Sativa by a Seed Company

1. Crockett Family Farms – Tangie Crockett's Cut
2. DNA Genetics – Tangie
3. PhenoFinders – Lemon Bubble

Best Indica by a Seed Company

1. The Vault Genetics – Colorado Bubba
2. True Canna Genetics – The Truth
3. DNA Genetics – Kosher Kush

Best Hybrid by a Seed Company

1. The Vault Genetics – Larry OG
2. Rare Dankness Seeds – Star Killer
3. BC Bud Depot – Night Nurse

Best Import Hash (Concentrates) by a Seed Company

1. Loud Pack Extractions & Greenwolf, Louisiana – Super Lemon OG Concentrate
2. Oasis Medical Seeds in Flint, Michigan – Paris OG Shatter Dab Vader
3. DNA Unlimited – Lemon OG 18 Live Resin

Best Neder Hash by a Coffeeshop

1. Barney's Coffeeshop – Cookies Ice-Cream
2. The Green House -Green House Ice
3. The Grey Area – Grey Crystan

Best Import Hash Coffeeshop

1. the Green House – Super Lemon Haze Cream
2. Barney's Coffeeshop – Carmella Cream
3. The Green Place – Twisla

Best Neder Hash by a Seed Company

1. The Vault Genetics – The Kong 73 Non-Solvent Hash
2. DNA Grow Your Own – Betty Ross
3. Drysift by House of the Great Gardener -Barb 99

CBD Flowers

House of the Great Gardener – CBD Rene

CBD Concentrate

1. CannaVest – CBD Simple

Best Product

1. The Loud Seeds Gift Bag
2. Devil's Harvest
3. Sensi Seeds

Best Glass

1. Roor
2. Flav421 History in the Making by the Dampkring Gallery
3. Team Japan Onigari/ Demon Hunter by the Dampkring Gallery

== Australian Cannabis Cup ==
The Australian Cannabis Cup is an annual cannabis competition held in Nimbin, New South Wales, Australia. It has been celebrated since before 1995 and is known for recognizing excellence in cannabis produce.

The event features judges from around Australia who sample and vote for their favourite cannabis varieties, with cups (trophies) being awarded to the overall winner in the cannabis variety competition and in the best wax, dabs and rosin categories.

=== History ===
The Australian Cannabis Cup gained national attention in 1995 when it was featured in a documentary by 60 Minutes. Over the years, the event has evolved, with a focus on two primary categories: buds/flowers and extracts like oils and hash. In recent years, Alec ‘Craze’ Zammitt and Will Stolk, members of the 420 cannabis protest group 'Who Are We Hurting?,' have documented the event through video coverage.

=== Categories ===
Award categories include Best Flower, Wax or Dab, Best Hash, (hashish that is produced only in Australia). A team of judges decides which grower has grown the Best Indica, Best Sativa, and Best Hash.

== See also ==
- List of cannabis competitions
