= Counterculture Hall of Fame =

Anti-establishment hall of fame

The Counterculture Hall of Fame, managed by High Times magazine, is a hall of fame primarily dedicated to celebrating the counterculture and the people who helped shape it. The hall was created in 1997 by High Times editor Steven Hager. Inductions were held annually on Thanksgiving as part of the Cannabis Cup event in Amsterdam.

A short documentary was typically shown to introduce the inductee(s) to the audience, and a silver Cannabis Cup was awarded to each inductee.

== Inductees ==
- 1997 Bob Marley
- 1998 Louis Armstrong, Mezz Mezzrow
- 1999 Jack Kerouac, Neal Cassady, Allen Ginsberg, William S. Burroughs
- 2000 Ina May Gaskin
- 2001 Paul Krassner
- 2002 Bob Dylan, Joan Baez
- 2003 Jack Herer
- 2004 Stephen Gaskin
- 2005 John Trudell
- 2006 Rainbow Family veterans Barry "Plunker" Adams and Garrick Beck
- 2007 Tommy Chong, Cheech Marin
- 2008 Peter Tosh
- 2009 Thomas King Forcade
- 2010 Coke La Rock
- 2011 The Brotherhood of Eternal Love founder John Griggs
- 2012 Steven Hager
- 2014 Sasha Shulgin and Ann Shulgin
- 2015 The Grateful Dead
