= Urbana High School (Illinois) =

Public high school in Urbana, Illinois

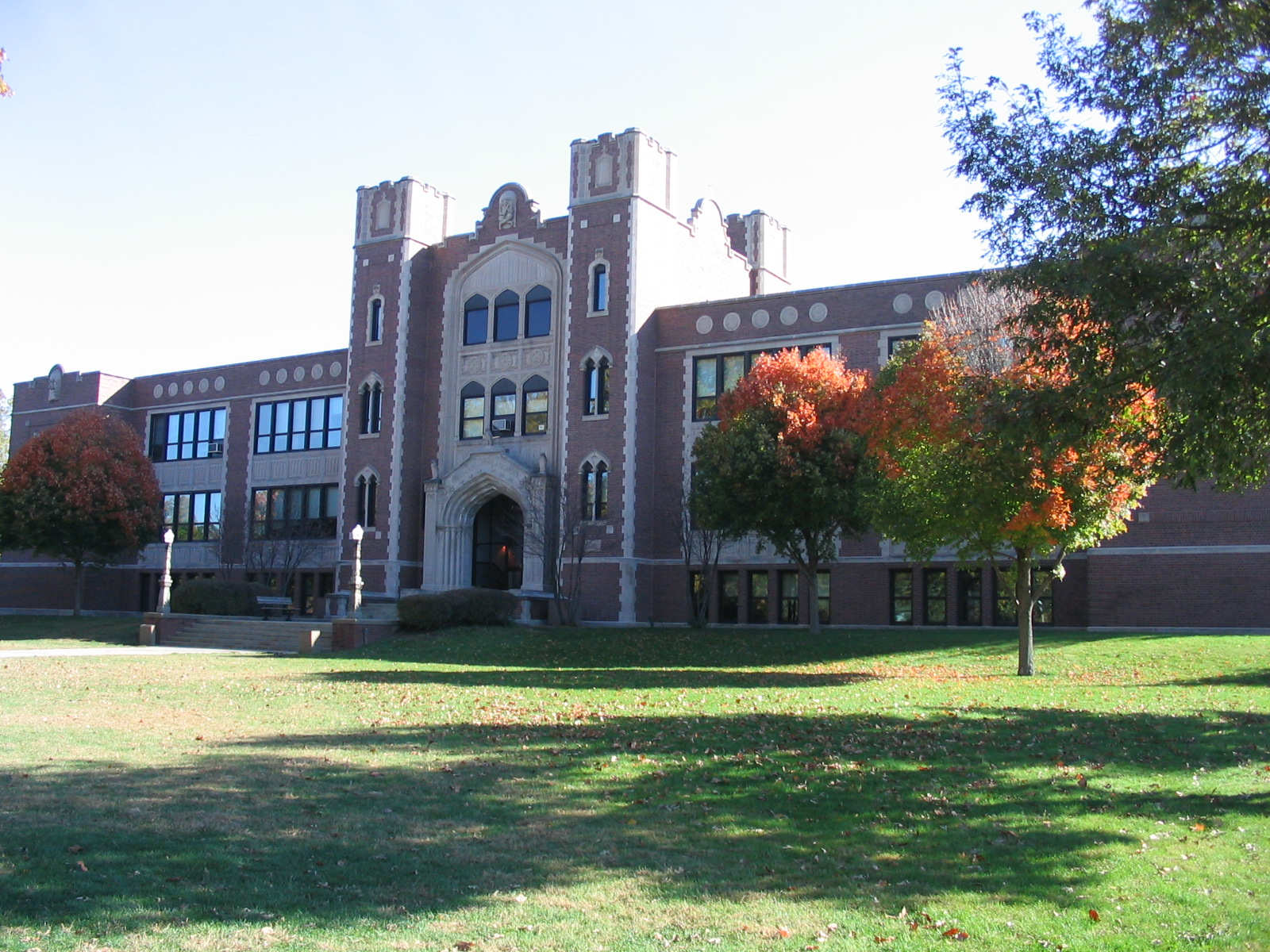

Location
- 1002 S. Race Street; Urbana, Champaign-Urbana, Illinois 61801; United States; 40°06′14″N 88°12′34″W

Information
- School type: Public, High School
- Established: 1872
- Status: Open
- School district: 116
- CEEB code: 144-185
- Principal: Jesse Guzman
- Teaching staff: 97.00 (FTE)
- Student to teacher ratio: 12.44
- Campus type: Urban
- Colors: Orange; Black
- Fight song: On Urbana!
- Athletics: IHSA
- Athletics conference: Big Twelve
- Sports: Baseball; basketball; cross country; football; golf; soccer; softball; swimming; tennis; track; volleyball; wrestling
- Mascot: Tiger
- Team name: Tigers / Lady Tigers
- Rival: Champaign Central High School; Champaign Centennial High School; Danville High School
- Publication: Loophole - UHS Literary Magazine
- Newspaper: Echo
- Yearbook: Rosemary
- Nobel laureates: Robert W. Holley, Edwin G. Krebs
- Website: Official website

Urbana High School is a public high school in Urbana, Illinois that was established in 1872.

== History ==
Urbana High School's current building was built in 1914. It was designed by architect Joseph Royer who also designed many other buildings in the area including the Urbana Free Library and the Champaign County Court House. The architecture of Urbana High School is of the Tudor style, defined primarily by the towers over the main entrance and the flattened point arches over the doors.

An addition was built in 1916 which included a gymnasium and swimming pool. Due to increasing enrollment, further additions were built in 1955 and 1965.

In 1988, an enclosed athletic area was added while the old gymnasium/pool wing was converted into classrooms. The entire building was also renovated to meet safety codes. During the renovation, areas that had been sealed off during previous construction revealed graffiti dating back to around the 1950s.

The Urbana Park District Indoor Aquatic Center was built in 2003. Being adjoined to Urbana High School, it brings the building to its current state.

Beginning in 2011, the Urbana School District (USD) #116 began construction on several projects to update the older facilities. The school demolished its football and soccer fields in the spring of 2011 and combined them into a new state-of-the-art football/soccer field with artificial turf and several bleachers. It was called the Urbana Tigers Athletic Complex and the project cost an estimated $4.3 million. Cobb Memorial Auditorium underwent a complete renovation in 2012 which restored and reincorporated the historical features of its earlier design. Its estimated cost was $4.6 million. Additional improvements to the facilities were finalized at the end of 2012.

== Notable alumni ==
- Lou Bloomfield (1974) Physics professor and fellow of the American Physical Society.
- LaToya Bond (2002) Professional basketball player. Played for the Indiana Fever and Charlotte Sting in the WNBA.
- Karen Brems Kurreck (1980) Olympic and World Champion cyclist, and collegiate gymnast.
- Roger Ebert (1960) Film critic. During his senior year he was co-editor of the school newspaper, the Echo.
- Mauricio González Sfeir (1973) Secretary of Energy of Bolivia and oversaw the building of the Bolivia-to-Brazil gas pipeline.
- Steven Hager (1969) Journalist and author. Wrote the book Hip Hop and the film Beat Street before becoming editor-in-chief of High Times.
- Erika Harold (1997) Former Miss America 2003.
- Robert W. Holley (1938) Biochemist. Awarded the Nobel Prize in Physiology or Medicine in 1968.
- Edwin G. Krebs (1936) Biochemist. Awarded the Nobel Prize in Physiology or Medicine in 1992.
- Ella Masar (2004) Professional soccer player. 1 cap for US women's national soccer team, played in the National Women's Soccer League, USL W-League, and in Europe.
- Carlos Montezuma (Wassaja) (1879) Native American activist and a founding member of the Society of American Indians.
- Kristina Olson (1999) Psychologist. Known for her research on the development of social categories, transgender youth, and variation in human gender development.
- Tyke Peacock (1979) Men's high jump silver medalist at the 1983 World Championships.
- Mark Roberts (1979) Actor, screenwriter & comedian. Best known for producing and writing for the TV series Two and a Half Men and Mike and Molly.
- Joseph Royer (1890s) Architect. Designed the 1914 section of the current UHS building, the Urbana Free Library, the Champaign County Court House, and many schools across Illinois and Iowa.
- Alexander D. Shimkin (1962) Journalist. Was killed in the Vietnam War in 1972 while reporting for Newsweek. Notable for his investigation of Operation Speedy Express.
- Nancy Thies (1975) Gymnast and Olympian. During her career, she worked as an analyst on NBC-TV, authored several books, volunteered at and led nonprofit organizations, and served on numerous advisory boards.
- David Foster Wallace (1980) Author and essayist. He was the subject of the film The End of the Tour.
- James Wilson (1969) DJ and author. More commonly known as Chef Ra, was senior class president in 1969 and later became a reggae DJ for WEFT and a columnist for High Times.

== Notable faculty ==
- J.C. Caroline, a former NFL player for the Chicago Bears, taught physical education at Urbana and was the head football coach for four seasons.
- Charles Carpenter (Lt. Col.), a highly decorated Second World War artillery observation pilot nicknamed "Bazooka Charlie"; destroyed several German armored vehicles in his bazooka-equipped Piper L-4 Cub/Grasshopper light observation aircraft, christened Rosie the Rocketeer. Carpenter became seriously ill and he returned to work as a history teacher at Urbana High School until his death in 1966 at the age of 53.
- Timothy V. Johnson was a former United States representative.
