= List of cannabis seed companies =

This is a list of cannabis seed companies. Some of these supply only hempseed, that is, cultivars that produce low levels of THC (allowable levels are determined by local regulation).

- BSF Seeds
- Coopérative Centrale Des Producteurs De Semences De Chanvre, France, is the main supplier of hempseed in the European Union.
- Dutch Passion
- The Flying Dutchman
- Homegrown Fantasy
- Humboldt Seed Company
- Schiavi Seeds
- Sensi Seeds
- Serious Seeds
- Soma Seeds

== United States regulation ==
Prior to enactment of the 2018 United States farm bill, hempseed imports to the United States had to be made through the Drug Enforcement Administration.
