= Humboldt Seed Company =

Cannabis seed company

- Logo
- Founded: 2001
- Founder: Nathaniel Pennington
- Website: humboldtseedcompany.com

Humboldt Seed Company is a cannabis seed company based in the U.S. state of California. The company was founded by Nathaniel Pennington in 2001 in the Emerald Triangle of Northern California.

The company holds a database of Cannabis phenotypes covering thousands of individual plants, and an inventory of their seeds or living plants. Samples were obtained starting in 2018, in "phenotype hunts" with the participation of California growers.

In 2022, it was the first company to register autoflowering cannabis in Colombia.

== Marketing ==
In 2022, the company created the first scratch and sniff cannabis product packaging, incorporating terpenes matching the sealed contents.

In July 2025, Humboldt Seed Company participated in the California State Fair’s Cannabis Experience exhibit, where visitors aged 21 and older could purchase cannabis seed packets for one penny to comply with state regulations. The company supplied over 15,000 seeds for the event, which organizers called one of the largest legal public seed distributions in U.S. history. The initiative aimed to promote home cultivation and reduce stigma around cannabis.

== See also ==
- List of cannabis seed companies
