= Steven Hager =

American writer and filmmaker

- Born: May 25, 1951 (age 75); Champaign-Urbana, Illinois, U.S.
- Education: University of Illinois at Urbana-Champaign
- Occupations: Journalist, Author, Documentarian, Podcaster
- Employer: High Times magazine (1988–2013)
- Known for: Creating the Cannabis Cup; High Times Freedom Fighters; The Pot Illuminati
- Spouse: Stacy Fine
- Parent(s): Lowell P. Hager and Frances Faye Erea Hager

Steven Hager (born May 25, 1951, Illinois) is an American writer, journalist, filmmaker, and counterculture and cannabis rights activist. He is known for his long association with High Times magazine.

== Biography ==
=== Early life and education ===
Hager was born on May 25, 1951, in Champaign-Urbana, Illinois, the son of Lowell P. Hager and Frances Faye Erea Hager.

While a student in junior high, he established his first publication, the Cap'n Crunch Courier, a humor xerox zine that was given away free. Two years later, while a student at Urbana High School, he created The Tin Whistle, a monthly newspaper that was eventually distributed in four high schools in Central Illinois.

Hager briefly visited Haight-Ashbury in 1968, and the following year he attended the first Woodstock festival.

He obtained a Bachelor of Fine Arts in Theater (Playwriting), and a Masters of Science in Journalism, both from the University of Illinois at Urbana-Champaign.

=== Early career ===
After graduation, Hager moved to New York City, and worked for a number of magazines before becoming a reporter for the New York Daily News.

=== Hip hop journalist ===
During this time, he began researching the hip-hop movement of the South Bronx. His first article on this subculture was published in 1982 on the cover of the Village Voice, and was the first time the words "hip hop" appeared in a major publication. Hager based his article on interviews with Afrika Bambaataa, founder of the Universal Zulu Nation, and one of the three original hip hop DJs (the others being Kool Herc and Grandmaster Flash).

Not too long afterward, Hager sold his original story, "The Perfect Beat," to Harry Belafonte, who took some elements from it, including the subject and some of the characters' names, to produce the film Beat Street, released by Orion Pictures in 1984.

In 1984, St. Martin's Press released Hager's groundbreaking book, Hip Hop: The Illustrated History of Break Dancing, Rap Music, and Graffiti.

Hager followed that book in 1986 with Art After Midnight, an examination of the New York nightclub scene and its influence on artists, primarily Jean-Michel Basquiat, Keith Haring and Kenny Scharf. (The entire text of Art After Midnight, including some much-quoted Basquiat comments, was reprinted in two previous anthologies, but he entire interview was not published until 2026, when it appeared in Art After Midnight: Conversations with Steven Hager A-L, one of two companion books for the original text. )

=== High Times ===
In 1988, Hager began a long relationship with High Times magazine, as he was hired as the magazine's editor-in-chief. He is most well-known for removing positive coverage of hard drugs (e.g., cocaine and heroin) from the magazine, and instead concentrating on advocating for the personal cultivation of cannabis. Hager became the first editor to publish and promote the work of hemp activist Jack Herer.

Under Hager's leadership, High Times created the Cannabis Cup, a cannabis awards ceremony held every Thanksgiving in Amsterdam; and The High Times Freedom Fighters, the first hemp legalization group. The High Times Freedom Fighters were famous for dressing up in Colonial outfits and organizing hemp rallies across the United States. One rally, The Boston Freedom Rally, quickly became the largest political event in the country, drawing an audience of over 100,000 to the Boston Common. Hager created a garage rock revival band called the Soul Assassins. The band played many of the hemp rallies. Their biggest show was opening for the Butthole Surfers in front of 50,000 people in Washington, DC.

As editor, Hager brought on a friend from high school, Jim Wilson, to become a columnist for High Times. Wilson became known as Chef Ra and contributed a cooking-with-pot article in every issue of the magazine for 15 years. Chef Ra was also a member of the High Times Freedom Fighters and became the featured speaker at many of the rallies.

In 1990, Hager became the first person outside Marin County, California to promote 420; as a result, subsequent Freedom Fighter councils, Cannabis Cup ceremonies, and Whee! festivals were always scheduled for 4:20 PM.

In September 1991, Hager wrote an article in High Times titled "Heritage of Stone," a comprehensive analysis of the assassination of John F. Kennedy that has been widely circulated on the Internet as a definitive article on the subject. The article indicated Kennedy was likely murdered because of his growing opposition to the Vietnam War, and implicated J. Edgar Hoover and Allen Dulles in the cover-up. Judge Jim Garrison cited it as "the best magazine article ever written on the subject."

Hager created the Counterculture Hall of Fame in 1997 as part of the Cannabis Cup ceremonies.

In the mid-1990s, Hager turned the membership list of the Freedom Fighters over to the National Organization for the Reform of Marijuana Laws (NORML), and began concentrating on creating events that advocated the environmental benefits of hemp while also demonstrating the spiritual uses of cannabis. The World Hemp Expo Extravaganja, or WHEE! Festivals, were held in Oregon, Washington, Michigan, New York, and Ohio. Unfortunately, most of the promoters who held Whee! festivals found themselves subject to intense law enforcement efforts to shut down their venues. The primary focus of Whee! was a silent, Sunday, sunset meditation for peace in the war on drugs. During this period, Hager was contacted by the Waldos, the inventors of 420, and became the first person to interview them.

Hager was fired as High Times editor-in-chief in 2003. His 2004 book, The Octopus Conspiracy and Other Vignettes of the Counterculture: From Hippies to High Times to Hip-Hop and Beyond, compiles some of his previously published work; the chapter "Nomenclature of an Octopus Cabal" theorizes that a network of secret societies manufactures war for profit and social control.

By 2005, Hager was rehired at High Times, first as the creative director, and then in 2006, back in the position of editor-in-chief, but by 2009 had returned to the role of creative director.

He was again let go by the magazine in 2013, eventually suing High Times for defrauding him of his ownership shares in the company.

=== Documentary film work ===
Hager learned to shoot and edit video, and started documenting all research on videotape. He has produced several feature documentaries, including Let Freedom Ring, Secrets of the Dutch Grow Masters, The Cannabis Cup, Saint Stephen, The Tom Forcade Story, and The 20th Cannabis Cup, assembling one of the world's largest archives of cannabis-related video.

In 2002 he directed the video shoot that was later released as Live in Amsterdam. In 2004, he wrote most of the narration for a/k/a Tommy Chong, and also appears in the film. Hager appeared in Episode #12 ("Pittsburgh") of the Showtime series Weeds, playing himself at an event modeled on the Cannabis Cup.

In 2007, he produced a reality television show based around his job at High Times magazine. Hager appears in the 2013 film 420: The Documentary and provides the history of the phrase and its ceremonial use, as well as his role in spreading awareness on the spiritual aspects of cannabis.

On April 19, 2021, Hager released his first film in 13 years, Green Easter.

In December, 2023, Hager announced the creation of a peace sanctuary and festival site to be created in the Catskills. The opening ceremonies, titled "Camp Fun," will be held on the Summer Solstice 2024 and co-hosted by Patti Astor. The event has a Facebook page and GoFundMe.

=== Later activities ===
In 2014 Hager created Abakus Media in Denver, published the ebook Cannabis Cures Cancer?, and founded the religious organization the Pot Illuminati.

His essay "The New Pot Enlightenment" was included in the 2016 book Cannabis and Spirituality: An Explorer's Guide to an Ancient Plant Spirit Ally.

During the COVID-19 pandemic, Hager created a podcast titled Everything You Know is Twisted.

On April 19, 2024, Hager released an expose on Youtube titled: Origins of High Times magazine. The film accuses the lawyer Micheal Kennedy of stealing the magazine from the employees.

On January 1, 2025, Hager released an expose on his history with High Times magazine that details the actions of the lawyer who was running the company.

On April 16, 2025, Hager released his first album titled Psyop-Busting Ballads. He wrote all 13 songs in four days. There are ballads on Jean-Michel Basquiat, Benjamin Melendez, Lee Harvey Oswald, John Wilkes Booth, Zoroaster, The Holy Grail, the Weather Underground, among others.

In July, 2025, New Orleans-based Pot Culture Magazine, posted the first bio of Hager in the media in 36 years. The first had been in Details magazine 1988 and had been titled "Bedtime for Bongo."

In August 2026, Hager published two novels and two screenplays reforging the story of Camelot around the thesis that Merlin fell in with Scythian troubadours and learned to use cannabis fumigation and soma for healing the sick. The scripts are musicals and demos of the songs were put on his YouTube channel.

In October 2026, Hager loaded his extensive archives into AI in order to produce nine books, four of which were updated, indexed, and sourced versions of previous books, while five were entirely new.

== Bibliography ==
- Hip Hop: The Illustrated History of Break Dancing, Rap Music, and Graffiti (St. Martin's Press, 1984; KDP, 2014)
- Art After Midnight: The East Village Scene (St. Martin's Press, 1986; KDP, 2014, 2026)
- Adventures in the Counterculture: From Hip Hop to High Times (High Times Books, 2002)
- The Octopus Conspiracy: And Other Vignettes of the Counterculture from Hippies to High Times to Hip Hop and Beyond (Trine Day, 2005)
- Cannabis Cures Cancer? (KDP, 2014)
- The Bitcoin Revolution (KDP 2014)
- Killing Lincoln: The Real Story (KDP, 2014; IngramSpark, 2026))
- Hip Hop: The Complete Archives (KDP, 2014, IngramSpark, 2026))
- Killing Kennedy: The Real Story (KDP 2017, IngramSpark 2026)
- The Smoke and the Grail (KDP, 2026))
- Everything You Know is Twisted (KDP 2026)
- The High Times Papers (IngramSpark, KDP 2026)
- Art After Midnight A-L (IngramSpark, KDP 2026)
- Art After Midnight M-Z ( KDP 2026)
- The Birth of Destructo-Mania (IngramSpark, KDP)
- The Wandering Years (IngramSpark, KDP)

== Filmography ==
- Beat Street (Orion Pictures, 1984; story credit)
- Chef Ra Escapes Babylon (High Times Productions, 1989; consultant)
- Let Freedom Ring (High Times Productions, 1990; producer)
- 8th Cannabis Cup (High Times Productions, 1995; producer)
- 9th Cannabis Cup (High Times Productions, 1996; producer)
- 11th Cannabis Cup (High Times Productions, 1999; producer/director/editor)
- Grow Secrets of the Dutch Masters (High Times Productions, 2000; producer/director/editor)
- High Times Presents the Cannabis Cup (Koch Vision, 2003; producer, director, writer)
- Live in Amsterdam (High Times Records, 2005; director)
- a/k/a Tommy Chong (Blue Chief Entertainment, 2006; co-writer; subject in film)
- Miss High Times Swimsuit Video (High Times Productions, 2008; producer)
- High Times Presents the 20th Anniversary Cannabis Cup (High Times Productions, 2008; producer)
- 420-The Documentary (Harm Reduction Productions, 2014; subject in film; consultant)
- Grass Is Greener (Netflix; 2019; subject in film; consultant)
- When World's Collide (Green Hummingbird Entertainment, 2020; audio interviews with Basquait, Scharf, and Haring)
- Green Easter (Zero Budget Productions, 2021, 68-minute documentary)
- History of 4/20 in 3 Acts (Pot Illuminati Productions, 2022, 26-minute documentary)
- Origins of High Times Magazine (Zero Budget Productions, 2024, 2-hour documentary)
- It's in the Rig Veda (Zero Budget Productions, 2025, 90-minute documentary)
