= Lowell P. Hager =

American protein biochemist (1926–2014)

Lowell P. Hager (1926 − 15 April 2014) was an internationally known enzymologist and protein chemist. He was head of the department of biochemistry at the University of Illinois where he was a member of the faculty since 1960 and head of the department for 20 years. He was elected to the National Academy of Sciences in 1995. He was best known for his work on halogenating enzymes and heme peroxidases, chemicals found widely in biochemical systems.

== Early life and education ==
He was born in 1926 and raised in the small town of Hepler, Kansas. He has a bachelor's degree from Valparaiso University in Indiana, earned in 1947. He has a master's degree (1950) from the University of Kansas and a PhD (1953) from University of Illinois at Urbana-Champaign. He worked in the laboratory of I.C. "Gunny" Gunsalus, and for his postdoctoral studies he worked with Fritz Lipmann at Harvard Medical School.

== Career ==
In 1955 he joined the chemistry department at Harvard, but returned to the University of Illinois where he joined the faculty in 1960, where he remained for the rest of his career. He was the head of the division of biochemistry from 1967 until 1969 and then became the first head of the school's newly created department of biochemistry.

== Awards and honors ==
In 1995 he was elected to the National Academy of Sciences. He was also the inaugural recipient of the William Rutter Chair in Biochemistry in 1996.

== Personal life ==
Hager married Frances Faye Erea in 1948, who died in 2003. Together they had three children, including journalist Steven Hager. He died on 15 April 2014 and was survived by his four children and six grandchildren.
