= Coke La Rock =

American rapper (born 1955)

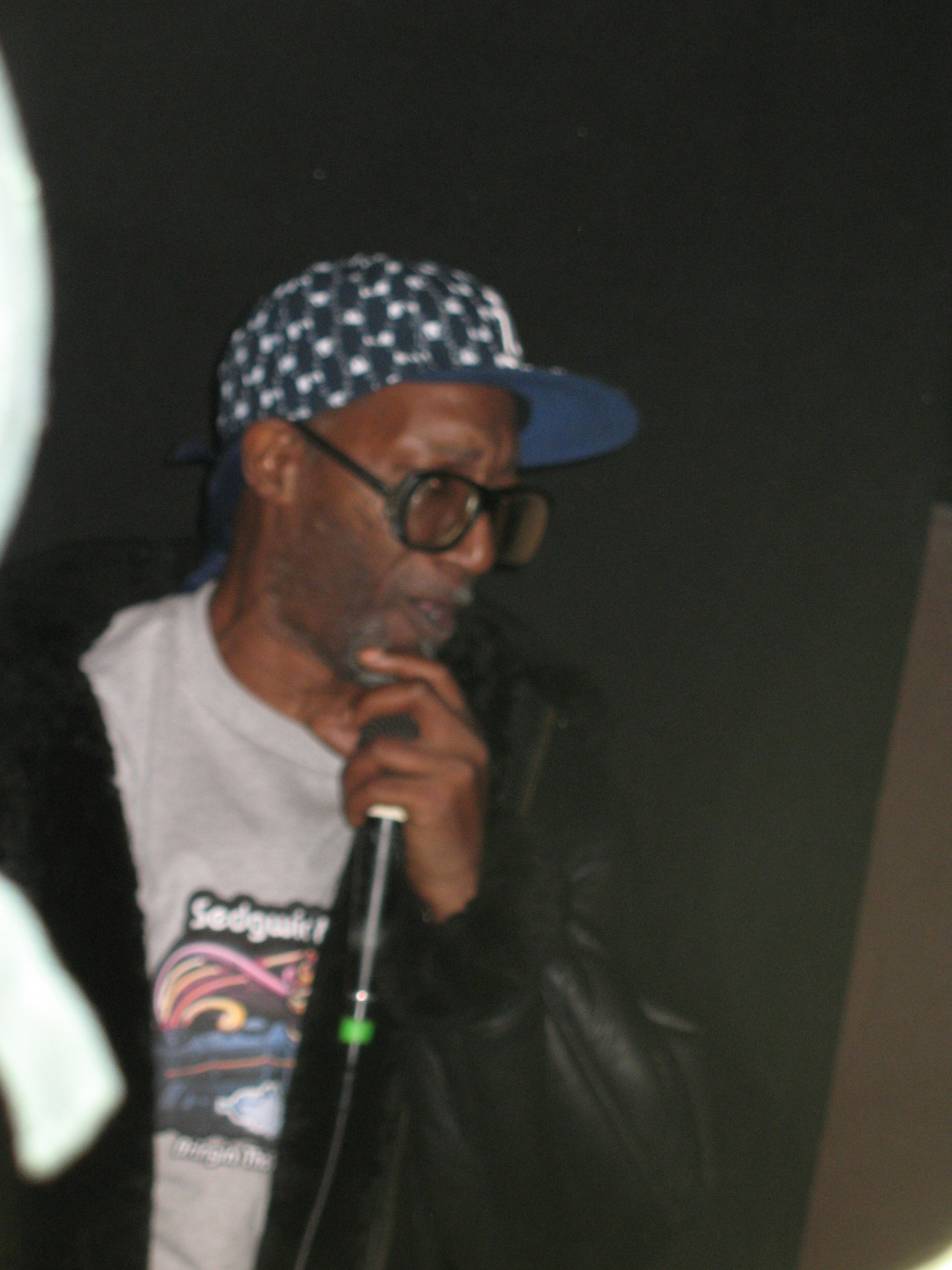
- Coke La Rock performing with DJ Kool Herc at a February 28, 2009 event in the Bronx.

Background information
- Also known as: Coco La Rock, A-1 Coke, Nasty Coke
- Born: April 24, 1955 (age 71)
- Genre: Hip hop
- Occupation: Rapper
- Years active: 1973–present
- Label: Sugar Hill

Coke La Rock (aka Coco La Rock; born April 24, 1955) is an American rapper from New York City who is sometimes credited as being the first MC in the history of hip-hop. In 2010, he was inducted into the High Times Counterculture Hall of Fame at the annual ceremonies at the Cannabis Cup in Amsterdam.

== Kool Herc and Coke La Rock ==
La Rock was born in The Bronx, New York City on April 24, 1955, with family roots going back to North Carolina.

Coke La Rock was a friend and musical partner of DJ Kool Herc, who himself is generally considered to have laid down the foundation for hip-hop music starting in 1973. La Rock was an original member of Herc's MC crew, the Herculoids.

According to Herc, Coke La Rock's MC name had various iterations, beginning as "A-1 Coke," and then moving on to "Nasty Coke" before it was finalized as "Coke La Rock".

Coke La Rock joined Kool Herc for his first party, in 1973, to celebrate Herc's sister Cindy's birthday. It wasn't until about the fifth or sixth party that he took the name Coke La Rock. The name came to him in a dream. Before that time, he had no name and did his rapping out of sight from the audience, so no one knew who was doing the rapping.

His original raps were usually shout-outs to friends, but gradually the poetry emerged. He originated such phrases as "You rock and you don't stop," and "Hotel, motel, you don't tell, we won't tell" (which was immortalized on the first Sugarhill Gang single "Rapper's Delight", although La Rock received no credit).

Coke La Rock's raps were always purely improvisational, unlike those of later 70s-era rap groups, —such as the Furious Five and Cold Crush Brothers, who wrote down and rehearsed their rhymes and created elaborate routines. According to La Rock, while rapping "at first I would just call out [my friends'] names. Then I pretended dudes had double-parked cars; that was to impress the girls. Truthfully, I wasn’t there to rap, I was just playing around."

Nonetheless, La Rock's raps would, as with much else at Kool Herc's parties in the mid-1970s, serve as a basic model for other hip-hop artists that would come onto the Bronx music scene by the end of the decade. La Rock himself has argued, in a reference to two pioneering New York City narcotics dealers, that "me and Herc were to hip-hop what Nicky Barnes and Frank Lucas were to drugs."

== Decline in popularity and later years ==
As other nascent hip-hop groups patterned themselves after Herc and La Rock and improved on their formula, the popularity of Herc and the Herculoids began to wane as early as 1977.

After Kool Herc was stabbed at a party, La Rock went looking to kill the perpetrator, who was part of the Executive Playhouse crew. He found the man's friends in a Bronx pool hall, but they had already moved their friend down south to avoid a confrontation. After this incident, La Rock decided to step away from hip hop and let the younger generation move in. Since he'd had a long run lasting several years of being on top of the Bronx hip hop scene, La Rock didn't want to continue if murder was going to continue to be part of the game. Also his son, Donte La Rock, had just been born, and he needed to spend more time at home.

Gary Harris, an employee of the first hip-hop record label, Sugar Hill, noted that "people respected Herc and Coke, but by the early eighties those guys were like specters—they just weren’t visible on the scene anymore." In contrast to other early Bronx hip-hop artists like Afrika Bambaataa and Grandmaster Flash, Coke La Rock—like his partner Kool Herc—never achieved any recording success (indeed he did not record at all). However, late 2008 saw the release of what was deemed the first ever recording featuring La Rock, a song titled "Hello – Merry Christmas Baby!" which was released by Sedgwick & Cedar as part of a special holiday compilation to pay homage to the birthplace of hip-hop.

La Rock's place in hip-hop history was arguably immortalized in the legendary 1986 Boogie Down Productions song "South Bronx" (the opening salvo of the so-called "Bridge Wars") wherein KRS-One raps this:

Now way back in the days when hip-hop began
With Coke La Rock, Kool Herc, and then Bam

Coke La Rock had no association with, nor relation to, KRS-One's DJ at the time, Scott La Rock. Nor did Coke La Rock and another influential old-school MC, T La Rock, know one another in the early days of hip-hop, and thus the name similarity is coincidental.

In 2021, after years of being absent from the hip hop scene, Coke La Rock returned to the microphone with a verse on the DJ Kay Slay posse track "Rolling 110 Deep".

In 2023 he returned once again to deliver a verse on "Rolling 200 Deep".

== Live Recordings ==
L Brothers vs The Herculoids – Bronx River Centre (1978)

DJ Kool Herc and Whiz kid with the Herculoids: Live at T-Connection (1981)
