= Chef Ra =

Writer and activist

- Chef Ra speaking at 1997 Hash Bash
- Born: Jim Wilson Jr. October 10, 1950; Charleston, West Virginia
- Died: December 26, 2006 (aged 56); Urbana, Illinois
- Education: Urbana High School; University of Illinois Urbana-Champaign
- Culinary career
- Cooking style: Ganja (marijuana)

Chef Ra (October 10, 1950 – December 26, 2006), born Jim Wilson Jr., was a long-time cannabis rights advocate and cannabis foods writer in the United States. After gaining notoriety as a ganja gourmet and appearing on the November 1987 cover of High Times, he began writing "Chef Ra's Psychedelic Kitchen" in 1988 at the request of magazine editor Steven Hager. Ra was a fixture of Ann Arbor's Hash Bash, speaking out about the benefits of cannabis for 19 consecutive years before his death at the age of 56.

== Biography ==
=== Early life ===
Though born in Charleston, West Virginia, by high school Wilson had moved to the Champaign–Urbana metropolitan area. He was the first Black student elected Senior Class President at Urbana High. Wilson was later banned from the football team, because of his association with fellow student Steven Hager, who later hired Wilson to write for High Times.

=== Writings ===
Chef Ra's Psychedelic Kitchen column appeared in High Times off and on for 15 years. The articles would weave together Ra's insights on life together with a new ganja recipe. Ra would also report on travels to cannabis culture events.

=== Filmography ===
Chef Ra starred in a pair of videos produced by High Times, including Chef Ra Escapes Babylon (1989) and Ganja Gourmet (2003). The former features Ra's visit to Jamaica, and had a rare public screening at the 1998 Freaky Film Festival in Champaign-Urbana. Ra was featured in the short film Bumbaclots in Negril (1999) alongside fellow High Times staffers.

=== Death ===
He died in his sleep of complications from cardiovascular disease on December 26, 2006, at the age of 56.
