= Jeff Goldberg =

American science and medical writer

Jeff Goldberg is an American writer, who has published on the cultural history of psychoactive drugs, and how they work in the brain. He is the author of Flowers in the Blood, a history of opium, and Anatomy of a Scientific Discovery, an account of the race to discover endorphins, the body's own morphine. He has also written numerous articles about science and medicine, for Life, Discover, Omni and other magazines internationally.

== Life and work ==
Goldberg began his career in New York City as a member of the circle of writers and artists surrounding William S. Burroughs (Junky, Naked Lunch). In 1978, Goldberg's role as the Press Liaison for the Nova Convention, a 3-day event honoring Burroughs, fostered an ongoing association with the author based on a common interest in the history of drugs, particularly opioids and the then-recently discovered endorphins. Goldberg was introduced to another important influence while working as an editor at High Times magazine, a publication devoted to recreational drugs and drug culture (1978–79), where he began a collaboration with Dean Latimer, alternate press journalist, best known for his reporting on the illegal drug trade. A 1979 Oui magazine article about opium ("The Opium Reader"), written by Goldberg and edited by Latimer, became the basis of the book Flowers in the Blood: The Story of Opium, which they coauthored in 1980.

After Flowers in the Blood, Goldberg turned his attention to "the body's own opiates". His next book, Anatomy of a Scientific Discovery, is an account of how endorphins were discovered at the University of Aberdeen in Scotland, by John Hughes and Hans Kosterlitz, in a race pitting them against American research teams and scientists at Sandoz, Roche, and other major pharmaceutical companies. Anatomy of a Scientific Discovery continues to be regarded as an authoritative documentation of both the science and the scientists involved in the discovery of endorphins.

His articles on science and medicine have covered pioneering attempts at gene therapy, and an oral history by the Apollo astronauts on the 20th anniversary of the Moon landing. His Life magazine article on the controversy over fetal cell transplantation, "Who Gets to Play God", won the American Legion Auxiliary's Heart of America award.

== Bibliography ==
=== Books ===
- Flowers in the blood : the story of opium (1980)
- Anatomy of a scientific discovery

=== Articles ===
- Goldberg, Jeff (July 1995). "Fetal attraction". Discover. 16 (7): 86–93.
