= Danny Danko =

American cannabis writer and editor

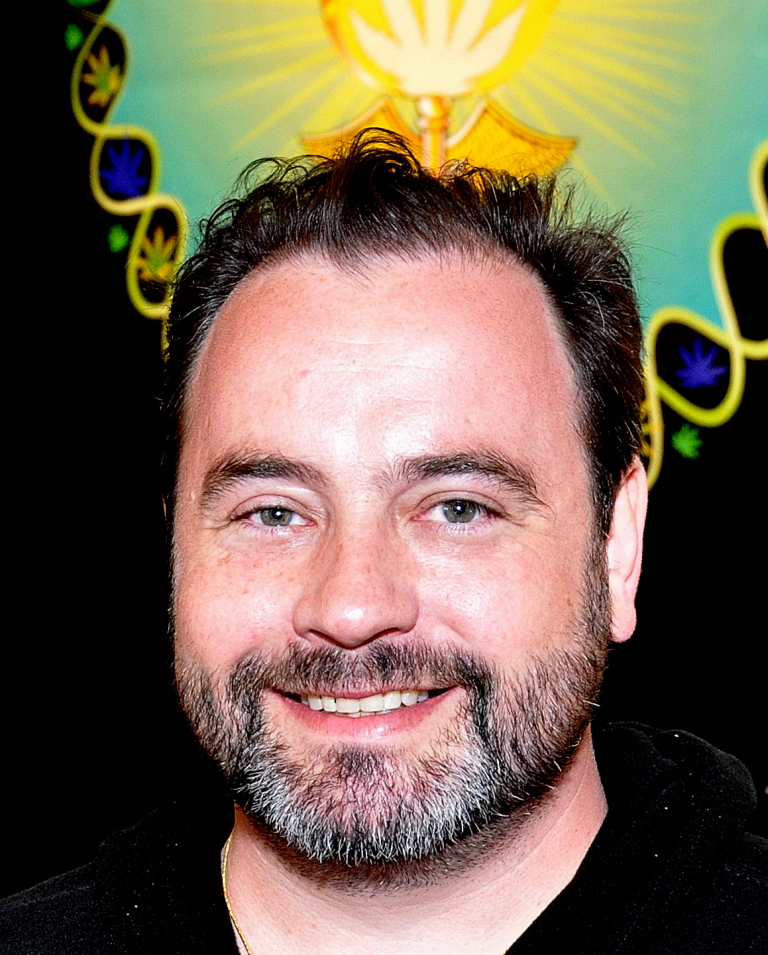
- Danko in 2010
- Born: Daniel Vinkovetsky; July 4, 1972 (age 54); Leningrad
- Education: Boston University
- Occupations: Writer, editor, podcast host
- Notable work: The Official High Times Field Guide to Marijuana Strains; Cannabis: A Beginner's Guide to Growing Marijuana
- Website: dannydanko.com

Danny Danko (born Daniel Vinkovetsky; July 4, 1972) is an American writer, editor, and podcast host whose work focuses on cannabis cultivation. He was formerly the senior cultivation editor of High Times and an editor of Northeast Leaf. He hosts the podcast Grow Bud Yourself!.

== Early life ==
Danko was born Daniel Vinkovetsky in Leningrad, Soviet Union, on July 4, 1972. He grew up in the United States and studied sociology at Boston University.

== Career ==
=== High Times ===
Danko joined High Times in 2002 and subsequently became its senior cultivation editor.

=== Northeast Leaf ===
Danko left High Times magazine in April 2020 due to COVID-19 layoffs. In July 2020, Danko was one of four former High Times senior staffers to launch Northeast Leaf, a free monthly print magazine focused on the growing cannabis communities and businesses in the Northeast.

=== Podcasting ===
Danko hosted Free Weed from Danny Danko from 2011 to 2018. He subsequently became the host of Grow Bud Yourself!, a podcast about cannabis cultivation.

== Publications ==
- The Official High Times Field Guide to Marijuana Strains. High Times Books, 2011. ISBN 978-1-893010-28-4.
- Cannabis: A Beginner's Guide to Growing Marijuana. Hampton Roads Publishing, 2018. ISBN 978-1-57174-846-1.
