= A/k/a Tommy Chong =

a/k/a Tommy Chong
- Theatrical release poster
- Directed by: Josh Gilbert
- Written by: Josh Gilbert; Steven Hager
- Produced by: Josh Gilbert
- Starring: Tommy Chong; Eric Schlosser; Lou Adler; Bill Maher; Jay Leno; Cheech Marin
- Distributed by: Blue Chief Entertainment
- Release date: June 14, 2006
- Running time: 78 minutes
- Language: English

a/k/a Tommy Chong is a 2006 documentary film written, produced, and directed by Josh Gilbert, that chronicles the Drug Enforcement Administration (DEA) raid on comedian Tommy Chong's house and his subsequent jail sentence for trafficking in illegal drug paraphernalia. He was sentenced to nine months in federal prison. DEA agents raided Chong's Pacific Palisades, California home on the morning of February 24, 2003. The raid was part of Operation Pipe Dreams and "Operation Headhunter," which resulted in raids on 100 homes and businesses nationwide that day and indictments of 55 individuals.

The film was shown at film festivals in 2005 and 2006 and had its first, art-house theatrical release on June 14, 2006, at the Film Forum in New York City. The film features appearances by Bill Maher and Jay Leno, who express support for Chong and outrage over federal handling of the incident. Eric Schlosser, author of Reefer Madness: Sex, Drugs, and Cheap Labor in the American Black Market, provides "a much needed dollop of historical and political context". The film was presented on the Showtime cable network on November 9, 2008. The film received positive reviews.

== Synopsis ==
The film depicts Tommy Chong of Cheech & Chong and his legal problems with the Department of Justice. Filmmaker Josh Gilbert follows the tale of Chong as he becomes a target in a government sting, code named "Operation Pipe Dreams". Tommy Chong was the only defendant without a prior conviction to receive a jail sentence. The federal government stated that the reason that it sought this harsh punishment was because the comedy movie Up In Smoke trivialized the government's anti-drug efforts.

The documentary discloses that Tommy Chong's son, who actually ran the company which sold the paraphernalia was never charged or indicted by the Federal government. In May 2008 federal agents raided the owner of the distribution rights to this DVD.

The documentary is critical of the prosecution of Chong by the U.S. federal government led by the U.S. attorney for western Pennsylvania, Mary Beth Buchanan.

== Reception ==
=== Reviews ===
The film received positive reviews. Entertainment Weekly gave it a "B", calling it a "slender, revealing documentary, ... is a portrait of resilience: Chong does his time (nine months) and has the last laugh, emerging as a born-again activist-survivor of the culture wars." In the New York Daily News, Elizabeth Weltzmen gave the film 2 1/2 stars (of 4), writing, "... even those unimpressed with [Cheech & Chong's] genially lowbrow work will be intrigued by the political tenor of this portrait." She continues, "Gilbert blatantly takes Chong's side, so your level of empathy will rise or fall depending on how strongly you connect with his subject." Wesley Morris of the Boston Globe wrote, "This isn't a great piece of nonfiction filmmaking, but it has its moments", stating that Chong's presence in the film lent "a serene counterpoint to the farce Gilbert makes of the Justice Department...", but, "the movie does succeed in showing us the graying cult star as a gratuitous drug-war casualty". At review aggregator Rotten Tomatoes, the film has a score of 71% among 21 selected critic reviews.

=== Recognition ===
- Official Selection – Toronto International Film Festival
- Official Selection – IDFA: International Documentary Festival Amsterdam
- Official Selection – Palm Springs International Film Festival
- Official Selection – Miami International Film Festival
- Official Selection – SXSW Film Festival
- Official Selection – Full Frame Documentary Festival
- Winner, Best Documentary – HBO US Comedy Arts Festival
- Audience Award, Best Documentary – San Francisco Independent Film Festival
- Audience Award Runner Up, Best International Film – Vancouver International Film Festival

== Seizure of DVDs ==
On May 7, 2008, federal agents raided Spectrum Labs as part of an investigation related to "drug masking products" used to fool drug tests. Chong alleges that 8,000 to 10,000 copies of his yet-to-be released documentary, which he claims were seized by the authorities, were the actual focal point of the raid. "It's a way to punish the distributor financially," Mr. Chong said. "There's no way to get the DVDs back until the investigation is over." However, attorneys for Spectrum Labs have said no copies of the documentary were seized. U.S. Attorney Mary Beth Buchanan, who led the investigation, refused to comment on Mr. Chong's allegation.
