= Soma Seeds =

Cannabis seed company

- Industry: Medical
- Headquarters: Amsterdam, Netherlands
- Products: Medical cannabis
- Owner: Soma
- Website: www.somaseeds.nl

Soma Seeds (also known as Soma's Sacred Seeds) is an Amsterdam based medical cannabis seed company owned by Soma. The company became internationally famous after winning the 1999 High Times Cannabis Cup with Soma's 'Reclining Buddha' strain in the Indica category; in 2001, 2002, 2003 and 2004 with 'NYC Diesel' strain in the Sativa category, in 2002 with 'Buddha's Sister' strain in the Indica category in 2004 with 'Amnesia Haze' in the best strain category and in 2005 with 'Lavender' strain in the Indica category.
