= Josh Gilbert (filmmaker) =

Josh Gilbert (1962 – November 26, 2016) was an American screenwriter and documentary filmmaker, best known for producing and directing a/k/a Tommy Chong in 2006, a documentary about comedy legend, Tommy Chong, one half of the duo Cheech & Chong. The documentary premiered at the Toronto International Film Festival before playing the International Documentary Film Festival Amsterdam and winning Audience Awards At the San Francisco Independent Film Festival, Vancouver International Film Festival, and the Jury Prize for Best Documentary at The U.S. Comedy Arts Festival in Aspen, Colorado. The film premiered theatrically in June, 2006, at the Film Forum in New York City and its worldwide broadcast premiere on Showtime Networks in 2008.

Additionally, Gilbert garnered acting credits in short films and was the star of the indie drama ALMOST FAMILY (2014).

Before his death,Flaunt Magazine reported that Gilbert was in the process of making a new documentary about a young autistic man named Jake, who aspires to become a professional filmmaker.

Josh Gilbert died on November 26, 2016, after a long battle with cancer.
