= High Times Medical Cannabis Cup =

Annual event celebrating medical marijuana

Poster art for the 1st Annual High Times Medical Cannabis Cup, 2010

The High Times Medical Cannabis Cup is an annual event celebrating medical marijuana. The first Medical Cannabis Cup took place in San Francisco, California, on June 19–20, 2010.

Like the High Times Cannabis Cup in Amsterdam, many marijuana strains are judged, and cups (trophies) are awarded in a number of categories at the Medical Cup. However, unlike the Cannabis Cup, the Medical Cannabis Cup focuses on the emerging medical marijuana movement in America. As a result, official judging of the strains and edibles is left to a panel of experts. Attendees receive a list of participating medical marijuana dispensaries and state-approved medical cannabis patients can visit those marijuana dispensaries and sample the entered strains prior to the event.

In addition to awarding the best and most medicinal marijuana, hash, and edibles from legal medical marijuana dispensaries, the event also includes medical cultivation seminars, a product expo, and information on creating a legal "cann-business".

== Past winners ==
=== 2010 San Francisco Medical Cannabis Cup categories and winners ===
Sativa

1. GreanBicycles (Vortex)
2. The Green Door San Francisco (Candy Jack)
3. Purple Lotus Patient Center (Durban Poison)

Indica

1. Mr. Natural Inc (Cali Gold)
2. Elemental Wellness (True OG)
3. Tehama Herbal Collective (Bubba Kush)

Concentrates

1. Leonard Moore Cooperative (Ingrid)
2. Phillips Rx (Herojauna)
3. 7 Stars Holistic Healing Center (Granddaddy Purple Wax)

Edibles

1. Greenway Compassionate Relief (Biscotti)
2. Medithrive (Bliss Edibles Truffles)
3. The Hampton Collective (Totally Baked Medibles Tincture)

Expo Booth

1. Humboldt Patients Resource Center
2. TIE: Cmaz Glass, Green Door
3. Stealth Grow LED

Glass

1. Zong 2 Kink Jack Herer Bong
2. Glass Slider
3. Cmaz Vhorees

Product

1. TIE: Essential Vaaapp H2O Eclipse, Stealth Grow LED
2. Grassroots High Times Medical Cannabis Cup Hat
3. TIE: Canna Fresh, Boldt Bags

=== 2011 San Francisco Medical Cannabis Cup winners ===
SATIVA

1. Granddaddy Purple Collective, Bay 11
2. OrganiCann, Alpha Blue
3. Happy Lil' Trees, Sonoma Coma

Indica

1. Harborside Health Center (San Jose), Delta559's Bogglegum
2. Elemental Wellness Center, The True OG
3. Stars Holistic Healing Center, 7 Star Pure Kush

Hybrid

1. D & M Compassion Center, OG Kush
2. Buds & Roses, Star Dawg
3. Leonard Moore Co-Operative, The Pure

Concentrates

1. Philips Rx, Mars OG
2. Berkeley Patients Group, Sour Diesel Wax
3. The Cali Connection Seed Company Collective, Regulator Kush Wax

Non-Solvent Hash

1. Florin Wellness Center, Herojuana

CBD AWARD

1. Master Control Unit Collective, Alaskan Thunderfuck (9.23%)
2. Elemental Wellness, Center, Jamaican Lion (8.10%)

Edibles Cup

1. Greenway Compassionate Relief's Baklava
2. Bhang Chocolate's Bhang Chocolate Triple Strength Fire Bar
3. Vapor Room Co-operative, Om Chocolate Dipped Peanut Butter Truffle

Best Booth

1. Magnolia Wellness
2. Nor Cal Genetics Seed Collective
3. Element Wellness

Best Product

1. Glass M420 by Incredibowl Industries

=== 2011 Denver Medical Cannabis Cup categories and winners ===
Sativa

1. Snow Dog (Natural Alternatives)
2. Alpha Blue (The Farm)
3. Island Sweet Skunk (Grassroots Wellness)

Indica

1. Banana Kush (Mile High Green Cross)
2. L.A. confidential (420 Wellness)
3. Chemdawg (Highland Health)

Best Hybrid

1. Sour Grape (Mile High Green Cross)
2. White Dawg (A Cut Above)
3. Banana Kush (Highland Health)

Best Concentrates

1. Grape Ape Wax (Salida green Cross)
2. Hong Kong Stable Oil (Broadway Wellness)
3. Lemon G-13 (Greenest Green)

Best Edibles

1. DECA DOSE (Cheeba Chews)
2. Pecanna Bar (Standing Akimbo)
3. Mountain Medicine Blueberry Pie Bar (Good Chemistry)

Best Product

1. Incredibowl m420 (Incredibowl Industries)
2. Vortex Tubes (Hitman Glass)
3. Crucible Titanium Nail/Bar (Broadway Wellness)

Best Glass

1. D-Rock and Adam G. Worked Glass Bubbler (Lazy J's Smoke Shop)
2. Glass Oil Tube with attached Glass Blowtorch (Hitman Glass)
3. Incredibowl Sherlock (Incredibowl Industries)

Best Exhibitor Booth

1. Lazy J's Smoke Shop
2. Incredibowl Industries

== See also ==
- List of cannabis competitions
