= High Times =

American cannabis culture brand founded as a magazine in 1974

- Cover image of the premiere issue of High Times (Summer 1974) featuring model Elizabeth Donoghue.
- Editor-in-Chief: Javier Hasse (July 2025–present)
- Former editors: Ed Dwyer (founding editor); Larry Sloman (1979–1984) Steven Hager (1988–2003, 2006–c. 2013); Chris Simunek (c. 2013–2014); Dan Skye (2014–2020); Jamie Solis (2020–2022); Ellen Holland (2022–2025)
- Categories: Recreational drugs
- Frequency: Monthly
- Circulation: 500,000 (1987)
- Publisher: Trans-High Corporation (1974–2016); Hightimes Holding Corp. (2017–2024)
- Founder: Tom Forçade
- Founded: 1974; 52 years ago
- First issue: Summer 1974
- Company: Hightimes Holding Corp.
- Country: United States
- Based in: Los Angeles (New York City from 1974–2017)
- Language: English
- Website: hightimes.com
- ISSN: 0362-630X

High Times is an American cannabis culture brand that first gained success as a monthly magazine. Founded in 1974 by Tom Forçade, the magazine advocated the legalization of cannabis and related counterculture ideas, eventually expanding to include the media divisions High Times Books and High Times Records.

High Times magazine was published by Trans-High Corporation (THC) from 1974 to 2016, in an apparent pun on the THC comound. Hightimes Holding Corp. acquired THC and the magazine in 2017; financial difficulties forced the magazine to cease publication in 2024. The magazine and all associated assets were purchased in 2025 for $3.5 million. Magazine publication resumed in 2026.

== Overview ==
High Times covers a wide range of topics, including politics, activism, drugs, education, sex, music, and film, as well as photography.

Like Playboy, each issue of High Times contains a centerfold photo; however, instead of a nude woman, High Times typically features a cannabis plant. (The magazine, however, often featured women—occasionally crowned as "Ms. High Times"—on the cover to help newsstand sales.) In addition, the magazine "published writers like Hunter S. Thompson, William S. Burroughs, Charles Bukowski, Allen Ginsberg, and Truman Capote."

== Publication history ==
=== Origins ===
Forçade's previous attempt—via the Underground Press Syndicate/Alternative Press Syndicate—to reach a wide counterculture audience of underground papers had failed, even though he had the support of several noteworthy writers, photographers, and artists. Through High Times, Forçade was able to get his message to the masses without relying on mainstream media. Forçade was quoted as saying, "Those cavemen must've been stoned, no pun intended."

High Times was originally meant to be a joke: a single-issue lampoon of Playboy, substituting marijuana for sex. Brainstorming for the first issue's contents was conducted by a group that included Forcade, Rex Weiner, Ed Dwyer, Robert Singer, A. J. Weberman, Dana Beal, Ed Rosenthal, the underground cartoonist Yossarian a.k.a. Alan Shenker, and Cindy Ornsteen a.k.a. Anastasia Sirocco.

The first issue, 50 pages in total, with the tagline, "The Magazine of High Society," appeared in the summer of 1974. Advertising for the first issue had been pre-sold at that year's National Fashion and Boutique Show. "High Times #1 made its debut at the June 1974 show and was an instant success, selling out its first run of 10,000 copies and getting reprinted twice."

The magazine's first editor was Ed Dwyer, who had earlier written the text of the Woodstock music festival program booklet (as well as the Woodstock film program booklet). The magazine was initially distributed by Homestead Book Company and Big Rapids Distribution.

High Times was at the beginning funded by drug money from the sale of illegal marijuana, But the magazine found an audience, becoming a monthly publication with a growing circulation, and the staff quickly grew to 40 people. Marijuana hydroponics growers were a large part of the magazine's advertiser base.

=== Financial struggles and legal battles ===
High Times founder Forçade committed suicide in November 1978. He bequeathed trusts to benefit High Times and the National Organization for the Reform of Marijuana Laws (NORML). (Forçade had been a supporter of NORML since the organization's founding in 1970.)

Following Forçade's death, the magazine was controlled by "mostly by Forçade’s relatives" and lawyer Michael John Kennedy.

Under the editorship of Larry Sloman (from 1979 to 1984), the magazine consistently struggled against marijuana prohibition laws, and fought to keep itself alive and publishing in an anti-cannabis atmosphere. Reflecting the time period, High Times began to feature positive coverage of cocaine as a recreational drug.

The magazine's former associate publisher, Rick Cusick, said the only way High Times managed to stay in business and never miss a publication date for over four decades was, "Really, really good lawyers, even though everybody knew I was talking about just one—Michael Kennedy." Kennedy served as the general counsel and chairman of the board for High Times for over 40 years until his death in 2016, when his wife and board member, Eleanora Kennedy, took the reins.

=== Mainstream success and the Hager era ===
In 1987, High Times was audited by the Audit Bureau of Circulation as reaching 500,000 copies an issue, rivaling Rolling Stone and National Lampoon.

In 1988, Steven Hager was hired as the magazine's editor. He changed the focus from the promotion of hard drugs (e.g., cocaine and heroin), and instead concentrated on advocating personal cultivation of cannabis. Hager became the first editor to publish and promote the work of hemp activist Jack Herer.

In 1988, under Hager's leadership, the magazine created the Cannabis Cup, a cannabis awards ceremony held every Thanksgiving in Amsterdam that later expanded to a number of U.S. cities. He also formed the High Times Freedom Fighters, the first hemp legalization group. The High Times Freedom Fighters were famous for dressing up in Colonial outfits and organizing hemp rallies across the United States. One rally, the Boston Freedom Rally, quickly became the largest marijuana-related political event in the country, drawing an audience of over 30,00 to the Boston Common in 2013.

The magazine advocated for the widespread use of hemp in the 1990s, publishing a quarterly magazine called Hemp Times and operating a retail location in Manhattan called Planet Hemp.

In 1991, the magazine began featuring celebrities on the cover of the magazine. Over the years, these included Cypress Hill, The Black Crowes, Ziggy Marley, Beavis and Butt-Head, Milla Jovovich, Ice Cube, Wu-Tang Clan, George Carlin, Ozzy Osbourne, Kevin Smith, Frances McDormand, Pauly Shore, Sacha Baron Cohen, Willie Nelson, Woody Harrelson, and Snoop Dogg.

In 1997, the magazine and Hager founded the Counterculture Hall of Fame, with inductions held annually on Thanksgiving as part of the Amsterdam Cannabis Cup event.

In the late 1980s Mike Edison began writing "Shoot the Tube," a featured column about television and politics for High Times. In 1998 Edison was named the magazine's publisher, and later took control of the editorial side of the magazine as well. As editor and publisher, he caused a furor among staffers by putting Black Sabbath singer Ozzy Osbourne on the cover, and then leaking to the New York Post's Page Six gossip column that thousands of dollars of pot had gone missing from the photo shoot. In November 1999, the magazine held a 25th Anniversary party at Irving Plaza, with performances by Cypress Hill. After taking the magazine to new heights in sales and advertising, Edison was instrumental in producing High Times' first feature film, High Times' Potluck. Edison left High Times in 2001.

In 2000, the magazine established the Stony Awards to recognize and celebrate notable stoner films and television episodes about cannabis. Six High Times Stony Awards ceremonies were held in New York City beginning in 2000, before the Stonys moved to Los Angeles in 2007. Award winners received a bong-shaped trophy. Starting in 2002, the Stonys presented the Thomas King Forçade Award for "stony achievement" in film.

=== Later developments ===
In 2003, Steven Hager was fired, and High Times' board of directors shifted the magazine's focus from marijuana to more literary content, hiring John Buffalo Mailer as executive editor. As a result, the magazine "lost a third of the circulation in nine months." Mailer left the magazine within a year—a succession of editors followed, including David Bienenstock, Rick Cusick, and Steve Bloom.

In 2004, High Times returned to its roots, releasing the CD High Volume: The Stoner Rock Collection. Hager was rehired, first as the creative director, and then in 2006, back to the position of editor-in-chief, but by 2009 he had returned to the role of creative director.

In November 2009, High Times celebrated its 35th anniversary.

In the period 2010–2013, the magazine put out a standalone publication that advocated for medical marijuana.

Hager was again let go by the magazine in 2013, eventually successfully suing High Times for defrauding him of his ownership shares in the company. Hager subsequently released a 20-part series on YouTube, titled The Strategic Meeting, showing the internal machinations inside the company. The video series asserts that Michael Kennedy stole the company from the rightful employees and subverted the original mission for his own private gain.

In October 2014, the magazine celebrated its 40th anniversary with a party attended by celebrities such as Susan Sarandon. In 2014, the High Times website was read by 500,000 to five million users each month.

=== Relocation and sale ===
With the legalization of marijuana in several West Coast states, including California, the magazine announced in January 2017 that it would permanently relocate from New York to Los Angeles.

In the summer of 2017, High Times was sold to a group of investors led by Adam Levin of Oreva Capital for an amount estimated from $42 million to $70 million.

High Times acquired cannabis media company Green Rush Daily, Inc. on April 5, 2018. The deal was valued at $6.9 million. Green Rush Daily founder Scott McGovern joined the magazine as senior executive vice president. Financial difficulties forced the magazine to cease publication in 2024.

Josh Kesselman, founder of RAW, bought the publication for $3.5 million in June 2025, relaunching the podcast as High Times with Josh Kesselman in September.

Josh Kesselman was featured on Forbes’ fifth-annual Cannabis 42.0 list on April 17th 2026, 'celebrating the entrepreneurs, innovators and disruptors who are finding success in the state-regulated cannabis market' for his work as High Times' publisher.

== Columns ==
- "Almost Infamous" by Bobby Black (2004–2016)—lifestyle and entertainment
- “Ask Ed: Your Marijuana Questions Answered" by Ed Rosenthal (1980s–1990s)
- "Brain Damage Report" by Paul Krassner (late 1970s–2000s)
- "Cannabis Column" by Jon Gettman
- "Chef Ra's Psychedelic Kitchen" by Chef Ra (c. 1988–c. 2003)
- "Sex Pot" by Hyapatia Lee (from 2013)
- "The Stoned Gamer" by Alana Evans (from 2014)—gaming
- "Toasted Tweets" by Jessica Delfino (2016)—weekly cannabis-themed Twitter round-up
- "The Stone Cold Cop List" by Jon Cappetta (2020) - monthly collection of newly released products

== Comics ==
By 1976, High Times was publishing comics in its pages, by the likes of underground comix creators such as Gilbert Shelton ("The Fabulous Furry Freak Brothers"), Kim Deitch, Josh Alan and Drew Friedman, Bill Griffith ("Zippy the Pinhead"), Paul Kirchner ("Dope Rider"), Milton Knight ("Zoe"), Spain Rodriguez ("Trashman"), Dave Sheridan, Frank Thorne, and Skip Williamson ("Snappy Sammy Smoot"). Later, artists like Bob Fingerman and Mary Wilshire contributed comics to High Times as well.

== Notable contributors and staff members ==
Andrew Weil was a regular contributor to High Times from 1975 to 1983. For a time, William Levy served as the magazine's European editor.

In 1976, Bruce Eisner became a contributing editor for the magazine. Chip Berlet was the magazine's Washington, D.C. bureau chief in the Seventies. Jeff Goldberg was an editor in 1978–1979.

Kyle Kushman is a former cultivation reporter for High Times and has been a contributing writer for over 20 years.

Peter Gorman (1951–2022) was a writer and editor at High Times for 14 years. He worked there from 1986 to 2000, rising up from senior editor, to executive editor, and then to editor-in-chief. Gorman wrote hundreds of articles for the magazine, particularly in the area of psychedelic drugs. He interviewed figures including Richard Evans Schultes, Albert Hofmann, Alexander Shulgin, and visited the Temple of the True Inner Light. Aside from his work at High Times, Gorman also wrote multiple books, including on psychedelics like ayahuasca and other drugs. He explored the Amazon rainforest and is credited with introducing kambo (sapo) to the Western world.

Bobby Black had a long association with High Times, from 1994 to 2015, including being a senior editor and columnist. His involvement at High Times included production director and associate art director; writing the monthly lifestyle and entertainment column "Almost Infamous"; writing feature articles and interviews; creator and producer of the magazine's annual Miss High Times beauty pageant; producer and host of the annual High Times Doobie Awards for music; lead reporter, judge, and competition coordinator for the Cannabis Cup and the High Times Medical Cannabis Cup; and A&R, producer, liner notes and art director for High Volume: The Stoner Rock Collection CD (High Times Records).

At age 19, Zena Tsarfin started as an intern for the magazine. She later returned to High Times, serving as the magazine's managing editor until 2001 and then again from March 2006 to January 2007. From 2014 to 2016, Tsarfin was High Times' director of digital media.

Danny Danko is the magazine's former Senior Cultivation Editor.

The careers of a number of writers/editors from the comics industry overlapped with High Times, including Tsarfin, Josh Alan Friedman (High Times managing editor, 1983), Lou Stathis (High Times editor, late 1980s), Ann Nocenti (High Times editor, 2004), and most significantly, John Holmstrom, who began to work for the magazine as managing editor in 1987, was soon promoted to executive editor, and in 1991 was promoted to publisher and president. In 1996 he stepped aside to launch and oversee the High Times website, and left the magazine for good in 2000.

Andrew James Parker, a.k.a. Chewberto420, is a cannabis photographer and author, based out of the Western United States (predominantly Huntington Beach, California and Pagosa Springs, Colorado), who has made contributions to the magazine since 2016. Parker is known for his images based in macro photography. He discovered naturally occurring purple hash through experimentation with anthocyanins within cannabis.

== Book publishing ==
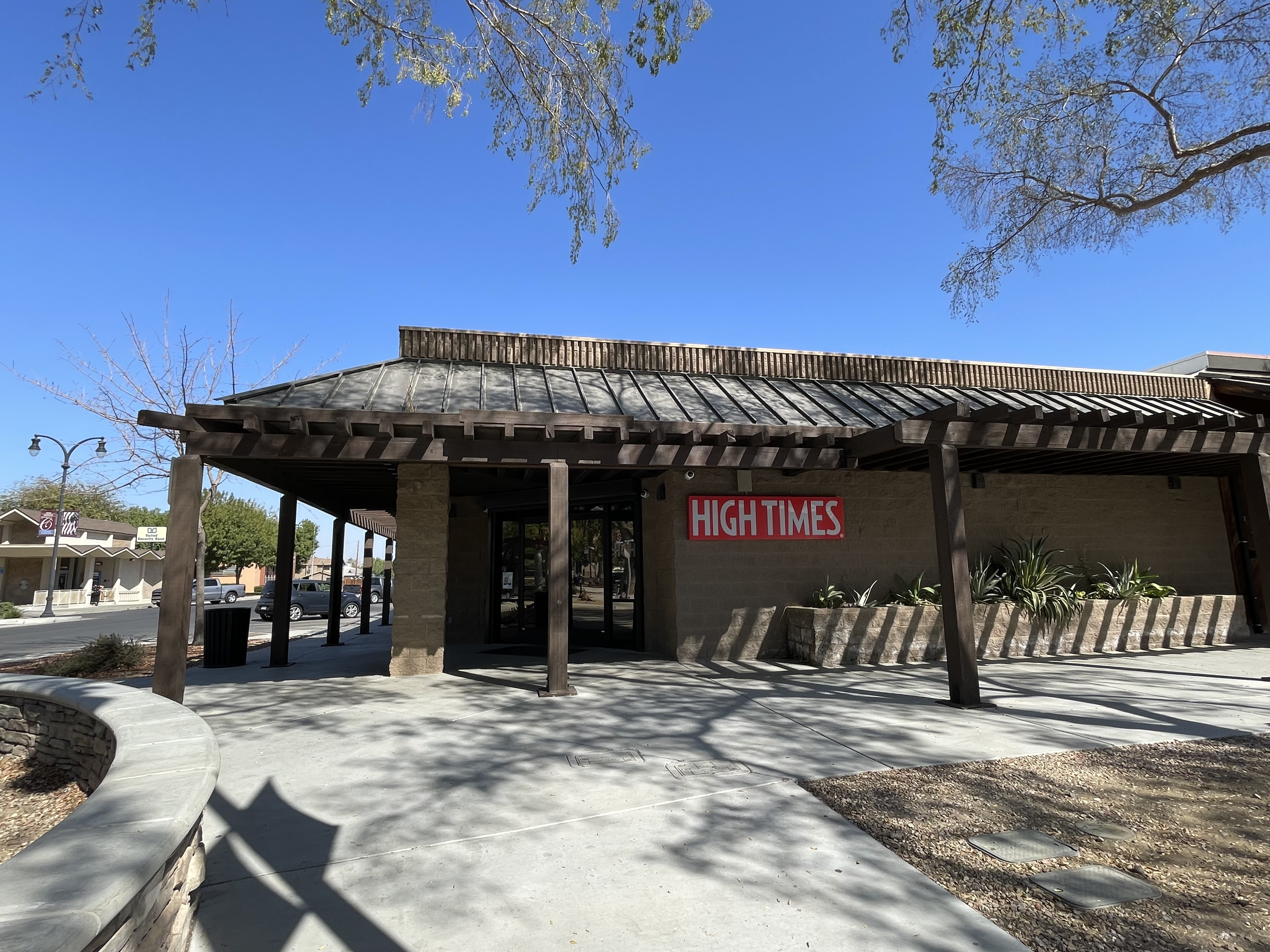
A High Times branded cannabis dispensary in Coalinga, California

- Aldrich, Michael R.; Ashley, Richard; Horowitz, Michael (1978). The High Times Encyclopedia of Recreational Drugs. Stonehill Pub Co. ISBN 0-88373-082-0.
- Bienenstock, David (2008). The Official High Times Pot Smoker's Handbook. High Times Books. ISBN 978-0-8118-6205-9.
- Danko, Danny (2011). The Official High Times Field Guide to Marijuana Strains. High Times Books. ISBN 978-1-893010-28-4.
- Eudaley, Chris (2000). How to Be a Pot Star Like Me: What Every Marijuana Enthusiast Should Know. High Times Books. ISBN 1-893010-06-6.
- Gaskin, Stephen (1998). Hager, Steven (ed.). Cannabis Spirituality: Including 13 Guidelines for Sanity and Safety. High Times Books. ISBN 0-9647858-6-2.
- Hager, Steven (2002). Adventures in the Counterculture: From Hip Hop to High Times. High Times Books. ISBN 1-893010-14-7.
- Krassner, Paul (1999). "Foreword by Harlan Ellison". In Hager, Steven (ed.). Pot Stories for the Soul. High Times Books. ISBN 1-893010-02-3.
- Krassner, Paul (2001). Hager, Steven (ed.). Psychedelic Trips for the Mind. High Times Books. ISBN 1-893010-07-4.
- Lewin, Natasha (2010). The Official High Times Pot Smoker's Activity Book. Chronicle Books. ISBN 978-0-8118-6206-6.
- Nocenti, Annie; Baldwin, Ruth, eds. (2004). The High Times Reader. New York: Nation Books. ISBN 1-56025-624-9.
- Raskin, Jonah (2011). Marijuanaland: Dispatches from an American War. New York: High Times Books. ISBN 978-1-893010-30-7.

== See also ==
- Cannabis Cup
- High Times' Potluck
- Counterculture Hall of Fame
- Stony Awards
- High Times Medical Cannabis Cup
