= Tom Forçade =

American journalist (1945–1978)

- Born: Kenneth Gary Goodson; September 11, 1945; Phoenix, Arizona, U.S.
- Died: November 17, 1978 (aged 33); New York City, U.S.
- Education: University of Utah, 1967
- Occupations: Underground journalist, publisher, activist
- Years active: 1966–1978
- Known for: Underground Press Syndicate; High Times magazine

Thomas King Forçade (born Kenneth Gary Goodson, September 11, 1945 – November 17, 1978) was an American underground journalist and cannabis rights activist in the 1970s. He was the founder of High Times magazine and for many years ran the Underground Press Syndicate (later called the Alternative Press Syndicate)

Forçade published several other publications, such as Stoned, National Weed, Dealer and others, that, veiled as counterculture entertainment magazines, were laced with humor and savvy coverage of politics and popular culture, and served as a forum for some of the industry's best writers and artists. Many of Forçade's publications' writers went on to be published in premiere papers and magazines in North America.

== Life and career ==
Forçade was born as Kenneth Gary Goodson in Phoenix, Arizona on September 11, 1945. He graduated from the University of Utah in 1967 with a degree in business administration. After being quickly discharged from the United States Air Force, Forçade used the skills he learned to traffic drugs across the Mexico–United States border by plane. He used the proceeds to form a hippie commune and underground magazine called Orpheus.

After this, he moved to New York City and officially changed his name to Thomas King Forçade to avoid associating his family name with counterculture and play on the word façade. There. he first took over management of the Underground Press Syndicate, a network of countercultural newspapers and magazines that he helped found. The name was changed to the Alternative Press Syndicate in 1973. Forçade was instrumental in the microfilming of the Underground Newspaper Collection. In 1970, Forçade was the first documented activist to use pieing as a form of protest, hitting Chairman Otto Larsen during the President's Commission on Obscenity and Pornography.

In summer 1974, Forçade founded High Times, and contributed funding to the Yippie newspaper, Yipster Times, while also bankrolling the ailing Punk magazine. High Times ran articles calling marijuana a "medical wonder drug" and ridiculing the US Drug Enforcement Administration. It became a huge success, with a circulation of more than 500,000 copies a month and revenues approaching $10 million by 1977, and was embraced by the young adult market as the bible of the alternative life culture. By 1977 High Times was selling as many copies an issue as Rolling Stone and National Lampoon.

According to the 1990 nonfiction book 12 Days on the Road: The Sex Pistols and America, by Noel E. Monk, Forçade and his film crew followed the Sex Pistols through their chaotic January 1978 concerts of the U.S. South and West, using high-pressure tactics in an unsuccessful attempt to persuade the band's management and record company to let him document the tour.

== Death ==
Forçade died by suicide by gunshot to the head in November 1978 in his Greenwich Village apartment after the death of his best friend, Jack Coombs. Forçade had attempted suicide before and bequeathed trusts to benefit High Times and NORML. High Times' former associate publisher, Rick Cusick, claims that, at Forçade's memorial — held on the roof of the World Trade Center — mourners mixed a small amount of ashes from Forcade's cremation into a marijuana cigarette and they smoked it.
