= Michael John Kennedy =

American criminal defense attorney

Michael Kennedy
- Born: Michael John Kennedy; March 23, 1937; Spokane, Washington, U.S.
- Died: January 25, 2016 (aged 78); Manhattan, New York, U.S.
- Education: University of California, Berkeley (BA); University of California, Hastings (JD)
- Spouse: Eleanora Kennedy
- Children: 3, including Scott

Michael John Kennedy (March 23, 1937 – January 25, 2016) was an American criminal defense attorney, expert in U.S. Constitutional law, and a civil rights advocate who defended cases for the American Civil Liberties Union (ACLU), the Center for Constitutional Rights (CCR), the National Emergency Civil Liberties Committee (NECLC) and in his private practice. Kennedy, who tried cases in 36 states, was a member of the National Lawyers Guild and the State Bar in California and New York.

A trial lawyer for over 50 years, Kennedy was known as an exceptional legal strategist who was a "steadfast defender of the underdog and the First Amendment." Kennedy, who specialized in civil and criminal litigation and complex negotiations, was a guest teacher of trial advocacy at the University of Texas School of Law in Austin, and the Benjamin N. Cardozo School of Law in New York City.

His clients included Huey P. Newton, co-founder of the Black Panther Party; Bernardine Dohrn of the Weather Underground; Cesar Chavez, co-founder of the United Farm Workers; leading advocate for the use of LSD Timothy Leary; members of the Irish Republican Army (IRA); Los Siete de la Raza; and Pablo Guzmán of the Young Lords. While staff at the NECLC Kennedy defended members of the Fort Hood 43 and the late Stanley Neptune, a member of the Penobscot Nation and protester at Wounded Knee.

Kennedy obtained clemency for Jean Harris in 1993. He represented former Sicilian Mafia don Gaetano Badalamenti in the Pizza Connection drug-smuggling case, and Ivana Trump in her contentious divorce with Donald Trump.

== Early life and education ==
Born in Spokane, Washington to Thomas Kennedy and Evelyn (née) Forbes, Kennedy was sent to a Jesuit boarding school when he was four years of age where he remained for over a decade. After high school, Kennedy earned a bachelor's degree from the University of California, Berkeley in 1962, and Juris Doctor from the University of California, Hastings College of the Law in San Francisco, California.

== Career ==
After law school, Kennedy joined a private law firm and began a career as a defense attorney, often pro bono, in many of the country's well-known civil rights cases.

=== Time in the U.S. Army ===
In 1964, Kennedy was first lieutenant in the United States Army, where he was often disciplined for making anti-war speeches while in uniform. At an officers' dinner, Kennedy met Eleanora Baratelli, the woman who would become his life partner. Once he returned to private life, Kennedy's law practice focused on representing draft resistors, conscientious objectors as well as marginalized people and underrepresented groups seeking social justice.

=== Legal career ===
Kennedy's specialty was jury trial work with emphasis on constitutional defenses, including human and civil rights. In the First Amendment area, he was regarded as an authority on the laws of libel and tax fraud defense. Kennedy was considered one of the nation's leading authorities on search and seizure law and the emerging area of privacy rights arising out of the Fourth and Ninth amendments. He also tried many cases involving constitutional issues raised by constitutional due process clauses and Sixth Amendment fair trial concerns and right to counsel. He litigated many constitutional issues by Writ of Habeas Corpus.

Kennedy was admitted to practice in the Supreme Court of the United States and the Court of Appeals for the First, Second, Third, Fourth, Fifth, Ninth and District of Columbia Circuits. He was also admitted to a number of United States District Courts. Kennedy, and colleague Michael Tigar, put on many provocative programs for the Litigation Section of the American Bar Association (ABA), including a death penalty case at Alcatraz Federal Penitentiary, an Israeli/Palestinian mock arbitration about sovereignty and human rights in Gaza and the West Bank, and a much-heralded international tribunal investigating war crimes in Bosnia.

== Notable civil rights cases and clients ==
Michael Kennedy played a central role in the nationwide protests against the United States involvement in the Vietnam War. A new breed of radical attorneys were emerging on the legal scene, which included Kennedy and other contemporaries such as Charles Garry, Michael Tigar, William Kunstler, Michael Ratner, Leonard Boudin, Michael Standard, Victor Rabinowitz, and Charles Nesson who worked on pro bono cases as often as not. Kennedy moved to New York in the late 1960s to take the position of staff counsel of the National Emergency Civil Liberties Committee, which until 1968 was known as the Emergency Civil Liberties Committee.

=== 1960s ===
==== United Farm Workers and Cesar Chavez ====
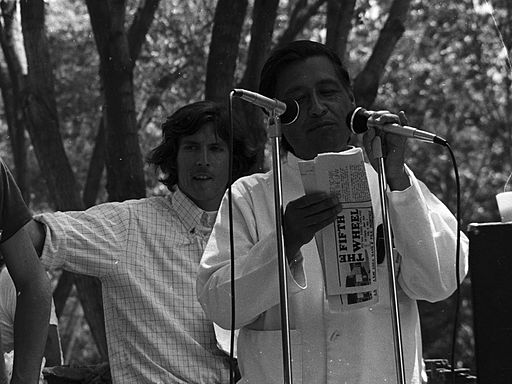
Cesar Chavez speaking at Delano grape strike, Sept. 1965

Working on behalf of the NECLC Kennedy represented labor leader Cesar Chavez, who along with Dolores Huerta, co-founded the mostly Latino National Farm Workers Association (NFWA), which was later renamed as United Farm Workers. Kennedy defended Chavez and migrant farm workers in their protest against exorbitant rents and subpar living conditions. Shortly thereafter, Kennedy got involved in the successful 1965 strike against the Great Atlantic & Pacific Tea Company (A&P) for selling non-union grapes and lettuce. The five-year boycott, which became known as the Delano grape strike, prompted an international boycott of grapes. The strike, initially organized by the predominantly Filipino AFL–CIO-affiliated Agricultural Workers Organizing Committee, led to the creation of the United Farm Workers of America, the first union representing farm workers in the United States.

==== Fort Hood 43 ====
A group of African American GIs who recently returned from Vietnam were ordered to serve on riot-control duty at the 1968 Democratic National Convention in Chicago, Illinois where protests were anticipated in response to the recent assassination of Martin Luther King Jr. The servicemen refused to serve and were consequently court-martialed. Kennedy successfully represented the group, which became known as the Fort Hood 43. One of Kennedy's clients, the decorated Sgt. Robert D. Rucker, later became an attorney then went on to become the second African American to serve as Judge on the Illinois Supreme Court and the first African American to serve on the Indiana Court of Appeals.

==== The 1968 Democratic Convention and The Chicago Seven ====
The Chicago Seven were charged with conspiracy to incite riots at the 1968 Democratic National Convention. While defending Rennie Davis, Kennedy and three other lawyers - Gerald B. Lefcourt, Michael Tigar and Dennis Roberts - were briefly jailed for contempt of court by presiding Judge Julius Hoffman. Attorney William Kunstler, at the time with the Center for Constitutional Rights, was also cited for contempt though all the convictions were overturned unanimously by the Seventh Circuit. Some thirty attorneys in San Francisco protested Hoffman's punitive decision by burning their Bar Association cards on the steps of the federal building. By the end of the five-month trial, referred to as one of the "most bizarre courtroom spectacles in U.S. history" by the Washington Post, Judge Hoffman had issued over 200 citations for contempt of court against the defendants and their attorneys. All seven defendants - Abbie Hoffman, Jerry Rubin, David Dellinger, Tom Hayden, Rennie Davis, John Froines, and Lee Weiner - were acquitted on riot conspiracy charges, though found guilty of intent to riot.

==== House Un-American Activities Committee ====
Shortly after the 1968 Democratic Convention, Tom Hayden, Rennie Davis, Abbie Hoffman, Jerry Rubin, Dave Dellinger and Robert Greenblatt received subpoenas to appear before the House Un-American Activities Committee (HUAC). Michael Kennedy was among the group's six defense attorneys. The HUAC hearings were viewed by the NECLC as an "attempt by the Johnson administration to use every mechanism at its disposal to legitimize the action of Mayor [Richard) Daley and the Chicago police," and the violence they displayed against protesters during the 1968 DNC. Daley had ordered the entire Chicago police force of 12,000 men to work 12-hour shifts and called in over 5,000 National Guardsmen in addition to some 1,000 Secret Service and FBI agents who were also on duty.

On the opening day of the HUAC hearings, the subpoenaed men and their lawyers, including Kennedy and William Kunstler, staged a "stand-in" to protest the investigations. "The Constitution is being raped and we as lawyers are being emasculated in an armed camp," Kennedy shouted at the hearing.

==== Los Siete de la Raza ====
Michael Kennedy, along with co-counsel Charles Garry, defended a group of seven young Hispanic men in San Francisco's Mission District who, while moving a television set into a friend's home in May 1969, were stopped by two plain clothes policemen and asked for their ID cards. An altercation ensued between the young men and police officers Joseph Brodnik and Paul McGoran. In the scuffle, a gun was fired, killing one of the police officers. According to a New York Times account of the shooting, "about the only evidence that is not disputed is that the bullet that killed the policeman, Patrolman Joseph Brodnik, was fired from the gun of his partner, Patrolman Paul McGoran, at a distance of about two inches." During the scuffle, McGoran called the youths "wetbacks."

It was revealed during the much publicized trial that Brodnik had harassed the same young men previously, had 38 counts of police brutality and 4 counts of brandishing a gun in past skirmishes, and was known as a racist. Kennedy and the other defense attorneys proved that Brodnik's partner Paul McGoran had accidentally fired the shot that killed him. After the stormy four-month trial, which had become a cause célèbre in the Latin-American community and the New Left, the young men - Gary Lescallett, Rodolfo Antonio Martinez, Mario Martinez, Jose Rios, Nelson Rodriguez, and Danilo Melendez - were acquitted and freed. The seventh defendant, George Lopez, was never apprehended.

==== Columbia University protests of 1968 ====
Kennedy represented Columbia Law students who tried to shut down the law school in protest of the Vietnam War. Disciplinary hearings were held to expel them. Kennedy represented the students, including Gus Reichbach and Eleanor Stein, who were charged with violating campus rules. Ultimately, charges were dismissed. Stein and Reichbach both went on to become attorneys, then judges.

==== 1960s gay liberation movement ====
The Committee for Homosexual Freedom (CHF) was a gay and lesbian rights organization founded in San Francisco in April 1969 by gay activists Leo E. Laurence and Gayle Whittington. Both were fired by their employers (respectively, ABC Radio and freight company, State Steamship Line) after a photo of them embracing was published by the countercultural newspaper the Berkeley Barb. Laurence said he was fired by ABC for his "radical politics, revolutionary writings, and strong union activities." Kennedy defended Laurence's case on the basis of what Laurence referred to as "ABC's unwritten discrimination against homosexuals; an attack on freedom of speech and press."

=== 1970s ===
Kennedy defended numerous conscientious objectors and draft resistors at the height of the Vietnam War. Some draft protesters chose prison over fighting in what they regarded as an immoral and unjust war. Others opted to go to Canada where they were welcomed. Vietnam deserters got as far as Sweden, to where Kennedy traveled to represent persons sought for extradition by the United States.

==== Andy Stapp and Dennis Ciesielski ====
Kennedy defended Andy Stapp, an anti-war activist who had formed the American Servicemen's Union, an unofficial union for US military members who opposed the Vietnam War.

In 1968 Kennedy tried the case of Dennis Ciesielski, the first US sailor to refuse orders to serve in Vietnam. Ciesielski, charged with desertion, was convicted of a lesser offense.

==== The Buffalo Nine ====
The Buffalo Nine comprised a group of students associated with State University of New York at Buffalo who sought sanctuary in a Unitarian Universalist church in Buffalo, New York. When US Marshals, FBI agents and the Buffalo Police stormed the church with blackjacks, Bruce Beyer - leader of the Buffalo Draft Resistance Union - was arrested along with eight others for evading the draft and assaulting an officer. Their arrest drew national attention. Kennedy, then staff counsel with the NECLC, along with former US Attorney General Ramsey Clark, represented members of the group that became known as Buffalo Nine. Beyer, who faced considerable jail time, jumped bail and fled to Canada then eventually made his way to Sweden, where he was granted humanitarian asylum.

==== Fort Hood and US Army marijuana possession case ====
The United States military reported that at the height of the Vietnam War, over half of all troops on tour in Vietnam were consuming marijuana. Many didn't stop after they came home. Returning soldiers smoked so much cannabis that the Texas military post, Fort Hood, became known as "Fort Head."

Michael Kennedy's first marijuana case, also the first of its kind in the U.S. military, involved Pfc. Bruce "Gypsy" Peterson who opposed the war on humanitarian grounds and started an underground GI newspaper Fatigue Press at Fort Hood. Peterson also organized anti-war protests for soldiers and civilians. In 1968, while leaving a GI coffee house in Killeen, Texas, local police arrested Peterson on suspicion of drug possession. They turned him over to military authorities at Fort Hood who found such a minuscule amount of marijuana in the lint of his pockets that it was destroyed in the process of analyzing it. Still, Peterson was convicted and sentenced to eight years of hard labor at the Leavenworth military prison. After Peterson served two years, Kennedy, working with the NECLC, got involved in Peterson's appeal. Kennedy managed to get Peterson's conviction overturned on the grounds that the search was illegal, due process had been violated, and that an 8-year sentence for an immeasurable amount of cannabis residue was cruel and unusual punishment. Peterson's case was not only Kennedy's first pot case, but also the first marijuana prosecution case in the history of the U.S. military.

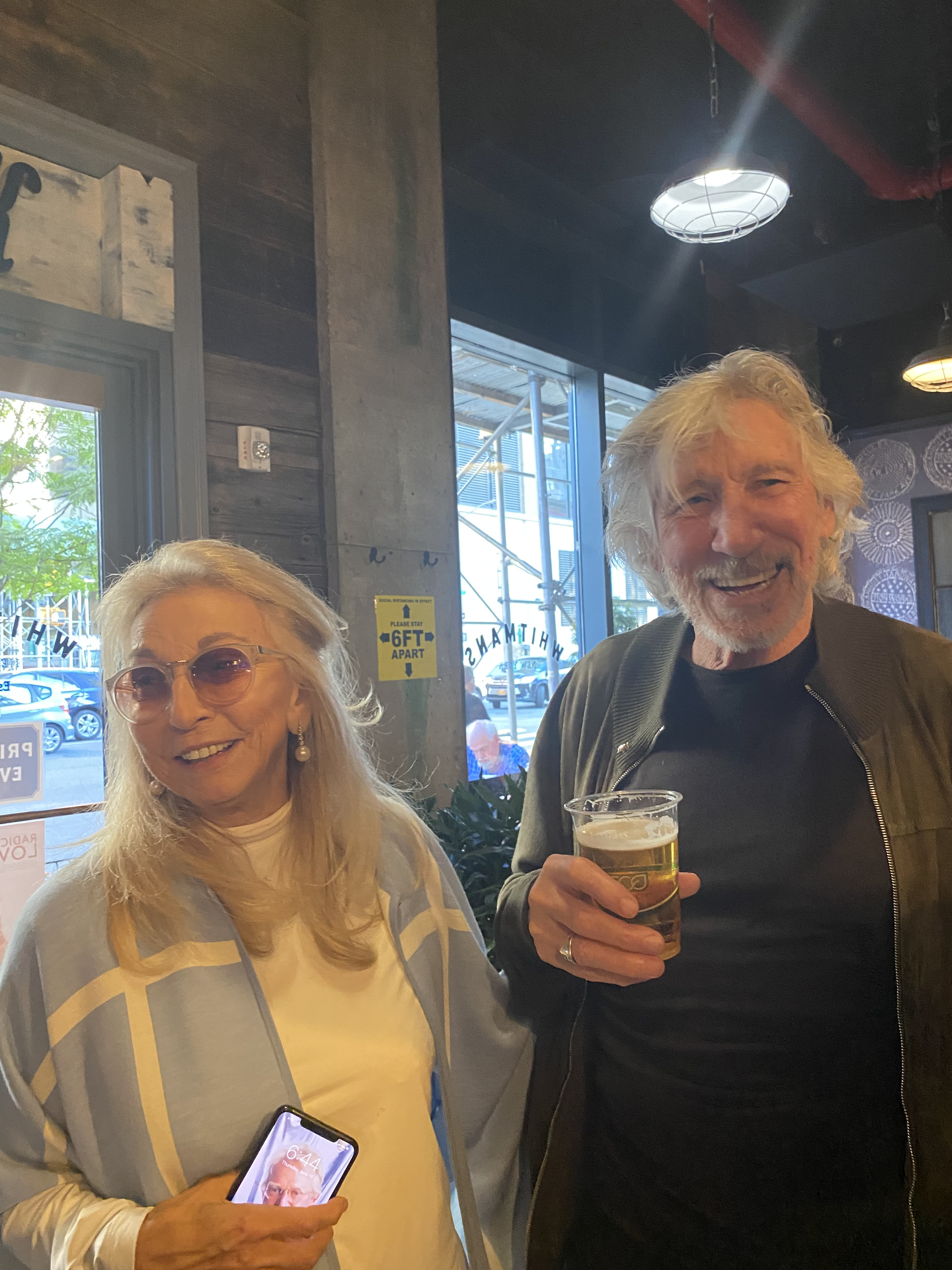
Eleanora Kennedy and Roger Waters at world premiere of Radical Love at Tribeca Film Festival 2021. Waters, friend of Kennedy, was supporter of the documentary.

==== Puerto Rican Vietnam War draft resisters ====
In the first case of its kind in San Juan, Puerto Rico's Federal Court, Kennedy represented Edwin Feliciano Grafals, a self-described, non-religious conscientious objector, who was studying math and science at the university when he was drafted into the US military. A member of the Movimiento Pro-Independencia de Puerto Rico (MPI), Grafals objected to being drafted and condemned American aggression in Vietnam. Grafals and other Puerto Ricans took issue with forced induction into the U.S. Armed Forces, arguing that Puerto Ricans had no allegiance to, nor received any benefits from, the United States. As an unincorporated territory, Puerto Rico has no US voting rights, no representation in the US Congress and is not entitled to electoral votes in presidential elections. Kennedy, at the time a teacher at Rutgers Law School, moved to Puerto Rico with his wife Eleanora Kennedy to represent Grafals and to train Puerto Rican attorneys in the event there was another similar anti-draft case. However, the Grafals case, for which two U.S. prosecutors were appointed and flown to Puerto Rico, was the last of its kind. Ultimately, presiding Judge Hiram Rafael Cancio ruled in favor of Kennedy's client. Judge Cancio noted in his opinion, issued on January 23, 1970, with regard to Grafals: "You believe, for the same reasons, with the same conviction and just as honestly, that the Military Selective Service Act is not constitutional nor valid, insofar as it applies to Puerto Ricans, who were not represented with a voice and vote in the legislative body which approved it. Your conscience does not permit you to serve compulsorily in the United States Armed Forces, regardless of how justified or unjustified are the wars this nation is engaged in."

==== H. Bruce Franklin, Freedom of Speech, Stanford University and William Shockley ====
H. Bruce Franklin, a Stanford professor, renowned Herman Melville scholar and outspoken critic of the Vietnam War was fired from Stanford University in 1972 for allegedly urging protestors to riot, "resist police efforts" and to make "people's war" against the university. Stanford University's president and advisory board had proposed dismissal. But Franklin, a self-proclaimed revolutionary with a sizable campus movement behind him, elected to have a public hearing. He chose Michael Kennedy as his counsel. Franklin and Kennedy argued that the professor's actions involved constitutionally protected free speech but the university prevailed and recommended serious penalty, short of dismissal. At that time, the ACLU got involved and took Franklin's case into the courts where, after eight years of decision and appeal, the case was decided in the university's favor.

==== William Shockley on race and eugenics challenged ====
Dr. William B. Shockley of Stanford University, a co-recipient of the Nobel Prize in physics and considered by colleagues to be a genius, evoked controversy and considerable hostility for his insistent views that blacks were genetically inferior to whites and scored lower on intelligence quotient tests as a result of heredity. He also opined that people on welfare should be sterilized.

Shockley's views prompted not only Stanford students but students around the country to protest his lectures. In January 1972, a group of approximately 16 Stanford students and non-students entered his classroom where he was giving a quiz. The students challenged him to a debate. Shockley declined and called campus police who removed the students who were later expelled by Stanford University authorities. Kennedy represented several of the students in court but ultimately the university prevailed. The students, some of whom were months from graduating, remained expelled and Shockley continued teaching at Stanford though his lecture circuit was deeply curtailed as hundreds of students and individuals around the country showed up to protest his racist views.

==== Timothy Leary ====
Timothy Leary, former Harvard University psychologist known for his exploration of psychedelic drugs and being referred to as the "most dangerous man in America" by President Richard Nixon, was arrested in 1970 for possession of two cannabis joints. He was sentenced to 10 years and imprisoned in the California Men's Colony in San Luis Obispo, California. Leary hired Kennedy to appeal his sentence. When the appeal was rejected, allegedly Kennedy planned to break Leary out of prison with the help of the Weather Underground and the Brotherhood of Eternal Love.

Once Leary was free, he fled to Algiers where Eldridge Cleaver and the Black Panther Party received him for a short time until he made his way to Switzerland and then Afghanistan where he was captured in 1973 and returned to the United States.

When investigated by the FBI, Leary accused Kennedy of masterminding his prison escape. As a result, Kennedy faced disbarment, but the FBI was unable to prove Leary's accusations and the charges against Kennedy were eventually dropped.

==== Michael Randall of the Brotherhood of Eternal Love and the Orange Sunshine LSD ====
Kennedy represented Michael Randall, co-founder of the Brotherhood of Eternal Love. One of the Brotherhood's utopian plans was to cheaply mass-produce LSD and distribute it to everyone who wanted it. To make "so much Orange Sunshine that it would become virtually free. We had a deep spiritual commitment to what we were doing," Randall said.

==== Bernadine Dohrn ====
Among the original members of the Weather Underground, classified by the FBI as a domestic terrorist group, was Bernardine Dohrn who went into hiding in 1969. She was subsequently placed on the FBI's Most Wanted List when she jumped bail after being charged with two counts of aggravated battery, stemming from the Days of Rage and other protests. After 11 years on the run with her husband Bill Ayers and their three sons, Dohrn resurfaced with the assistance of Michael Kennedy and his wife Eleanora Kennedy who helped plan Dohrn and her family's safe return to open society.

Once she turned herself in, Dohrn was called to testify before the Grand Jury against ex-Weatherman Susan Rosenberg. Dohrn refused and was held in contempt of a grand jury and served 7 months in prison.

==== The Mitchell Brothers: Behind the Green Door ====
The Mitchell brothers, Jim and Artie Mitchell, owners of pornography and strip clubs in California from 1969 until 1991, produced and directed many adult films, including Behind the Green Door in 1972. The film starred the legendary adult movie actress, Marilyn Chambers, who started her career as the wholesome model on Ivory Snow detergent boxes in the early 1970s. Behind the Green Door played to regular crowds in the Mitchell brothers' club, the O'Farrell Theater in the Tenderloin district of San Francisco, until Jim Farrell was arrested for production and exhibition of "obscene material."

The Mitchell brothers hired Kennedy to defend them against the obscenity charges. Kennedy utilized the First Amendment to successfully defend the brothers who continued to show their films, even while being arrested dozens of times over the coming year.

==== Murder of Artie Mitchell and trial ====
In 1992, Kennedy defended Jim Mitchell in San Francisco on the charge of murdering his brother, Artie. The trial involved some of the most modern and sophisticated technology, including the first use of 3D computer animation, in a criminal case. Mitchell was found not guilty of the murder charge. He was convicted of a lesser charge of manslaughter.

==== Black Panther Party, Huey Newton mistrial ====
Kennedy defended Black Panther Party leader Huey P. Newton, who was accused of killing a 17-year-old prostitute in August 1974. The trial ended in a mistrial with the jurors deadlocked 10 to 2 for acquittal. Newton was also accused of assaulting a tailor.

Newton, a revolutionary political activist, along with fellow Merritt College student Bobby Seale, founded the Black Panther Party in 1966 in the wake of assassination of black nationalist Malcolm X and the fatal shooting of an unarmed black teen named Matthew Johnson by the police in San Francisco. The police shooting of Johnson sparked the Hunters Point Uprising.

=== 1980s–1990s ===
==== The Pizza Connection ====
The so-called Pizza Connection Trial, a criminal trial against Sicilian and American Mafias, was centered on a number of independently owned pizza parlors in New York that were allegedly being used as fronts for trafficking heroin from Southwest Asia to the United States. Michael Kennedy represented Gaetano Badalamenti, who was a capofamiglia (crime boss) in his hometown Cinisi, Sicily and former top boss of the Sicilian Mafia.

The trial, the longest in the judicial history of the United States, lasted from September 30, 1985, to March 2, 1987, ending with 17 convictions handed down on June 22, 1987. The prosecutor in the Pizza Connection case was Rudolph Giuliani.

Badalamenti, known as capo dei capi (boss of bosses), was considered one of the most-wanted fugitives in the world until his arrest in Madrid in 1984, after which he was extradited to the United States. Following his conviction in 1987, Badalamenti was sent to prison then later to the Federal Medical Center in Ayer, Massachusetts where he died in May 2004.

==== Irish Republican Army gunrunners ====
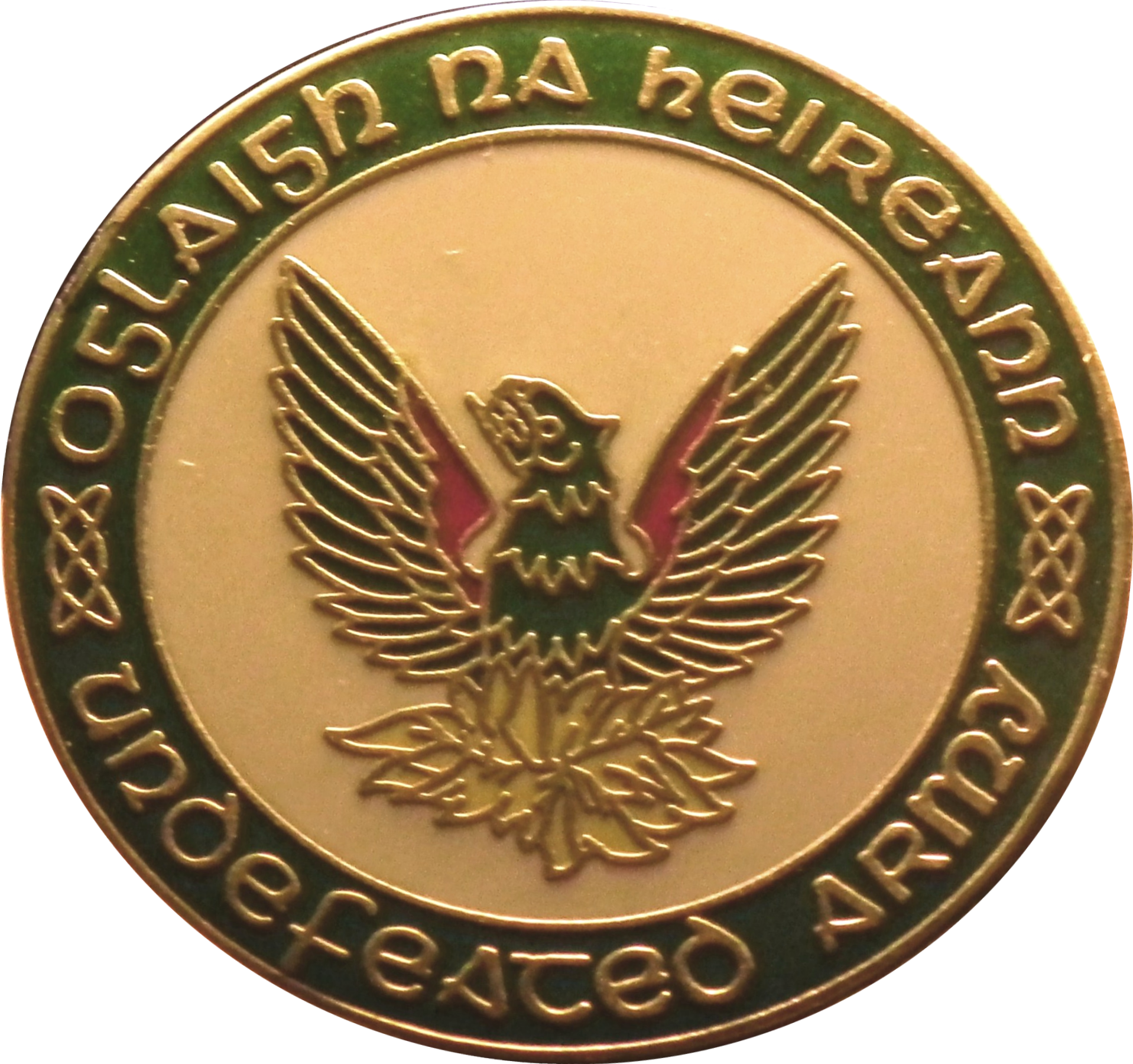
Irish Republican Army badge from Sinn Fein bookshop

When five Irish men in New York were charged with conspiring to smuggle weapons to the Irish Republican Army (IRA), Michael Kennedy and a team of six attorneys, including renowned Irish-American lawyer Frank Durkan, won an acquittal for them in Federal Court in Brooklyn, New York on Nov. 5, 1982. The legal team's defense showed that the US Central Intelligence Agency (CIA) had been involved in the IRA gunrunning operation for a period of years. This defense was presented to the jury when one of the main IRA weapons suppliers, George de Meo, formerly regarded as trustworthy by the IRA, was found out to be an undercover CIA agent. With a license to legally export weapons, the CIA was aiding the IRA's gun running operation in order to monitor the flow of arms to Ireland and prevent the IRA from turning to the Soviet Union for weapons, Kennedy's legal team argued. The jury agreed. All five IRA defendants, George Harrison, Michael Flannery, Thomas Falvey, Patrick Mullin, and Daniel Gormley were acquitted and walked free after the 7-week trial.

The CIA had remained silent about the gun running scheme until 2017 when declassified information was uncovered by freedom of information campaigners that showed the accusations to be true. A lawsuit against the CIA finally culminated in the agency releasing the archive, which had previously only been accessible at the through the National Archives and Records Administration

==== Iran–Contra affair ====
When convicted Iran-Contra conspirator Richard Secord brought a $36 million libel suit against Leslie Cockburn and Andrew Cockburn for their book, "Out of Control," the Cockburns hired Kennedy. After two years of court battles, Kennedy got Secord's libel lawsuit dismissed.

==== Jean S. Harris ====
In January 1993, Kennedy won clemency for Jean S. Harris, who was convicted for the murder of her ex-lover Herman Tarnower, a well-known cardiologist and author of The Complete Scarsdale Medical Diet.

==== Waco Whistleblower ====
Kennedy represented former assistant U.S. Attorney William Johnston, the so-called Waco whistle-blower, who sparked a probe into whether the federal government was responsible for the deaths of 74 Branch Davidians during the 1993 siege of their compound near Waco, Texas. Johnston had been indicted and charged with two counts of obstruction of justice and three counts of lying to investigators and a federal grand jury.

==== Dr. Mousa Abu Marzook – Palestine ====
Gaza-born Dr. Mousa Abu Marzook, a legal resident of the United States since 1982 and whose four out of six children are American-born citizens, was arrested at New York's JFK airport in July 1995. Never charged with a crime in the United States, Abu Marzook, a member of the Hamas Political Bureau and a US educated industrial engineer, was detained on the basis that Israel had sought his extradition on what turned out to be spurious allegations of terrorism, which were never proven. Though his incarceration and detention were illegal in that he had broken no U.S. laws, Abu Marzook was held in New York's Metropolitan Correctional Center for two years. Noting that Abu Marzook's constitutional right to a speedy trial had long since lapsed, Kennedy contacted the Israeli authorities on his client's behalf, stating that Abu Marzook was prepared to travel immediately to Israel to stand trial. Israel declined and withdrew its bid to extradite Abu Marzook. "Essentially, he called their bluff and said: 'You want me? Take me,'" Kennedy said. "And Israel said, 'we don't want you.'"

Kennedy noted that Israel had a weak case against Abu Marzook because it was based on statements by a Palestinian who subsequently recanted, saying he had been tortured by Israeli interrogators and was forced to sign a confession in Hebrew, a language he did not understand. Israel, Kennedy noted, also acted out of fear that it would lose a high-profile case.

Once Israel suspended Abu Marzook's extradition request, the United States found itself in a difficult position regarding Abu Marzook who admittedly did not present a national security risk and had broken no U.S. laws. Kennedy worked out a deal with Jordan's King Hussein to receive Abu Marzook on humanitarian grounds.

==== Susan McDougal – Whitewater ====
In 1996, Susan McDougal was arrested for refusing to give evidence to the Whitewater Special Counsel brought by independent counsel Ken Starr. When McDougal refused to testify against her business partner at the time, former President Bill Clinton then governor of Arkansas, she was incarcerated in a solitary cell for much of her 18 months of confinement until Kennedy helped secure her release in June 1998.

==== Nicaragua and the Sandinistas ====
Kennedy opposed American intervention in Nicaragua and US military and financial support for the Contras who were fighting to overthrow the leftist Sandinista government. Kennedy was a legal advisor, friend, and supporter of the Sandinistas and the Nicaraguan people. Kennedy was arrested and jailed in New York on several occasions while protesting against the U.S. funded Contra war against the Sandinistas.

==== Nicaragua vs. U.S. - International Court of Justice ====
Kennedy served as a legal advisor in Nicaragua's successful court case, The Republic of Nicaragua v. The United States of America, which was heard in 1986 before the International Court of Justice (ICJ). The ruling Sandinista government had accused the United States of violating international law by supporting the Contras' violent actions against their government, which included mining Nicaragua's ports. The ICJ ruled that U.S. support for the Contras was illegal, and demanded that the United States pay reparations to the Nicaraguan government. The ICJ stated in its verdict that US training and financing of the anti-Sandinista Contras, the October 1983 attack on Puerto Sandino and interference with maritime commerce constituted breaches of international law.

==== Northern Ireland Peace Accords ====
Kennedy was involved in encouraging US government officials and other influential individuals to travel to Northern Ireland during peace negotiations with the British government that ultimately resulted in the Good Friday Agreement (GFA) on April 10, 1998. Also known as the Belfast Agreement, the GFA was ratified in both Ireland and Northern Ireland by popular vote on May 22, 1998. The GFA helped end more than 30 years of armed conflict known as The Troubles.

Kennedy and his wife Eleanora took the former US Senator Robert Torricelli and Bianca Jagger to Belfast, Northern Ireland where they met, among other stakeholders, Gerry Adams, then one of the leaders of the Irish Republican Army and later president of its political wing Sinn Féin.

==== United Nations ====
Kennedy and wife Eleanora served as special advisors to the 2008-2009 United Nations General Assembly President, Father Miguel D'Escoto Brockmann, who was the former Nicaraguan Foreign Minister. Kennedy also advised the United Nations Office on Drugs and Crime.

== Influence in American cannabis culture ==
As a proponent of decriminalizing and legalizing cannabis, Michael Kennedy was influential in raising awareness around marijuana's medical benefits as well as its benign effects as compared to alcohol and other drugs.

=== High Times Magazine – The War on Drugs ===
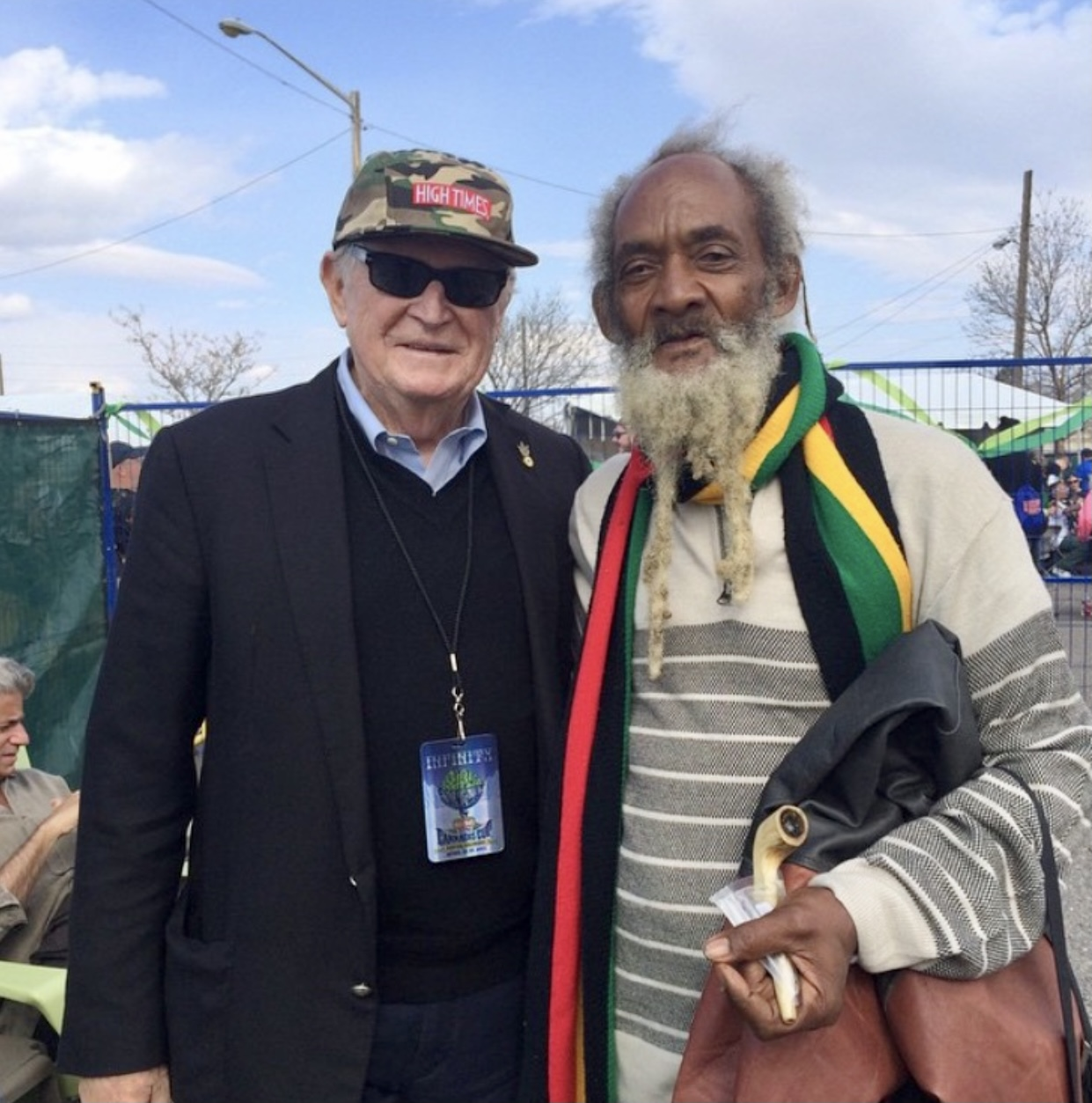
Michael Kennedy with Jamaican ganja advocate and defender of Human Rights, Ras Iya V Rastafarian, in New York - taken by Eleanora Kennedy, permission for use granted.

Kennedy served as the General Counsel and Chairman of the Board for High Times Magazine for over 40 years until his death when his wife and board member, Eleanora Kennedy, took the reins. During their four decades at High Times following the death of its founder Tom Forçade in 1978, the Kennedys and the magazine's staff consistently struggled against marijuana prohibition laws and fought to keep the magazine alive and publishing in an anti-cannabis atmosphere.

The magazine's former associate publisher, Rick Cusick, said the only way High Times managed to stay in business and never miss a publication date for over four decades was "Really, really good lawyers even though everybody knew I was talking about just one - Michael Kennedy."

The Kennedys, High Times magazine and its staff were supporters of the National Organization for the Reform of Marijuana Laws (NORML) since the organization's founding by attorney Keith Stroup in 1970. Kennedy and Stroup maintained a lifelong friendship, connected by their struggle to legalize marijuana and end the war on drugs. Kennedy was named a "420 Icon" by the Cannabis Business Awards on April 20, 2020 for his contribution to cannabis history and culture.

=== Pot prisoners ===
In 2012, Kennedy, his law partner David C. Holland, former High Times editor-in-chief Chris Simunek and Beth Curtis, founder of the website lifeforpot.com, initiated a project to convince US authorities to spare five elderly, non-violent marijuana prisoners "the indignity of dying in prison for the supposed crime of conspiring to distribute large amounts of marijuana to the citizens of the United States of America." Kennedy and Holland wrote the petition and presented it to President Barack Obama for executive clemency on behalf of the five men. As of mid-2020, four of the five elderly "pot prisoners" had been released. On January 19, 2021, in a series of last minute pardons and clemencies issued by outgoing President Donald Trump, John Knock was freed after having served 26 year in federal prison.

=== Rescheduling cannabis – The White Paper ===
In November 2014, Kennedy and Jon Gettman, former director of NORML and Coalition for Rescheduling Cannabis, co-wrote a widely distributed article titled "Let it grow - the open market solution to marijuana control" presenting the case for "legalizing marijuana by way of a wide-open commercial, competitive market including the allowance of small-scale cultivation for personal use."

== Legacy and media appearances ==
=== NORML's Michael J. Kennedy Social Justice Award ===
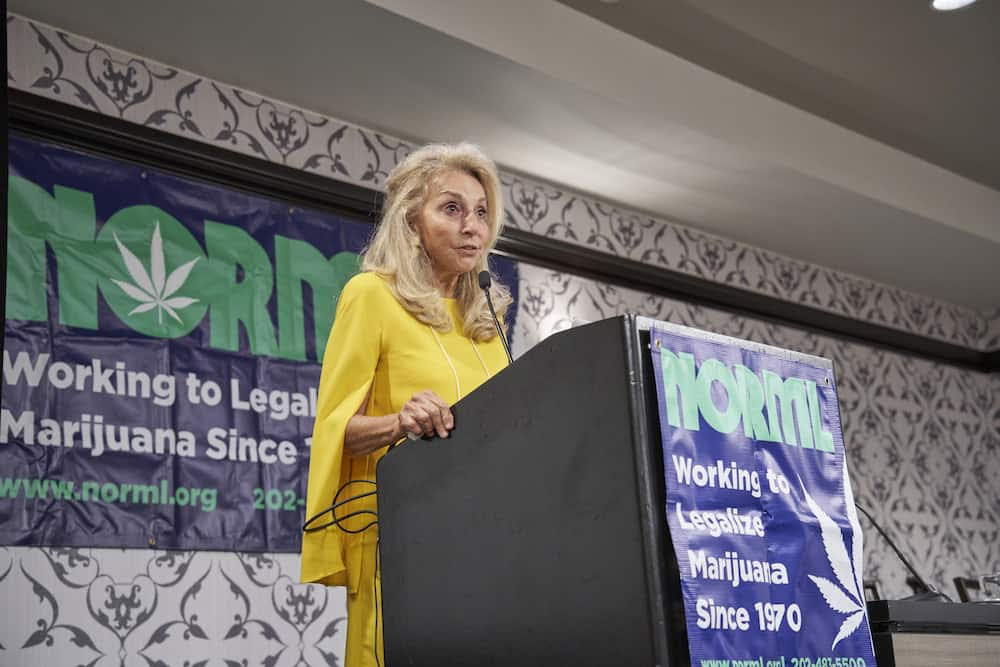
Eleanora Kennedy introducing recipient of NORML's 2019 Michael J. Kennedy Social Justice Award. Photo courtesy of NORML, permission granted

The Michael J. Kennedy Social Justice Award was set up by NORML with the blessing of his wife Eleanora and daughter Anna Kennedy. The first recipient of the award in May 2016 was long-time NORML activist and criminal defense attorney Gerald H. Goldstein, The 2018 award went to longtime Kennedy friend and colleague, Michael E. Tigar, acclaimed litigator and renowned constitutional lawyer. In 2019, the Award went to activist Bernardine Dohrn and was presented by rock star Tom Morello of Rage Against the Machine. Recipient of the Michael J. Kennedy Social Justice Award will be given to the late Dr. Lester Grinspoon (June 24, 1928 – June 25, 2020). A Harvard Medical School psychiatrist and associate professor, Dr. Grinspoon became a leading proponent of cannabis legalization after his research found that it was less toxic and less addictive than alcohol or tobacco.

=== Radical Love ===
Film director William A. Kirkley met Michael Kennedy at his home in New York City in January 2016. Kirkley was seeking a short interview with Kennedy to complete his recent movie, Orange Sunshine, a documentary about the Brotherhood of Eternal Love. Kirkley had intended to speak to Kennedy about his role as the attorney to the Brotherhood of Eternal Love. Kirkley ended up spending several hours filming a long conversation with Kennedy, which turned out to be his last public interview. Kennedy passed away three weeks later.

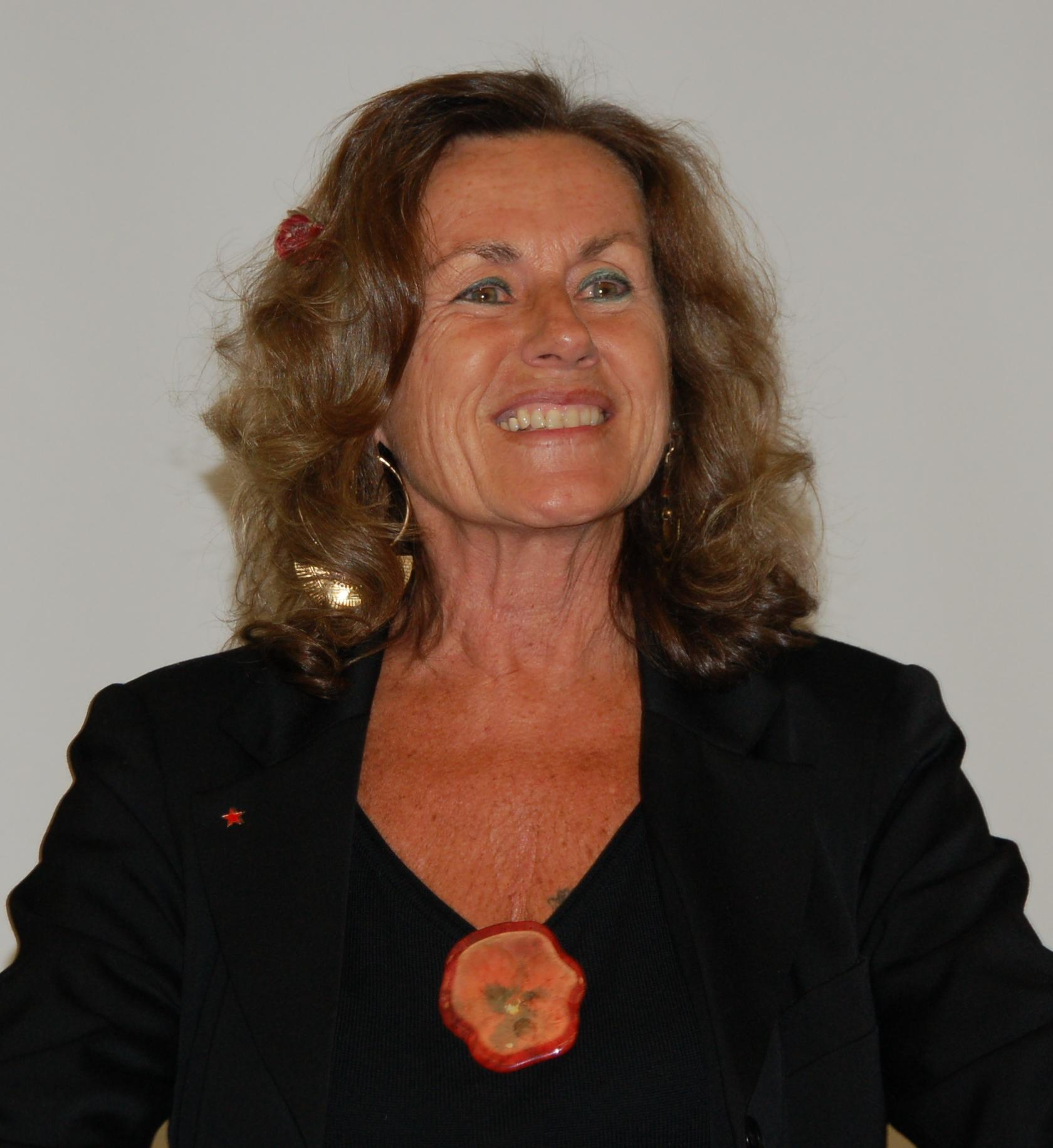
Bernardine Dohrn 2018. Photo by Thomas Good/ Wikimedia Commons

Inspired by Kennedy's story, Kirkley used the interview to begin another documentary, Radical Love, about Michael Kennedy's vast legal work in the area of civil rights defense. Woven into the political documentary is the unique love story of Kennedy and his wife and comrade of 47 years, Eleanora. The film also includes significant interviews with two Weathermen, Bernardine Dohrn and her husband Bill Ayers.

The film's producer is Caroline Waterlow, best known for her Oscar-winning documentary O.J.: Made in America.

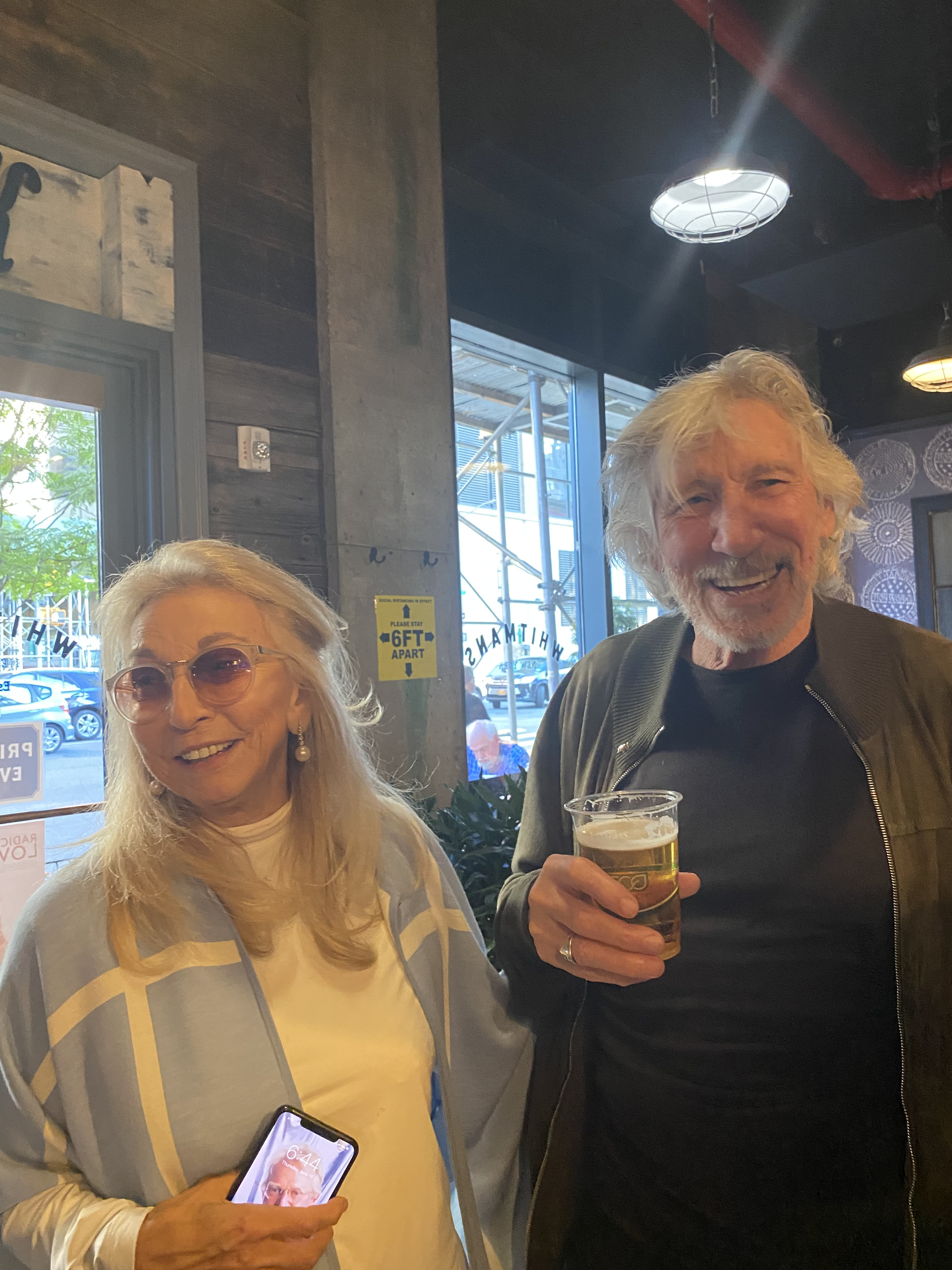
Eleanora Kennedy and Roger Waters at world premiere of Radical Love at Tribeca Film Festival 2021. Waters, friend of Kennedy, was supporter of the documentary.

Radical Love had its world premiere at the Tribeca Film Festival in New York City in June 2021. The film was chosen for competition in the Short Documentary category.

Radical Love had been scheduled to premiere at South by Southwest in 2020 until the COVID-19 pandemic forced the closure of the festival.

=== Media appearances and New York Public Library ===
When making the 1990 film, Presumed Innocent, director Alan J. Pakula needed a professional for actor Raúl Juliá to speak with and observe as an experienced trial lawyer, Michael Kennedy was selected.

Along with eleven of New York's most powerful attorneys, Kennedy performed in a production of Twelve Angry Men as a benefit to raise scholarship funds for Legal Aid attorneys. The production was directed by Toni Kotite.

Michael Kennedy's papers and documents are stored at the New York Public Library's Manuscripts and Archives division.

== Personal life ==
Michael Kennedy was married to Eleanora (née Baratelli) Kennedy for over four decades. Together they have a daughter, Anna Kennedy. Kennedy also has two children from a former marriage: Lisa Marie Kennedy and Scott Hamilton Kennedy, an Academy Award nominated documentary film director. Kennedy and Eleanora lived in New York City for many years and spent summers in a legendary ocean-front mansion known as "Kilkare," located in Wainscott, Long Island. They spent winter months in a cottage in West Palm Beach, Florida and spent long vacations at their stone house in Ireland.
