= Michael Morton (criminal justice) =

American wrongly convicted of murder

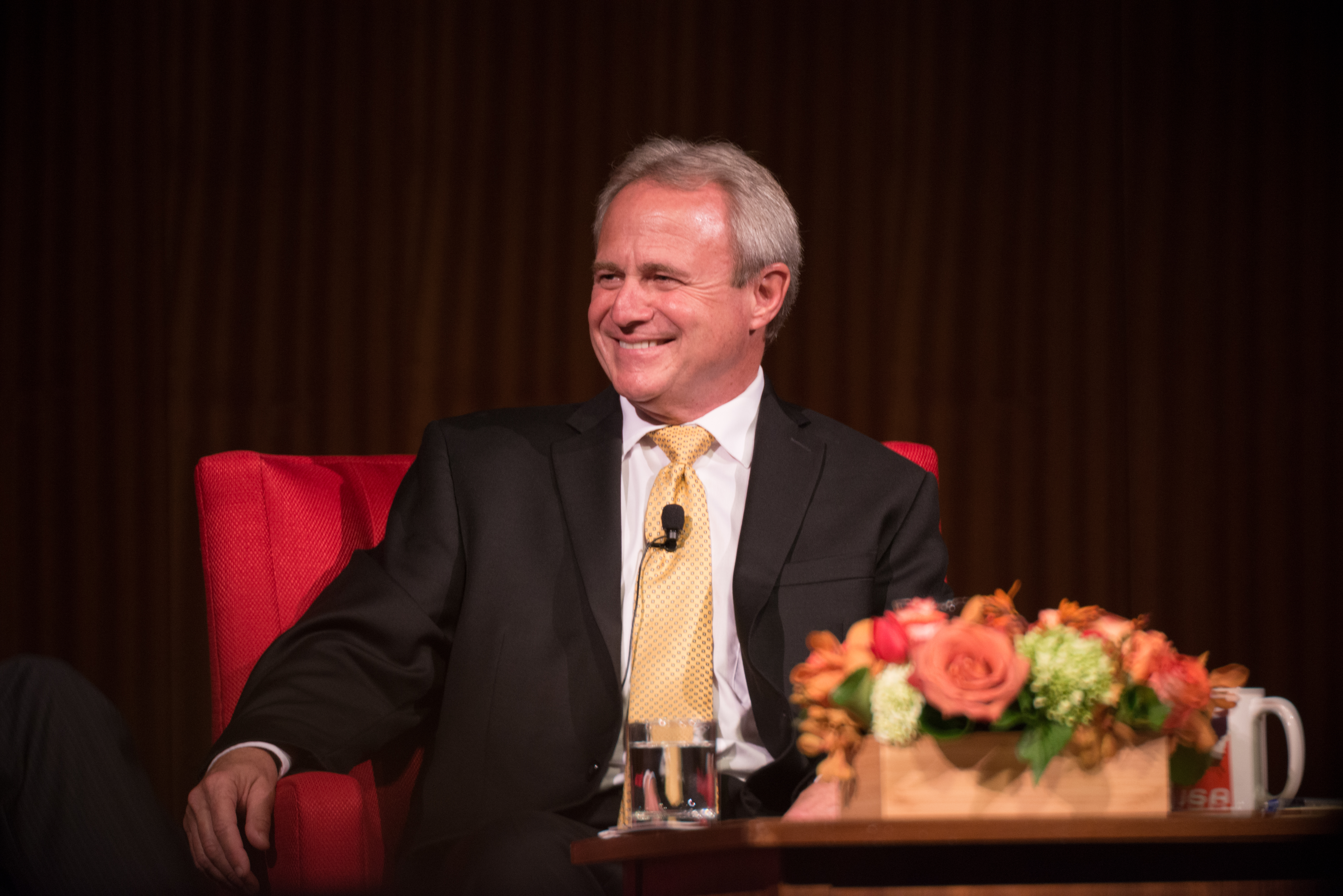
- Morton at the LBJ Presidential Library
- Born: August 12, 1954 (age 72)
- Citizenship: United States
- Known for: Miscarriage of justice
- Criminal charge: Murder (1987)
- Criminal penalty: Life imprisonment (1987)
- Criminal status: Released October 2011; Exonerated December 2011
- Spouses: Christine Kirkpatrick (m. 1979; died 1986) Cynthia May Chessman (m. 2013)
- Children: 1

Michael Wayne Morton (born August 12, 1954) is an American who was wrongfully convicted in 1987 in a Williamson County, Texas court of the 1986 murder of his wife Christine Morton. He spent nearly 25 years in prison before he was exonerated by DNA evidence which supported his claim of innocence and pointed to the crime being committed by another individual. Morton was released from prison on October 4, 2011, and another man, Mark Alan Norwood, was convicted of the murder in 2013. The prosecutor in the case, Ken Anderson, was convicted of contempt of court for withholding evidence after the judge had ordered its release to the defense.

== Early life, family and education ==
Michael Morton was born August 12, 1954. His family resided in Waco, Texas, then towns in California before settling in Kilgore, Texas.

In 1976, while attending a psychology class at Stephen F. Austin State University in Nacogdoches, Texas, Morton met Christine Kirkpatrick, a Catholic woman from Houston, Texas. They relocated to Austin, Texas, in 1977 after Michael dropped out of college, and they intended to transfer to the University of Texas, but because they would lose so many credits, they did not matriculate, instead finding jobs. They married in 1979. Their only child, Eric, was born in 1983 with a congenital heart defect that required open-heart surgery, but it could not be safely attempted until he was three years old. Six weeks after their son's successful surgery, on August 12, 1986, Morton and his family celebrated Michael's birthday.

The next day, after Michael Morton had left for work at a grocery store at six o'clock in the morning, Christine Morton was beaten to death in her bed while Eric was present. Michael learned of her death when he returned home from work.

== Death of wife ==
=== Arrest, conviction and incarceration ===
On September 25, 1986, Morton was arrested and charged with the murder of his wife. His conviction "partly was based on the now-debunked assertion that the time of a person’s death can be determined solely by studying stomach contents." He was convicted in February 1987 and sentenced to life imprisonment. Unknown to Morton and his attorney, "there was considerable evidence that strongly supported the defense theory that a stranger entered the home and killed Christine after Michael left. Almost all of this exculpatory evidence was contained in notes, reports, and transcripts gathered by the lead investigator Sgt. Don Wood of the Williamson County Sheriff’s Office," including an interview with three-year-old Eric Morton who explained he was at the scene and saw another man ("a monster") commit the crime and that Michael was not home. James Joseph Duane, in his book You Have the Right to Remain Innocent, has used what happened to Michael Morton as an example of why innocent people talking to the police can lead to their conviction for crimes they did not commit.

After initially being held in the Williamson County Jail, Morton was held at several Texas Department of Criminal Justice (TDCJ) prisons: the Diagnostic Unit in Huntsville, Wynne Unit in Huntsville, Ramsey I Unit in Brazoria County, and the Michael Unit in Anderson County. While imprisoned he did academic coursework, obtaining a bachelor's degree in psychology and a master's degree in literature; he requested a transfer to Ramsey for the master's program there, and was sent to Michael after he completed the program.

=== Post-trial investigation, appeal work and exoneration ===
Civil attorney John Raley of Houston, Texas, was working pro bono with Nina Morrison of the New York-based Innocence Project. Raley filed Morton's motion in February 2005 for DNA testing of a bloody bandana found near the crime scene which had Christine's hair on it. (DNA analysis was not available at the time of the trial.) Many years would pass without the testing. In 2010, Morton was offered parole if he expressed remorse over murdering his wife. Raley told The Texas Tribune about the conversation he had with Morton on the subject:

...Michael said that he understood that he would be paroled if he only showed remorse for his crime. And I said, "What are you going to do?" I didn't feel like I could advise him on that because, I mean, you know [it had been] 23 years now. I don't think anybody would have blamed him if he said, "I'm really sorry, let me go."

But Michael is a man of great integrity, and he would not lie to get out of prison.

And he said, "All I have left is my actual innocence, and if I have to be in prison the rest of my life, I'm not giving that up.' ...And I said, "Michael, I promise you, I will never quit."

Raley and Morrison relentlessly sought a court order for DNA testing in state and federal courts until the testing was finally achieved in June 2011. Williamson County District Attorney John Bradley "tenaciously fought" against DNA testing for six years before a judge finally ordered the tests. DNA tests linked another man, Mark Alan Norwood, to Christine Morton's murder. Morton was freed on October 4, 2011. He was formally acquitted by Bexar County District Judge Sid Harle on December 19, 2011. Morton became "the 45th Texas man whose conviction unraveled in the face of modern DNA tests."

The Innocence Project had filed a motion to remove Williamson County District Attorney John Bradley from further court proceedings, but it stopped pursuing the motion. "Bradley was so convinced by new findings and evidence that he helped Morton's lawyers obtain the ruling that released Morton from prison", and he agreed to dismiss the indictment against Morton, which allowed Morton to collect compensation. Under Texas law, he became eligible to receive a lump sum based on the number of years served in prison, plus a lifetime annuity of $80,000 per year, as well as job training and educational aid. By 2013, Morton had received $1.96 million, although it is unknown if legal fees reduced that sum.

=== Actual perpetrator ===
Mark Alan Norwood from Bastrop, Texas, worked as a dishwasher and was residing in Austin, Texas in the mid-1980s. On March 27, 2013, two years after Morton was released from prison, Norwood was charged, convicted and sentenced to life imprisonment for the 1986 murder of Christine Morton. In September 2016, he was convicted in a separate case: the January 1988 murder of Debra Masters Baker in her Austin home. Both women were beaten to death in their beds under similar circumstances.

=== Prosecutor Ken Anderson ===
On November 16, 2011, Morton's original prosecutor Ken Anderson told reporters, "I want to formally apologize for the system's failure to Mr. Morton. In hindsight, the verdict was wrong." Baker's daughter said she was unmoved by Anderson's apology and held him partially responsible for her mother's death because he and investigators allowed a killer to escape detection by focusing so intently on Morton. "It is harder for me to hear him not holding himself accountable. He is not taking responsibility," she said.

The same day as Morton's formal acquittal, Morton's attorneys (including Raley, Morrison, Barry Scheck of the Innocence Project, and Gerald Goldstein and Cynthia Orr of San Antonio) asked Judge Harle to order a court of inquiry into the actions of Anderson, who was then a district judge in Williamson County. A court of inquiry is a special court that investigates allegations of misconduct by elected officials in Texas. A "a relatively rare and unique Texas procedure", it can have significant financial cost, with total costs borne by the county at almost $500,000. Morton had accused Anderson of failing to provide defense lawyers with exculpatory evidence indicating that another man might have killed Morton's wife, including information that his 3-year-old son witnessed the murder and said that his father was not home at the time. Other exculpatory evidence included:

reports from neighbors seeing a man in a green van behind the Morton home around the time of Christine's murder; the transcript of an interview by Sgt. Wood of Rita Kirkpatrick, Morton's mother-in-law, stating that her three-year-old grandson Eric told her he saw a "a monster" — not his father — beat his mother to death; evidence that Christine's purse was stolen and her credit card and checkbook fraudulently used several days later; unidentified fingerprints in the Morton home; and an unidentified footprint in the backyard.

Morton's attorneys discovered this evidence while preparing a final appeal, using an open records request. They were able to depose Anderson—and others involved in the investigation—under oath. Testimony from former prosecutor Doug Arnold indicated that Anderson revealed he would not have Sgt. Wood testify so that "the other side can't have access to those reports."

On February 20, 2012, Judge Harle asked the Texas Supreme Court to convene a court of inquiry, finding that there was evidence to support Morton's contention that Anderson had tampered with evidence and should have been held in contempt of court for not complying with the trial judge's order to let him review all possible exculpatory evidence. The court of inquiry was held in February 2013. On April 19, 2013, the court of inquiry ordered Anderson to be arrested, stating, "This court cannot think of a more intentionally harmful act than a prosecutor's conscious choice to hide mitigating evidence so as to create an uneven playing field for a defendant facing a murder charge and a life sentence." Anderson responded by claiming immunity from any prosecution under the expiry of applicable statutes of limitation. On September 23, 2013, Anderson resigned from his position as district court judge.

On November 8, 2013, Anderson was found to be in contempt of court by 9th Judicial District Judge Kelly Moore. Anderson pleaded no contest to the charges as part of a plea bargain. After the plea agreement was announced, it was publicly revealed that Williamson County District Attorney Jana Duty agreed to authorize an independent review of every case that Anderson ever prosecuted, along with every case in which Bradley successfully opposed DNA testing. Anderson was sentenced to 10 days in county jail, to begin no later than December 2, 2013;. He received credit for one day he spent in jail in April 2013 (when he was arrested following the court of inquiry) and ultimately only served five days. He was fined $500 and ordered to perform 500 hours of community service. In exchange for having the charges of evidence tampering dropped, he agreed to relinquish his license to practice law. He would be eligible to apply to have his law license reinstated after five years. On November 15, 2013, Anderson was released from jail after having served five days of his 10-day sentence, released early after receiving credit for good behavior.

=== The Michael Morton Act ===
On May 16, 2013, Governor of Texas Rick Perry signed Texas Senate Bill 1611, also called the Michael Morton Act, into law. The Act is designed to ensure a more open discovery process. The bill's open file policy removes barriers for accessing evidence. Morton was present for the signing of the bill, which became law on September 1, 2013.

== Later life ==
After being released from prison, Morton lived with his parents in Liberty City, Texas, and later relocated to Kilgore, Texas. He was able to reconnect with his son, Eric, then 28 years old, after some initial resistance. Eric had been adopted by Christine Morton's younger sister and her husband, having cut contact with Michael when he was 15 years old because he believed that Michael was guilty of Christine's murder.

In 2013, Michael Morton married Cynthia May Chessman; they met at his church.

== In popular media ==
- Morton's case was featured on CBS's 60 Minutes on March 25, 2012 and on Katie, the Katie Couric TV talk show, on November 13, 2012.
- The Morton case is the subject of a 2013 documentary film, An Unreal Dream: The Michael Morton Story, directed by Al Reinert. The film was featured on CNN Films December 8, 2013.
- Morton's memoir, Getting Life: An Innocent Man's 25-Year Journey from Prison to Peace, was released on July 8, 2014.

== See also ==
- List of miscarriage of justice cases
- List of wrongful convictions in the United States
- Overturned convictions in the United States
- Cameron Todd Willingham
- Clarence Elkins
- David Camm
- Ryan Ferguson
