= Donald Fiedler =

American activist

Donald Bruce Fiedler (February 2, 1943 - May 15, 2008) was an American cannabis rights activist. In 1989, he succeeded Jon Gettman as the executive director of NORML. He held that position until 1991 when he was replaced by Richard Cowan.

Donald Bruce Fiedler

February 2, 1943 — May 15, 2008

Criminal Defense Attorney, Educator, Performer, Cannabis Reform Advocate

Donald Bruce Fiedler was an American criminal defense attorney who practiced law for over 40 years, a founding figure in Nebraska's criminal defense community, and a national voice for cannabis legalization during the movement's most difficult years. He served as Executive Director of the National Organization for the Reform of Marijuana Laws (NORML) from 1989 to 1991. Beyond the courtroom, he was an accomplished stage performer, bringing historical legal figures to life in one-man shows across the country.

Early Life and Education

Fiedler was born February 2, 1943, in Omaha, Nebraska, to Alfred A. Fiedler, an attorney, and Ruth Fiedler. He grew up in Omaha and would spend his entire life and career rooted in Nebraska.

He earned his law degree and joined his father's practice in Omaha in 1970, initially intending to focus on civil law. The demands of clients in an era of escalating drug prosecutions pushed him instead toward criminal defense — a shift that would define the next four decades of his professional life.

Legal Career

Criminal Defense Practice

Fiedler practiced criminal defense for over 40 years in Omaha, specializing in felony cases, particularly drug-related prosecutions. His early work focused heavily on Fourth Amendment challenges — searches, seizures, and evidentiary issues — at a time when the Nixon administration's "War on Drugs" was flooding state courts with possession and trafficking cases.

His approach was constitutional, precise, and relentless. He defended clients accused of cultivation, possession with intent, and conspiracy, often leveraging procedural violations and evidentiary flaws to challenge charges that carried mandatory minimum sentences. In cases like United States v. Van Horn (D. Neb. 1984), he filed motions to suppress wiretap evidence, arguing insufficient probable cause and statutory non-compliance — the kind of meticulous constitutional defense that defined his practice.

Peers described him as a "lion of the bar" — a mentor to younger attorneys and a fierce advocate for the underdog. He was known for taking cases others wouldn't, representing indigent clients with the same vigor he brought to his paying cases.

Founding the Nebraska Criminal Defense Attorneys Association

In 1985, Fiedler co-founded the Nebraska Criminal Defense Attorneys Association (NCDAA), formalizing a statewide network of defense practitioners at a time when criminal justice policies were becoming increasingly punitive. The organization provided training, resources, and mutual support for attorneys facing the expanding machinery of federal and state drug enforcement.

In 1986, the NCDAA awarded Fiedler its inaugural "Last Champion" honor, recognizing his trial advocacy during an era of mandatory minimums, asset forfeiture, and aggressive drug prosecutions. The award reflected the respect he commanded among his peers — not merely as a skilled attorney, but as someone who embodied the constitutional principles of defense work.

Faculty at the National Criminal Defense College

Fiedler served as a longtime faculty member at the National Criminal Defense College in Macon, Georgia, where he taught courtroom techniques to attorneys from across the country. His teaching style was theatrical and immersive — drawing on his training as a performer to dramatize trial skills in ways that made lessons unforgettable. Generations of defense attorneys learned cross-examination, opening statements, and jury communication from his presentations.

His commitment to teaching continued until the end of his life. After his death, his survivors requested memorials be directed to the National Criminal Defense College.

The Donald B. Fiedler Memorial Scholarship

Following his death, the NCDAA established the Donald B. Fiedler Memorial Scholarship to the National Criminal Defense College. Awarded annually, the scholarship covers full tuition, travel, room, and board for up to four Nebraska-licensed criminal defense attorneys to attend the two-week Trial Practice Institute at Roger Williams University School of Law in Bristol, Rhode Island.

Recipients have described the experience as transformative — an intensive education in trial skills that shapes careers and elevates representation for defendants across Nebraska. The scholarship ensures Fiedler's name continues to train defenders, carrying his commitment into courtrooms throughout the state.

Performing Arts

Beyond the courtroom, Fiedler was an accomplished stage performer. He wrote and performed one-man shows portraying historical legal figures including Clarence Darrow and William Jennings Bryan, staging them for legal conferences, public audiences, and universities nationwide.

His theatrical skills informed his trial work. Colleagues recalled his dramatic courtroom presentations — not as artifice, but as a method of making legal arguments visceral, human, and unforgettable. The same presence that held audiences in a theater held juries in a courtroom.

NORML Leadership (1989–1991)

Appointment

Fiedler's involvement with NORML began in 1975, when he visited the organization's Washington, D.C., office. Founder Keith Stroup recruited him as Nebraska state coordinator, and Fiedler contributed to Nebraska's 1976 marijuana decriminalization bill — attending legislative sessions daily and aiding its drafting, which reduced penalties for small amounts to a civil infraction.

He served on NORML's board of directors starting in 1988. In the summer of 1989, with the organization facing financial crisis, declining membership, and the full force of the federal "War on Drugs," the board selected Fiedler as Executive Director. He succeeded Jon Gettman and inherited an organization that had been described as being at "the worst moment in its history."

Tenure

Upon taking leadership, Fiedler immediately prioritized financial stabilization. By early 1990, he had reduced NORML's debt by 30 to 40 percent through operational restructuring and resource management.

His broader strategy included:

· Grassroots revitalization: Strengthening communication with approximately 30 local chapters, providing policy updates and press strategies to bolster local advocacy

· Media outreach: Developing advertising campaigns targeting non-consumers affected by asset forfeiture and workplace drug policies

· Legal action: Pursuing re-engagement in federal court challenges, including preparations for litigation tied to a prior administrative ruling favoring marijuana's rescheduling from Schedule I to Schedule II

· Legislative advocacy: Capitol Hill outreach emphasizing economic analyses, including a 1989 Harvard study estimating substantial gaps between prohibition costs and potential tax revenue

· Defense support: Committing organizational resources to defend targets of federal enforcement operations

In August 1990, Fiedler participated in NORML's 20th anniversary conference, which featured panels on drug education, the history of marijuana reform, decriminalization disparities across states, and hemp's potential as a mainstream policy issue.

His tenure yielded meaningful organizational stabilization — debt reduction, membership maintenance — but no significant federal policy victories, consistent with the political realities of the Bush administration's intensified drug enforcement.

Resignation

Fiedler resigned as Executive Director in 1991, with the board facilitating a leadership transition to Richard Cowan. His departure followed sustained organizational strain, and the transition marked a refocusing of advocacy efforts amid persistent funding challenges. He returned to private practice in Omaha, where he continued defending clients in drug-related federal cases for the remainder of his career.

Advocacy Philosophy

Fiedler argued that marijuana's Schedule I classification was legally and medically unjustified. When the DEA rejected rescheduling recommendations in 1989, he described the decision as "arbitrary and capricious," asserting it denied physicians a legitimate tool for treating severe nausea in cancer patients and other conditions.

His advocacy rested on constitutional principles: he contended prohibition infringed on personal privacy, stating the government had "no right interfering with the private lives of its citizens." He pushed for full legalization, arguing decriminalization alone was obsolete by the 1990s.

Economically, he emphasized the misallocation of enforcement resources — targeting home growers while violent crime went under-policed — and the revenue potential of regulated cannabis markets.

His approach was grounded in his decades of courtroom experience, where he had seen firsthand how drug prohibition filled court dockets with low-level offenders while doing little to address addiction or public safety.

Later Life and Death

Following his NORML tenure, Fiedler resumed full-time criminal defense practice in Omaha. He continued taking drug-related federal cases, including appellate work. He testified on Nebraska legislation affecting cannabis policy and remained engaged with reform networks, though his focus shifted toward individual client representation rather than organizational leadership.

He was preceded in death by his parents, Alfred A. and Ruth Fiedler. He was survived by his son, David Fiedler, and David's fiancée, Angela Davis, of Minneapolis; his granddaughter, Mackenzie Fiedler, of Omaha; and his sister, Sandra Straus, of New York.

Donald Fiedler died in May 2008 in Omaha at the age of 65. Memorials were directed to the National Criminal Defense College, the institution where he had trained generations of defense attorneys.

Legacy

Donald Fiedler's career bridged the courtroom, the classroom, the stage, and the front lines of cannabis reform. He co-founded the organization that still supports Nebraska's criminal defense bar. He taught trial skills to attorneys who carry his methods into courtrooms today. He led NORML through a period that might have ended the organization — and preserved it for the battles to come. His scholarship continues to train defenders.

He was not wealthy. He did not become famous. But the attorneys he mentored, the clients he defended, and the movement he stabilized carry his influence forward. In an era when defending cannabis reform meant professional risk and public ridicule, Donald Fiedler stood up — in courtrooms, in lecture halls, on stages, and before legislatures — and argued that the law should serve justice.

He died at the age of 65 on Thursday May 15, 2008.
