= Prosecutorial misconduct =

Illegal act or omission by a prosecutor in a trial by jury

In jurisprudence, prosecutorial misconduct or prosecutorial overreach is "an illegal act or failing to act, on the part of a prosecutor, especially an attempt to sway the jury to wrongly convict a defendant or to impose a harsher than appropriate punishment." It is similar to selective prosecution. Prosecutors are bound by a set of rules which outline fair and dispassionate conduct.

== Types of misconduct ==
- Failure to disclose exculpatory evidence
- False confession
- Falsified evidence
- Malicious prosecution
- Prosecutorial corruption
- Retaliatory prosecution
- Selective prosecution
- Subornation of perjury

== Examples and remedies ==
In late 1993, the 6th US Circuit Court of Appeals ruled that John Demjanjuk had been a victim of prosecutorial misconduct during a 1986 trial in which federal prosecutors withheld evidence. Demjanjuk's sentence was overturned, but he lost when his case was retried. See Brady v Maryland.

In the 1995 murder trial of O. J. Simpson, the defense argued that Los Angeles Police Department detective Mark Fuhrman had planted evidence at the crime scene. Although Fuhrman denied the allegations, Simpson was found not guilty, although he was later held liable for the deaths in a civil suit filed by the families of the victims. In USA Today (August 24, 1995), Francis Fukuyama stated, "[Such defenses lead to] a distrust of government and the belief that public authorities are in a vast conspiracy to violate the rights of individuals." However, such misconduct may actually be widespread in the United States. "It’s a result-oriented process today, fairness be damned," Robert Merkle, former U.S. Attorney for the Middle District of Florida, said. Prosecutors are protected from civil liability even when they knowingly and maliciously break the law in order to secure convictions, and the doctrine of harmless error can be used by appellate courts to uphold convictions despite such illegal tactics, which some argue gives prosecutors few incentives to comply with the law.

In 2011 a Texas man, Michael Morton was released from prison after serving nearly 25 years for the murder of his wife in 1987. He was released after DNA evidence pointed to another man as the killer. The prosecutor, Ken Anderson later pleaded guilty to withholding evidence that could have helped Morton fight the murder charge. He was sentenced to spend 10 days in jail and was also disbarred.

Despite such, the defense has been successful in roughly 1 out of 6 times it has been used from 1970 to 2003. During that period, judges have cited misconduct by prosecutors as a reason to dismiss charges, reverse convictions, or reduce sentences in 2,012 cases, according to a study by the Center for Public Integrity released in 2003; the researchers looked at 11,452 cases in which misconduct was alleged.

A debate persists over the meaning of the term. Prosecutors have asked judges to stop using the term to refer to an unintentional error, and to restrict its use to describe a breach of professional ethics. E. Norman Veasey, the chief justice of Delaware Supreme Court, answered one such request in 2003 by noting the term's extensive use in rulings over the past 60 years. "We believe it would be confusing to change the terminology in view of this history," he wrote in reply.

== See also ==
- Attorney misconduct
- Fruit of the poisonous tree
- Harmless error
- Malicious Prosecution
- Selective Prosecution
- List of wrongful convictions in the United States
