= Eleanora Kennedy =

Italian American businesswoman and horseracing owner

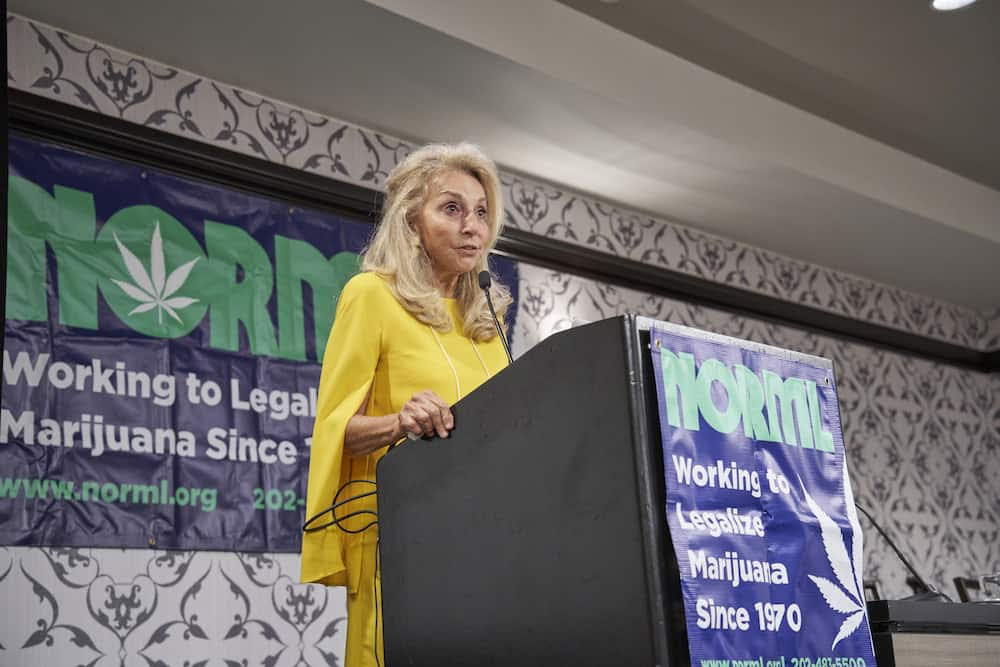
- Kennedy introducing the winner of the NORML Michael Kennedy Social Justice Award, in September 2019

Personal information
- Born: United States
- Occupations: Racehorse owner, cannabis activist, socialite
- Spouse: Michael John Kennedy

Horse racing career
- Sport: Horse racing
- Career wins: 25+ (ongoing)

Major racing wins
- European Flat racing: Richmond Stakes (2024); Ingabelle Stakes (2021)

Eleanora Kennedy (born:Eleanora Baratelli) is an Italian-American businesswoman, cannabis activist and racehorse owner, based in The Black Valley, in Ireland. She was married to criminal defense lawyer Michael John Kennedy until his death in 2016. Avenue magazine named her on its "Power Elite" list in 2017 and 2018.

Eleanora took the reins of High Times on her husbands death.

Moving to Ireland in 2020, she grew to prominence as a racehorse owner. She has been described as "Ireland's luckiest racehorse owner".
