= Gettman =

Gettman is a surname. Notable people with the surname include:

- Jake Gettman (1875–1956), Russian-born American baseball player
- Jon Gettman (born 1957), American cannabis activist
- Virginia Leslie Gettman (1922–2011), American actress known professionally as Leslie Brooks
