= Sid Harle =

American judge

Sid Harle is an American judge and Republican politician who presided over several high-profile cases.

== Biography ==
Sid Harle was appointed as Judge of the 226th District Court (Felony Criminal Bench) in 1988 by Governor Bill Clements. He held the position for over 29 years before his retirement in 2016 and his appointment as the Fourth Administrative Judge. Prior to his appointment, Harle served as a prosecutor for the Bexar County District Attorney's Office and as the Chief Municipal Prosecutor for the City of Hill Country Village. Additionally, he was appointed by the Texas Supreme Court to the Judicial Conduct Commission, where he was elected Chair and served for two consecutive terms.

Harle received his J.D. from St. Mary's University School of Law in 1980, and has worked as an adjunct professor of trial advocacy for over 20 years.

== High Profile Cases ==
During his campaign for the Court of Criminal Appeals, Harle was stated to have had more death penalty experience than any District Court judge in Texas, and that none of his death penalty sentences had been overturned on appeal.

=== Michael Morton ===
Michael Morton was convicted in 1987 for the murder of his wife, Christine Morton, and sentenced to life in prison. DNA testing exonerated Morton 25 years later when Judge Sid Harle formally acquitted him on December 19, 2011.

=== Adrian Estrada ===
Adrian Estrada, a former youth pastor at the El Sendero Assembly of God church in San Antonio, was sentenced to death by Judge Sid Harle for the murder of a pregnant 17-year-old woman who attended the congregation. After over 40 appeals made on Adrian Estrada's behalf by the ACLU, the case was revisited by Judge Harle and the death sentence was revoked in exchange for a life sentence and Estrada ceding his right to appeal the ruling.

=== Jackie Len Neal ===
Jackie Len Neal, a former San Antonio Police officer, was accused of abducting and sexually assaulting 19-year-old female in his patrol car in 2013. Neal was fired after being accused of the assault, and was sentenced to 14 months in prison by Judge Harle after he pled guilty to a lesser charge. The case sparked outrage across San Antonio and the city's South Side district where the assault occurred.

=== Kevin Watts ===
Judge Sid Harle pronounced the death penalty for Kevin Watts, who was found guilty of three execution style murders at the Sam Won Garden Restaurant in San Antonio, Texas. Watts was executed by lethal injection in October 2008.

== Awards and honors ==
Judge of the Year – Texas Gang Investigators Association Bexar County Republicans Hall of Fame
