= Indiana NORML =

- Indiana NORML
- Parent organization: National Organization for the Reform of Marijuana Laws (NORML)
- Website: www.inorml.org

Indiana NORML is the National Organization for the Reform of Marijuana Laws (NORML) affiliate for the U.S. state of Indiana. As of 2020, William Henry served as chairman of Indiana NORML.

== Media and activism ==
In January 2020, Indiana NORML stepped up its grassroots efforts with over 3,000 volunteers in 70 counties. They also hosted the first congressional cannabis debate in Indiana.

== See also ==
- List of cannabis organizations
- Cannabis in Indiana
