= Erik Altieri =

American executive and cannabis reform advocate

Erik Altieri is an American political activist, public speaker, and advocate for cannabis reform. He served as the executive director of the National Organization for the Reform of Marijuana Laws (NORML) from November 2016 to March 2023, during which he played a prominent role in advancing cannabis legalization in the United States. Altieri was the youngest executive director in NORML's history and was recognized by Forbes as one of their "30 Under 30" in Law and Policy in 2017.

== Biography ==
=== Early life and education ===
Erik Altieri was born and raised in Northeast Philadelphia, Pennsylvania, and later moved to South Jersey during his adolescence. His interest in politics began during the early 2000s, inspired by anti-war activism in response to U.S. military interventions in Iraq and Afghanistan.

Altieri attended American University in Washington, D.C., where he studied public policy and advocacy. His time in college deepened his interest in grassroots activism and reform movements.

=== Career ===
==== Early roles at NORML (2007–2015) ====
Altieri joined NORML in 2007 as the organization's communications director. In this role, he managed NORML's federal lobbying efforts, coordinated legislative outreach, and served as a spokesperson for the press. Altieri also oversaw NORML's social media platforms, which he expanded significantly, increasing public engagement with the organization.

Additionally, Altieri became the manager of NORML PAC, where he focused on electing cannabis reform-friendly candidates at the federal, state, and local levels. His leadership during this period helped amplify NORML's influence in the legislative process.

==== Departure and return to NORML ====
In 2015, Altieri briefly left NORML to work on broader advocacy initiatives, including campaign finance reform and tax policy. However, he returned in November 2016 as the executive director, becoming the youngest person in NORML's history to hold the position.

==== Executive director (2016–2023) ====
During his tenure as executive director, Altieri led the organization through a period of significant progress in cannabis legalization, with multiple U.S. states legalizing recreational and medicinal cannabis. Under his leadership, NORML expanded its network to include over 165 state and local chapters nationwide and strengthened its lobbying efforts at the federal level.

Altieri stepped down as executive director in March 2023 to focus on broader criminal justice reform efforts.

== Legacy and impact ==
Altieri's tenure at NORML is widely regarded as a period of growth and increasing influence for the organization. He oversaw key campaigns that contributed to the widespread normalization of cannabis legalization, worked to destigmatize cannabis use, and engaged younger generations in reform movements.

== Achievements ==
- Named to Forbes’ "30 Under 30" in Law and Policy (2017).
- Youngest executive director in NORML's history.
- Expanded NORML's advocacy reach, including federal, state, and local levels.

== See also ==
- Cannabis legalization in the United States
- National Organization for the Reform of Marijuana Laws
- Cannabis reform advocacy
