= John Raley =

American lawyer

- Born: John Wesley Raley III
- Education: University of Oklahoma
- Occupation: Attorney
- Years active: 07/19/1985 - Present
- Known for: The defense attorney for Hannah Overton and Michael Morton in the state of Texas.

John Wesley Raley III is an American attorney based in the state of Texas. He is best known for his work in the legal defense of Michael Morton and Hannah Overton.

On May 2, 2018, Raley was appointed by Harris County, Texas District Attorney Kim Ogg to conduct an independent review of Alfred Dewayne Brown's overturned murder conviction from 3 years prior.

== Michael Morton case ==
Michael Morton was a Texas man that was wrongfully convicted in 1987 in Williamson County, Texas for his wife's murder in 1986. Morton insisted that he was innocent while being sent to prison, claiming "I did not do this". The jury foreman of the case at the time of conviction said "We all felt so strongly that this was justice for Christine and that we were doing the right thing."

After a request from co-founder of the Innocence Project, Barry Scheck, John Raley took over the case pro bono along with Nina Morrison of the Innocence Project. In February 2005, Morrison and Raley filed a motion for the DNA testing of Morton. For 6 years, Morrison and Raley fought in state and federal courts until they finally were granted a court order to have a bloody bandana tested.

In an interview with 60 Minutes about the case, Raley spoke about the moment when he found police reports that he felt should have been shared with the original defense team, Raley said "It was one of those moments where you almost faint, to hold in my hand a copy of the document that the district attorney at the time had but didn't tell anyone on the defense-side...[That document] would have proved [Morton's] innocence."

In 2010, Morton was offered parole if he expressed remorse over murdering his wife. Raley told the Texas Tribune about the conversation he had with Morton on the subject:

"...Michael said that he understood that he would be paroled if he only showed remorse for his crime. And I said, 'What are you going to do?' I didn’t feel like I could advise him on that because, I mean, you know [it had been] 23 years now. I don’t think anybody would have blamed him if he said, 'I’m really sorry, let me go.'

But Michael is a man of great integrity, and he would not lie to get out of prison.

And he said, 'All I have left is my actual innocence, and if I have to be in prison the rest of my life, I’m not giving that up.'...And I said, 'Michael, I promise you, I will never quit.'"

In June 2011, Michael Morton was released from prison and an inquiry into the district attorney's handling of the case was opened by Raley.

== Hannah Overton case ==
Andrew Burd, son of Hannah Overton, died in their Corpus Christi home in 2006 after ingesting a lethal amount of sodium. Hannah Overton was subsequently charged and convicted of the capital murder of Andrew. While the prosecutors alleged abuse of the child due to bruises discovered on his body and a motive of having too many children to take care of (Hannah was pregnant and would have 5 children including Andrew and the pregnancy.) While the jury did not believe the prosecution's theory of the case, they convicted on the basis of Overton not taking her child to emergency care in a timely manner.

As it turned out, multiple witnesses were not able to testify on Overton's behalf due to the defense counsel's oversight. One doctor had testified on videotape that an overdose of sodium can cause a child to easily bruise. Another that was not allowed to speak at trial had worked with Andrew before, and had knowledge that he was developmentally challenged and would eat "weird things".

In 2007, Raley became the attorney specializing in medical evidence/law on Overton's legal team, which included Cynthia Orr; the team fought for an overturning of the trial that found her guilty due to defence team incompetence. After appeal, the court overturned Overton and her husband's convictions and ordered a new trial. In May 2017, the Nueces County DA declined to prosecute further, and made a statement that granted Overton access to compensation for her wrongful conviction.

== Awards and accolades ==
For his work on the Michael Morton case, Raley was given the "Houstonian of the Year" award by the Houston Chronicle in 2013. The Chronicle cited Raley's time commitment to the case and unwillingness to give up on the case and implied that the case contributed to the passage of a law mandating DNA testing on all death-penalty cases. In 2017, Raley was given the Clarence Darrow award by the Harris County Democratic Lawyers association, also for his work on the Morton case.

For his then ongoing work on the Hannah Overton case and success in the Morton case, Raley keynoted the 6th annual Atticus Finch Day One of the co-founders remarked that Raley was a "Real-life Atticus Finch" on the occasion.
