= Regent University School of Law =

Law school in Virginia, United States

Coordinates: 36°48′2″N 76°11′48″W

- Parent school: Regent University
- Religious affiliation: Evangelicalism
- Established: 1986; 40 years ago
- School type: Private law school
- Dean: S. Ernie Walton
- Location: Virginia Beach, Virginia, U.S.
- Enrollment: 341
- Faculty: 24 (full-time), 40 (part-time) (2025)
- USNWR ranking: 91st (tie) (2026)
- Bar pass rate: 91.26% (2025 first-time takers, all jurisdictions)
- Website: www.regent.edu/school-of-law
- ABA profile: ABA Profile

Regent University School of Law is the law school of Regent University, a private Christian university in Virginia Beach, Virginia, U.S. It was founded in 1986 and accredited by the American Bar Association in 1996.

== Admissions ==
=== J.D. Program ===
For the class entering in 2025, Regent Law received 537 completed applications and offered admission to 238 applicants, resulting in an acceptance rate of 44.32%. Of those admitted, 126 enrolled (yield rate of 52.94%), with 1 additional first-year enrollees, who had deferred admission from a previous year, bringing the total entering class to 127 students (123 full-time and 4 part-time). The median LSAT score was 158 and the median undergraduate GPA was 3.68. Four students were not included in the GPA calculation.

J.D. students who entered in Fall 2023 or later must maintain a cumulative law GPA of at least 2.20 at the end of each spring semester and to graduate; those who fall below it are academically dismissed. The threshold for earlier entrants was 2.00.

The following tables present admissions volume and academic credentials for entering JD classes from 2021 to 2024:

Applications, Acceptance Rates, and First-Year Enrollment
Year	Applications	Acceptance Rate (%)	Full-Time	Part-Time
2025	537	44.32	123	4
2024	539	44.34	114	5
2023	548	40.88	112	0
2022	559	41.32	114	0
2021	670	39.70	121	3

LSAT and GPA Percentiles of Entering JD Classes
Year	LSAT (25th)	LSAT (Median)	LSAT (75th)	GPA (25th)	GPA (Median)	GPA (75th)
2025	153	158	161	3.37	3.68	3.89
2024	153	158	161	3.39	3.64	3.80
2023	152	157	160	3.40	3.68	3.88
2022	153	157	160	3.26	3.63	3.90
2021	153	156	159	3.38	3.64	3.85

=== LL.M. Program ===
Regent Law offers three LL.M. tracks designed for lawyers holding a first law degree, including internationally trained attorneys. The programs include LL.M. in American Legal Studies, LL.M. in Human Rights, and LL.M. in Foundations of American Law. LL.M. students attend classes alongside JD students on campus. Alumni of the LL.M. program have come from countries including China, Korea, Thailand, and Colombia. Regent also maintains a partnership with Handong International Law School (HILS) to offer LL.M. degrees to HILS graduates and current students.

== Bar examination passage ==
In 2024, the overall bar examination passage rate for the law school's first-time test takers was 88.18 percent. The average first-time pass rate for American Bar Association accredited schools was 77.60 percent. The ultimate bar pass rate for Regent students, which the American Bar Association defines as the passage rate for graduates who sat for bar examinations within two years of graduating, was 94.62 percent for the class of 2022.

== Rankings ==
In 2025, Regent University School of Law was ranked tied for 94th in the nation by U.S. News & World Report out of 197 ABA accredited schools, reflecting what the university described as a historic milestone and its highest placement to date. The school rose 53 places over a four-year period, which the university states is the fastest improvement among all accredited law schools during that time.

The university attributed the advancement to strong student outcomes, including a 93 percent employment rate in full-credit ABA positions within ten months of graduation and a top 40 national performance in first-time bar passage.

According to university officials, the 2025 ranking reflects growing national recognition of Regent Law's mission-driven approach, academic rigor, and community culture.

== Employment ==
According to the schools's official ABA-required disclosures for 2022 graduates, within ten months after graduation 83.50% of the 97 member graduating class was employed in full-time positions requiring bar passage (i.e. as attorneys), 6.19% were employed in full-time JD advantage positions, and 2.06% employed in professional positions. Positions were in various size law firms, most being in 1-10 attorney firms as well as in firms of up to 500 attorneys, 12 graduates obtained local or state judicial clerkships, and three obtained federal clerkships. 28 were employed in public interest, government, higher education, or business employment. 2.06% of the class was still seeking employment.

== Competitions, advocacy, and publications ==
=== Moot court ===
Regent University School of Law has a nationally ranked moot court program that regularly competes in the ABA National Appellate Advocacy Competition and other appellate contests. Regent teams have won numerous regional championships and brief and oralist awards. In 2023, a team won the ABA regional title and placed among the top oralists. The program was ranked fifth nationally by the University of Houston Law Center in 2016.

Regent has also competed internationally in the Price Media Law Moot Court Programme at Oxford University, reaching the global top 16 in 2017 and winning the Americas Regional Championship in 2016.

=== Advocacy and dispute resolution competitions ===
Regent University School of Law's Center for Advocacy trains students in negotiation, trial advocacy, and alternative dispute resolution, developing competition teams that have achieved national distinction. Regent teams have won more than 90 national and regional championships, along with numerous best brief and best oralist awards.

Recent accomplishments include national titles at the Stetson National Pre-Trial Advocacy Competition (2019, 2021), the ABA Negotiation Competition, and the Robert R. Merhige Environmental Law Negotiation Competition. Regent teams have also earned top placements in the ABA Client Counseling Competition and the TYLA National Trial Competition.

=== Law review ===
Established in 1991, the Regent University Law Review is a student-edited legal journal published by the Regent University School of Law. It presents academically rigorous scholarship on legal issues from the perspective of a historic Christian worldview and is committed to a jurisprudence grounded in a Higher Law, understood as the Law of God. While rooted in this perspective, the journal publishes opposing viewpoints that offer substantive contributions to legal discourse.

The Law Review provides a forum for applying this perspective to the modern legal system and seeks to serve both academic and professional audiences. Student editors and staff are selected based on academic performance and writing ability, typically through a competitive spring writing competition involving legal analysis and citation exercises.

In addition to its print publication, the Law Review produces Pro Tempore, an online supplement focused on current legal developments. Notable past contributors include U.S. Supreme Court Justice Clarence Thomas, former U.S. Attorneys General John Ashcroft and Edwin Meese III, Judge Edith H. Jones, Charles W. Colson, Robert P. George, Charles E. Rice, Nancy R. Pearcey, James Bopp, and others.

== Notable people ==
=== Deans ===
- Jeffrey A. Brauch (2000–2015)
- Michael V. Hernandez (2015–2019)
- Mark D. Martin (2019–2022)
- Bradley Lingo (2022–2025)
- Ernie Walton (2025–present, interim)

=== Faculty ===
- John D. Ashcroft
- Erin Hawley
- James Joseph Duane
- Supreme Court Justice Samuel Alito

=== Alumni ===
- Monica Goodling (JD 1999), attorney notable for her role in the 2006 dismissal of U.S. attorneys
- Daniel Kelly (JD 1991), former Wisconsin Supreme Court Justice
- Bob McDonnell (JD 1989), 71st governor of Virginia
- Kristen Waggoner (JD 1997), attorney, lead counsel in Supreme Court First Amendment rights case, Masterpiece Cakeshop v. Colorado Civil Rights Commission
