= Gerry Goldstein =

American lawyer

Gerald "Gerry" Harris Goldstein is a criminal defense attorney in San Antonio, Texas, best known for his civil rights and drug-charge defenses. He is currently a partner of Goldstein & Orr and is Board Certified by the State Bar of Texas in criminal law and appeals.

== Early life and education ==
Goldstein was born in Santa Maria, California in 1944. At the time, his father, Eli Goldstein, was a lawyer working for the Judge Advocate General's Corps (JAG) at the Army Air Force Base in Santa Maria. His parents later moved to San Antonio, Texas, where Goldstein grew up. Goldstein has a bachelor's degree in art from Tulane University and received his law degree from the University of Texas at Austin in 1968.

== Career ==
Goldstein joined his father's law firm in San Antonio. After a medical deferment from the Vietnam War, he partnered with Maury Maverick, Jr., a liberal leader in Texas politics, to defend conscientious objectors and civil rights cases. In 1970, Goldstein joined the National Organization for the Reform of Marijuana Laws (NORML), and began building a reputation for defending drug charge cases after he represented the organization's founder, Keith Stroup, after a drug bust.

Goldstein represented a newly hired theater operator in San Antonio who had been arrested for showing the x-rated movie Deep Throat in 1974. Goldstein won the case before the Supreme Court on appeal.

Goldstein's 1978 appeal reversed the convictions in the Piedras Negras Jailbreak Case. In that case, the two men, Sterling Davis, Sr. and William McCoy Hill, entered the border city's jail in Mexico and freed fourteen American inmates charged with drug offenses. The U.S. government indicted the two men alleging that a sawed-off shotgun used during the raid violated gunrunning laws. The men went to prison. Goldstein won the appeal by arguing that the two men had unknowingly, as opposed to intentionally, violated the law because neither had known the length at which a sawed-off shotgun was illegal.

He represented one of Texas House Speaker Billy Clayton's cronies in the kickback scandal known as Brilab in 1980.

Goldstein represented a fringe Mormon group that advocates polygamy, regarding a raid of their Texas ranch. He represented the Yearning for Zion Ranch head Frederick Merril Jessop's case. The polygamist sect was investigated and prosecuted after a massive child-abuse investigation. Goldstein argued in court that although the multiple marriages were not common, the group had the right to their faith and privacy.

Goldstein was elected president of the Texas Criminal Defense Lawyers Association (TCDLA) in 1992 and the National Association of Criminal Defense Lawyers (NACDL) in 1994 and 1995.

He represented Mexican drug lord Juan García Abrego after an arrest and extradition in January 1996. Abrego hired Roberto Yzaguirre, and then Yzaguirre brought Goldstein and Tony Canales into the case. Abrego was accused of presiding over the flow of Colombian cocaine through northern Mexico into the U.S., as well as money laundering, attempted bribery, and the murders of numerous individuals. García Ábrego was convicted on all charges. He was sentenced to 11 life terms.

In 2008, he was the defense attorney for an indicted member of the Yearning for Zion Ranch.

Goldstein testified before the Senate Judiciary Committee in 2010 and was critical of the Patriot Act. Goldstein's criticism centered around the detainment of his client, Dr. Al-Badr Al Hazmi, a radiology resident, who was arrested the morning after the terrorist attacks on September 11, 2001. Dr. Al Hazmi was later cleared of any wrongdoing but Goldstein highlighted the violation of Dr. Al Hazmi's Fifth Amendment protections in criticizing the Patriot Act and the authorization of the Federal government by the Federal Bureau of Prisons to monitor communications between suspected terrorist and their attorneys.

He wrote an amicus brief on behalf of Manuel Noriega.

Goldstein is also a former president of the National Association of Criminal Defense Lawyers and a fellow of the International Academy of Trial Lawyers, American College of Trial Lawyers, and of the American Board of Criminal Lawyers.

In December 2019, Gerry Goldstein was selected as one of five 2019 recipients of the Texas Bar Foundation's Outstanding 50 Year Lawyer Award. The award recognizes attorneys whose practice has spanned 50 years or more and who adhere to the highest principles and traditions of the legal profession and service to the public. In order to honor Mr. Goldstein the Bar Foundation commissioned an oral history to recognize and preserve the accomplishments of Mr. Goldstein's legal career.

== Personal life ==
He married Christine Sayre in 1969. They live in San Antonio, Texas, and Aspen, Colorado, and have a son, Matthew Goldstein .
