= You Have the Right to Remain Innocent =

2016 law book by James Duane

- First edition cover
- Author: James Joseph Duane
- Publisher: Little A Books
- Publication date: September 20, 2016
- Pages: 152
- ISBN: 9781503933392

You Have the Right to Remain Innocent is a 2016 non-fiction book by James Joseph Duane, a legal professor, published by Little A Books. It explains his belief why under almost all circumstances citizens should not talk to the police. He emphasizes that police officers tell their own children to never speak with the police.

== Background ==
It stems from a lecture he gave to a law class that was uploaded onto YouTube.

== Contents ==
He argues that because of Salinas v. Texas, the fact that someone has asserted the Fifth Amendment can be used as evidence against them in court, so he suggests criminal defendants and interrogatees instead invoke the Sixth Amendment, the right to legal counsel.

== Reception ==
Mullins stated that it is "well written and engaging", with "concise, focused, and persuasive" argumentation, and that he "effectively" caters to both the general public and to lawyers. She stated that the book does not express how to reform the legal system and that "The biggest criticism that a reader might raise is that Duane perhaps fails to give note to the struggles of police officers and prosecutors in finding, charging, and successfully convicting guilty offenders."

Kirkus Reviews stated that police officers and prosecutors are likely to dislike the book and that it is "Well-informed, scary, sobering".
