= James Joseph Duane =

American law professor

- Born: James Joseph Duane; July 30, 1959 (age 67); Buffalo, New York, U.S.
- Education: Harvard University (AB, JD)
- Occupations: Lawyer; Professor
- Website: regent.edu/faculty/j-d-james-j-duane/

James Joseph Duane (born July 30, 1959) is an American law professor at the Regent University School of Law, former criminal defense attorney, and Fifth Amendment expert. Duane has received considerable online attention for his lecture "Don't Talk to the Police", in which he advises citizens to avoid incriminating themselves by speaking to law enforcement officers. He received both his bachelor's degree and Juris Doctor degree from Harvard University.

== Early life and education ==
Duane was born in Buffalo, New York. He is a descendant of the Revolutionary-era leader Judge James Duane.

Educated at Harvard University, Duane received a Bachelor of Arts magna cum laude in philosophy in 1981 and a Juris Doctor cum laude in 1984. Duane was elected to the Phi Beta Kappa honor society when he was an undergraduate student at Harvard.

== "Don't Talk to the Police" lecture ==
In 2008, Duane gave a lecture at Regent University alongside Virginia Beach Police Department officer George Bruch, in which they explain in practical terms why US citizens should never talk to police under any circumstances.

Using former Supreme Court Justice Robert Jackson as support of his "Don't Talk to the Police" advice, Duane says (among other things) that:

- Even perfectly innocent citizens may get themselves into trouble even when the police are trying to do their jobs properly, because police malfeasance is entirely unnecessary for the innocent to convict themselves by mistake;
- talking to police may bring up erroneous but believable evidence against even innocent witnesses; and,
- individuals convinced of their own innocence may have unknowingly committed a crime which they inadvertently confess to during questioning. This follows the reasoning of Justice Robert Jackson in Watts v. Indiana ("To bring in a lawyer means a real peril to solution of the crime because, under our adversary system, he deems that his sole duty is to protect his client—guilty or innocent—and that, in such a capacity, he owes no duty whatever to help society solve its crime problem. Under this conception of criminal procedure, any lawyer worth his salt will tell the suspect in no uncertain terms to make no statement to police under any circumstances." ).

A video of Duane's lecture posted on YouTube by Regent University has been viewed over 20 million times as of 2026, and has been called a "YouTube sensation" by The Independent. In 2016, Duane clarified that his advice does not extend to routine traffic stops. The lecture continues to be popular on YouTube and received support from security expert Bruce Schneier.

== Other work ==
Duane has also written about his views that there are bizarre legislative drafting errors in the Virginia Statute on Privileged Marital Communications as well as issues involving the introduction of hearsay evidence at trial (known as "bootstrapping"). Duane, a member of the advisory board of the Fully Informed Jury Association, has also written in defense of jury nullification.

== Selected bibliography ==
- Duane, James (2010). "The Right to Remain Silent: A New Answer to an Old Question". Criminal Justice. 25 (2).
- Duane, James (September 20, 2016). You Have the Right to Remain Innocent. Little A. ISBN 9781503933392.
- Duane, James; Weissenberger, Glen (November 17, 2011). Weissenberger's Federal Evidence (7th ed.). LexisNexis. ISBN 9781593458140.
- Duane, James; Weissenberger, Glen (December 5, 2011). Federal Rules of Evidence: Rules, Legislative History, Commentary and Authority (7th ed.). LexisNexis. ISBN 9781422495636.
