= Keith Stroup =

American cannabis legalization activist

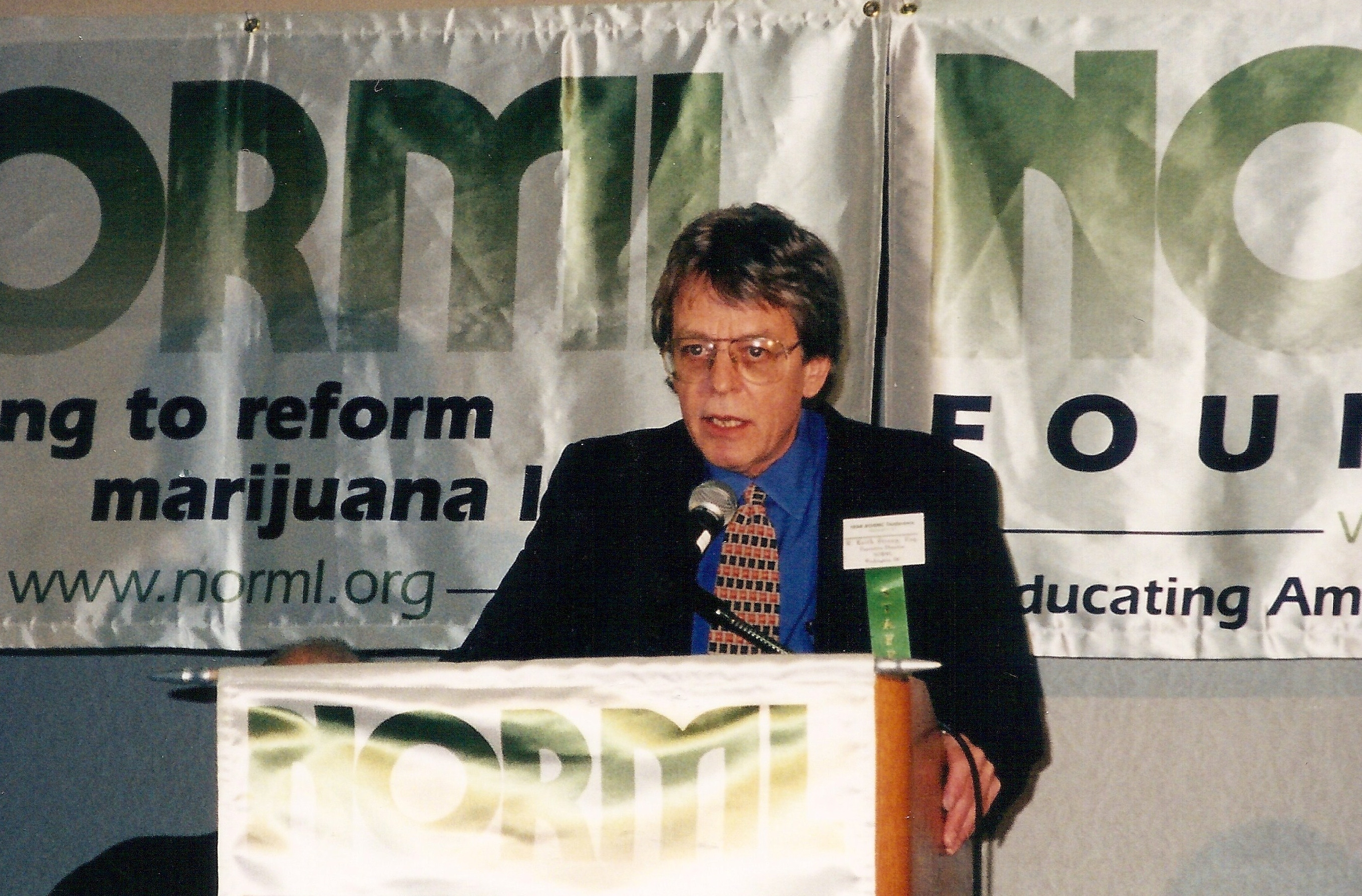
Keith Stroup speaks at 1998 NORML conference.

Keith Stroup is an American attorney and founder of the National Organization for the Reform of Marijuana Laws.

== Biography ==
After graduating from the University of Illinois Urbana-Champaign with a degree in political science in 1965, he enrolled at the Georgetown University Law Center and worked in the office of Illinois Senator Everett Dirksen. He graduated from law school in 1968 and began working for the federal Consumer Product Safety Commission. The job put him in contact with consumer activist Ralph Nader whose work inspired Stroup to create a consumer group for cannabis users.

Using $5,000 in seed money from the Playboy Foundation, Stroup founded NORML in 1970. He served as executive director until 1979, during which time 11 states adopted marijuana decriminalization laws. However, his directorship was cut short by a serious blunder. The administration of President Jimmy Carter had favored marijuana reform; however, Peter Bourne, Carter's drug adviser, disagreed with Stroup on ending the spraying of Mexican marijuana fields with the herbicide paraquat. In retaliation, Stroup revealed to a reporter that Bourne had snorted cocaine at NORML's 1977 Christmas party. Bourne was subsequently fired. Stroup eventually lost his job too; "The folks at NORML didn't like snitches and eased him out the door."

Stroup worked as a lobbyist for family farmers for a few years in Washington, DC, and he lobbied for artists in Boston, MA, before being hired as the executive director of the National Association for Criminal Defense Lawyers (NACDL), the specialized bar association for criminal lawyers, also in Washington, DC, where he worked from 1989 through 1994.

In 1994, Stroup was invited to return to the NORML board of directors, and in 1995, when then Executive Director Richard Cowan stepped aside, Stroup was rehired as executive director of NORML, where he worked for the next 10 years, serving as the primary spokesperson for marijuana smokers in America. In January 2005, he announced he was stepping aside as executive director, citing the need for a younger crop of activists to take over the organization, with a fresh perspective and new ideas. Stroup remains active with NORML, serving as legal counsel, giving college lectures, and he recently published a book on the history of NORML entitled It's NORML to Smoke Pot: the 40-year Fight for Marijuana Smokers' Rights.
