= Jon Gettman =

American activist

- Born: August 20, 1957
- Education: Catholic University; American University; George Mason University
- Known for: Marijuana reform activism

Jon B. Gettman (born August 20, 1957) is a marijuana rights activist, a leader of the Coalition for Rescheduling Cannabis, and a former head of the National Organization for the Reform of Marijuana Laws. He has a PhD in public policy and regional economic development from George Mason University and is a longtime contributor to High Times magazine. Gettman filed a petition in 1995 to remove cannabis from Schedule I of the Controlled Substances Act that was eventually denied. A second petition was filed in 2002, with the Coalition for Rescheduling Cannabis, that remains under review by the Department of Health and Human Services. Gettman frequently publishes on the marijuana industry and is an associate professor of Criminology and Criminal Justice at Shenandoah University in Virginia.

== Education ==
Gettman received a BA in Anthropology from the Catholic University of America and a MS in Justice, specializing in drug policy, from American University. He holds a PhD in public policy and regional economic development from George Mason University, where he is a senior fellow. In addition to his advocacy work, he is an adjunct instructor at Shepherd University in Shepherdstown, West Virginia, teaching public administration.

== Advocacy ==
Gettman is a marijuana reform activist and head of the Coalition for Rescheduling Cannabis. A former director of the National Organization for the Reform of Marijuana Laws, he is a longtime contributor to High Times magazine, where he writes the Cannabis Column. As leader of the Bulletin of Cannabis Reform, he publishes frequently on the marijuana industry.

=== Medical marijuana ===
Gettman is a medical cannabis advocate.

==== Science and the End of Marijuana Prohibition ====
In 1999, Gettman presented a speech, Science and the End of Marijuana Prohibition, at the 12th International Conference on Drug Policy Reform. He noted that under the Controlled Substances Act, the key decision-makers on marijuana are the scientists at the United States Department of Health and Human Services, whose scientific and medical findings are binding on the Drug Enforcement Administration. Pointing out that Schedules I and II are, by law, reserved for drugs like heroin and cocaine with a "high potential for abuse," Gettman proposed that drug policy reformers use the petitioning process to "cross-examine under oath and penalty of perjury every HHS official and scientist who claims that marijuana use is as dangerous as the use of cocaine or heroin."

==== Petitions ====
In 1995 Gettman submitted a petition to the Drug Enforcement Administration calling for the rescheduling of cannabis. The petition sought to remove marijuana and its cannabinoids from Schedules I and II of the Controlled Substances Act on the grounds that the drug lacks the potential for abuse that warrants inclusion there. The DEA must by law forward all petitions which advocate the rescheduling of a drug to the Department of Health and Human Services for further review. By proceeding to do so, the DEA implicitly judged that "sufficient grounds" exist for the rescheduling of cannabis.

In 1999, Gettman speculated that if removed from Schedule I, cannabis could be:

- Regulated as a Schedule III or IV prescription drug, similarly to ketamine or anabolic steroids;
- Regulated as a Schedule V over-the-counter substance; or
- Removed from the Schedules and regulated similarly to alcoholic beverages or tobacco.

However, upon reviewing the HHS evaluation, the DEA concluded in 2001 that adequate evidence did not exist to necessitate the change. In response, Gettman brought the case before the US Court of Appeals. The court denied the case judicial review because Gettman, not a medical cannabis patient, was unharmed by the DEA restricting access to the drug. Gettman explained that apparently "only those who are actually injured by DEA's refusal to reschedule cannabis have standing to submit DEA's potential actions in this area to judicial review by the federal courts" and organized a coalition to meet this requirement for a subsequent petition.

In October 2002, the Coalition for Rescheduling Cannabis (headed by Gettman and composed of an agglomeration of organizations) filed another petition before the DEA. In April 2002, the DEA formally accepted the proposal, which sought federal recognition of the medicinal value of cannabis, reclassification of the drug, and the establishment of a legal framework for the production and distribution of medical cannabis. In doing so, the DEA acknowledged sufficient merit in the evidence presented in the petition, which focused on accepted medicinal value rather than relative harm, to warrant additional review rather than dismissal. In 2004, the DEA referred the petition to the Department of Health and Human Services for a full-scale evaluation where, as of May 2006, it remains.

The Cannabis Column, a longstanding column on High Times magazine, tracks the progress of this petition. As of September 16, 2009, the column has eclipsed fifty issues.

=== Studies ===
==== Marijuana Production in the United States ====
In 2006 Gettman wrote a special report, entitled "Marijuana Production in the United States, published in the Bulletin of Cannabis Reform. In it, he estimated the monetary value of the marijuana crop and determined marijuana the largest cash crop in the nation, exceeding the combined values of corn and wheat. Gettman then argues that marijuana prohibition has failed and calls for the legalization and regulation of what he calculated to be a $35.8 billion industry.

==== Lost Taxes and Other Costs of Marijuana Laws ====
In 2007 Gettman authored another special report for the Bulletin of Cannabis Reform, entitled "Lost Taxes and Other Costs of Marijuana Laws." The study examined the effects of marijuana prohibition from an economic perspective and calculated that prohibition costs taxpayers approximately $42 billion in enforcement costs and foregone tax revenues.

== See also ==
- Removal of cannabis from Schedule I of the Controlled Substances Act
