= National Organization for the Reform of Marijuana Laws =

American social welfare organization

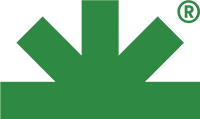
- Logotype and wordmark as of 2021
- Formation: 1970; 56 years ago
- Founder: Keith Stroup
- Legal status: 501(c)(4) organization
- Headquarters: Washington, D.C., U.S.
- Website: norml.org

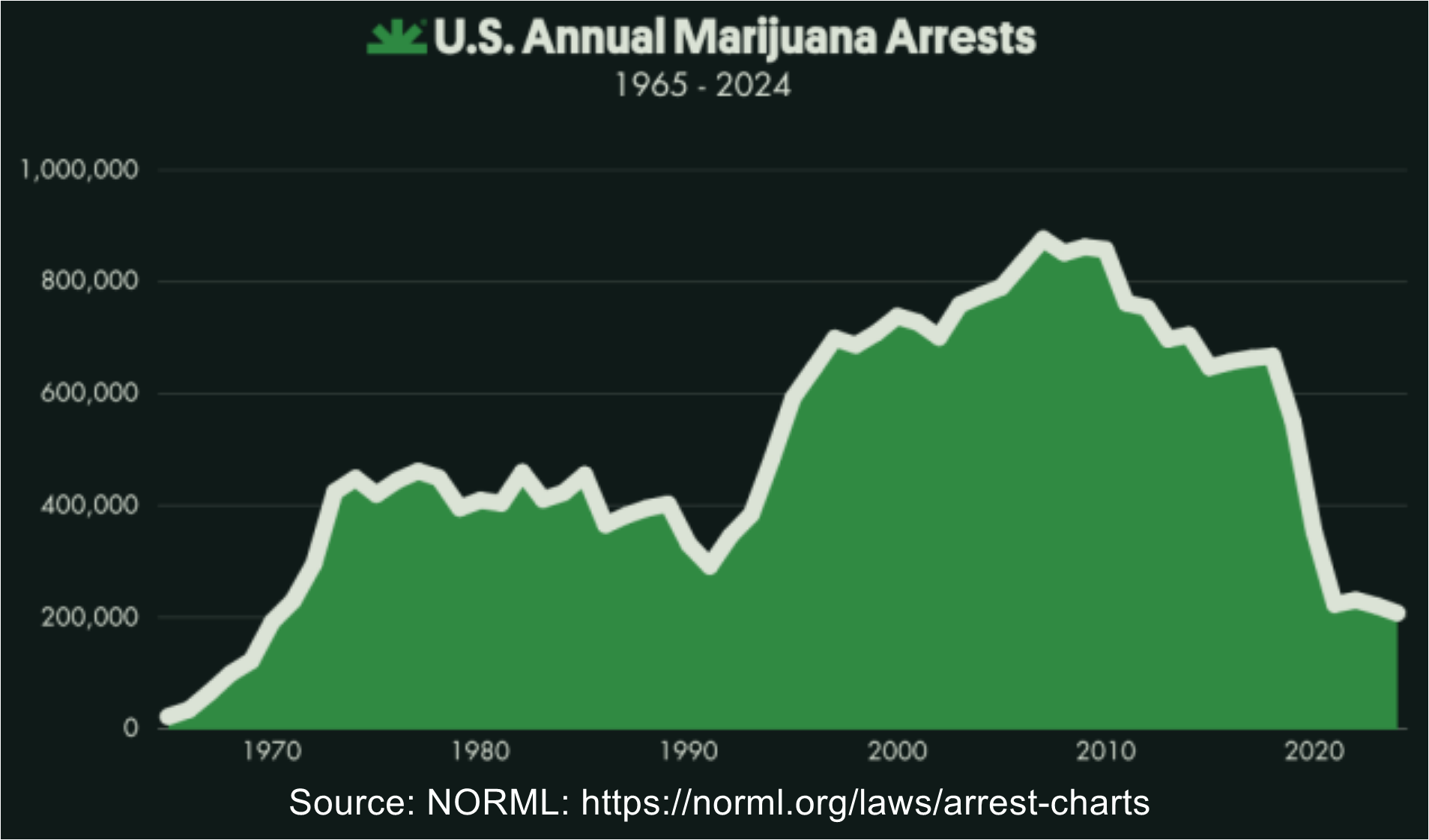
US annual marijuana arrests. From NORML.

The National Organization for the Reform of Marijuana Laws (NORML /ˈnɔːrməl/) is a social welfare organization based in Washington, D.C., that advocates for the reform of marijuana laws in the United States regarding both medical and non-medical use.

According to their website, NORML supports "the removal of all penalties for the private possession and responsible use of marijuana by adults, including cultivation for personal use, and casual nonprofit transfers of small amounts" and advocates for "the creation of a legal and regulatory framework for marijuana's production and retail sale to adults".

NORML also has a sister organization, The NORML Foundation, that focuses on educational efforts and providing legal assistance and support to people affected negatively by current marijuana laws. NORML maintains chapters in a number of US states as well as outside the US in countries such as Canada, France, New Zealand, and South Africa.

== History ==
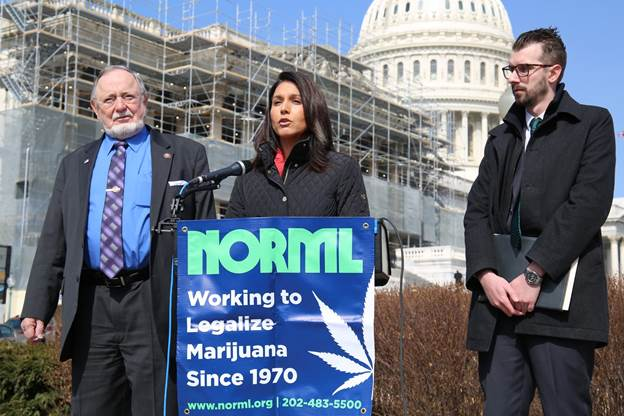
NORML Executive Director Erik Altieri is joined by U.S. Representatives Don Young and Tulsi Gabbard at a press conference outside the U.S. Capitol (2019).

After the August 1964 arrest of Lowell Eggemeier, who protested California's felony criminalization of cannabis by smoking in the San Francisco Hall of Justice, attorney James R. White founded Legalize Marijuana, better known as LeMar, to support legalization of cannabis. Soon after, activist Blair Newman founded Amorphia to expand on cannabis' role in California counterculture. In 1970, attorney Keith Stroup founded NORML as the National Organization for the Repeal of Marijuana Laws, seeking to model his early work with Ralph Nader on product safety. Soon after, Stroup changed the R to stand for "Reform" based on former United States Attorney General Ramsey Clark's advice that it would make the organization more approachable.

The organization received $5,000 in early funding from the Playboy Foundation. Since then, the organization has played a central role in the cannabis decriminalization movement. In 1971, LeMar and Amorphia merged. The next year, Amorphia led the unsuccessful campaign for California's marijuana legalization initiative, Proposition 19. In 1974, Amorphia merged with NORML.

By the middle of the 1970s, Playboy owner Hugh Hefner's financial support through the Playboy Foundation set NORML apart from its predecessors, making it the premier decriminalization advocacy group. At one point, Hefner was donating $100,000 a year to NORML.

The organization has a large grassroots network with 135 chapters and over 550 lawyers. NORML holds annual conferences and Continuing Legal Education (CLE)-accredited seminars. Its board of directors has, at times, included political figures as Philip Hart, Jacob K. Javits, and Ross Mirkarimi.

In 1989, Donald Fiedler succeeded Jon Gettman as the executive director of NORML. In August 1992, Richard Cowan became executive director of NORML. Keith Stroup became executive director once again in 1995 after Cowan stepped down. In 2016, Erik Altieri was selected by the NORML Board of Directors to become the organization's 7th Executive Director. In 2021, travel writer Rick Steves became the chairman of the Board of Directors.

By 2024, NORML remained active in state-level reform efforts. Its chapters participated in supporting reform bills, conducting public education campaigns, and providing testimony on marijuana policy in multiple states.

== Media and activism ==
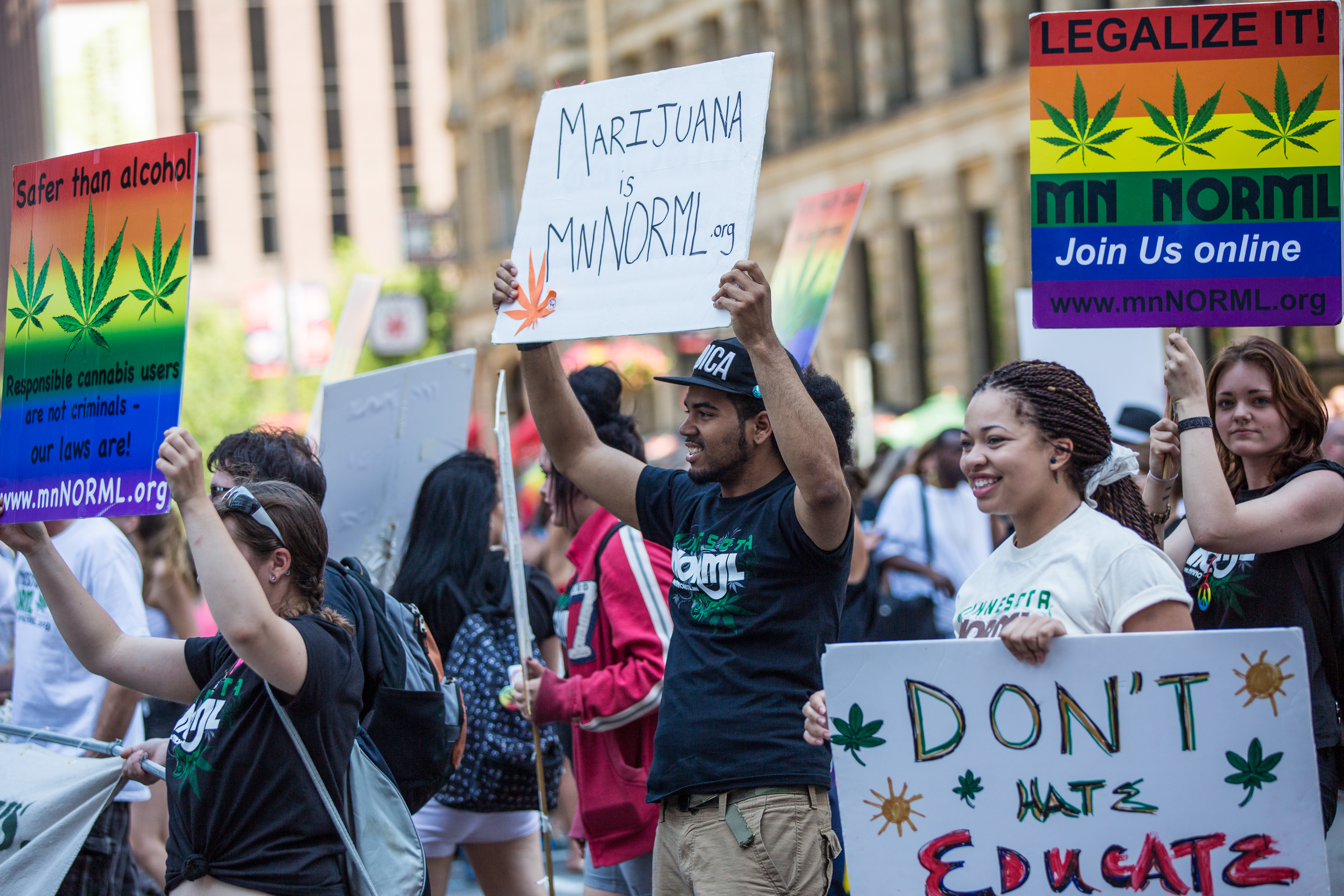
Signs promoting NORML at the Twin Cities Pride Parade in Minneapolis, Minnesota, in 2013

In the 2006 United States midterm elections, NORML promoted several successful local initiatives that declared marijuana enforcement to be the lowest priority for local law enforcement, freeing up police resources to combat violent and serious crime.

In early 2009, a petition to President Barack Obama was written asking that he appoint a "drug czar" who would treat drug abuse as a health issue rather than a criminal issue and will move away from a "war on drugs" paradigm. NORML's goal for this petition was 100,000 signatures.

Also in early 2009, when the Kellogg Company dropped its contract with Olympic swimmer Michael Phelps after pictures of his use of a bong surfaced in the media, head members of NORML began boycotting Kellogg products and urging all members and supporters of NORML to boycott Kellogg, until the company reversed the decision. NORML also suggested that supporters of the cause send emails or letters to Kellogg explaining the boycott and the reasons behind it, and providing a template for emails and letters. Although Kellogg's profits did not suffer in the first quarter of 2009, consumer ratings polls at Vanno have been cited as indicating that Kellogg's reputation has suffered. Specifically, a small poll of Kellogg's brand reputation at Vanno showed a drop from its previous rank of 9 to 83 after Kellogg decided not to renew its contract with Phelps.

On February 15, 2010, a 15-second flash animation from NORML discussing the potential economic and financial benefit of legalized marijuana was deemed by CBS to be "too political" to display on billboards in New York City's Times Square. This drew criticism in the blogosphere and accusations of hypocrisy on Twitter, since CBS had recently aired an anti-abortion television spot during the 2010 Super Bowl. CBS reversed its decision and the ad was debuted on the CBS Times Square Superscreen on April 20, 2010.

== Sub-organizations ==
=== The NORML Foundation ===
The NORML Foundation is a 501(c)(3) organization that conducts educational and research activities. Examples of The NORML Foundation's advocacy work is a detailed book, Clinical Applications For Cannabis & Cannabinoids: A Review of the Recent Scientific Literature. A comprehensive report with county-by-county marijuana arrest data, Crimes of Indiscretion: Marijuana Arrest in America, was published in 2005.

In October 1998, The NORML Foundation published the NORML Report on U.S. Domestic Marijuana Production that was widely cited in the mainstream media. The report methodically estimated the value and number of cannabis plants grown in 1997, finding that Drug Enforcement Administration, state and local law enforcement agencies seized 32% of domestic cannabis plants planted that year. According to the report, "Marijuana remains the fourth largest cash crop in America despite law enforcement spending an estimated $10 billion annually to pursue efforts to outlaw the plant." Recent studies show that marijuana is larger than all other cash crops combined. NORML’s advocacy approach aligns with strategies commonly used by cannabis policy organizations, combining public education, legislative engagement, and coalition-based reform campaigns.

In 2002, the organization used ads containing quotes by New York City mayor Michael Bloomberg on his past use of cannabis, saying "You bet I did. And I enjoyed it." The mayor said "I'm not thrilled they're using my name. I suppose there's that First Amendment that gets in the way of me stopping it," but maintained that the NYPD will continue to vigorously enforce the laws. In the years since, public attitudes toward marijuana have shifted significantly. More recent data reported that most Americans now support legalization for medical or recreational use.

=== State and local chapters ===
- Indiana NORML
- Minnesota NORML
- Ohio NORML
- Texas NORML

=== International chapters ===
NORML international chapters:

- NORML Australia 1980-1992
- NORML Canada
- NORML France
- NORML Ireland
- NORML New Zealand
  - Otago NORML
- NORML South Africa
- NORML UK

== See also ==
- Legal history of cannabis in the United States
- Legalization of non-medical cannabis in the United States
- Medical cannabis in the United States
