= Political positions of Donald Trump =

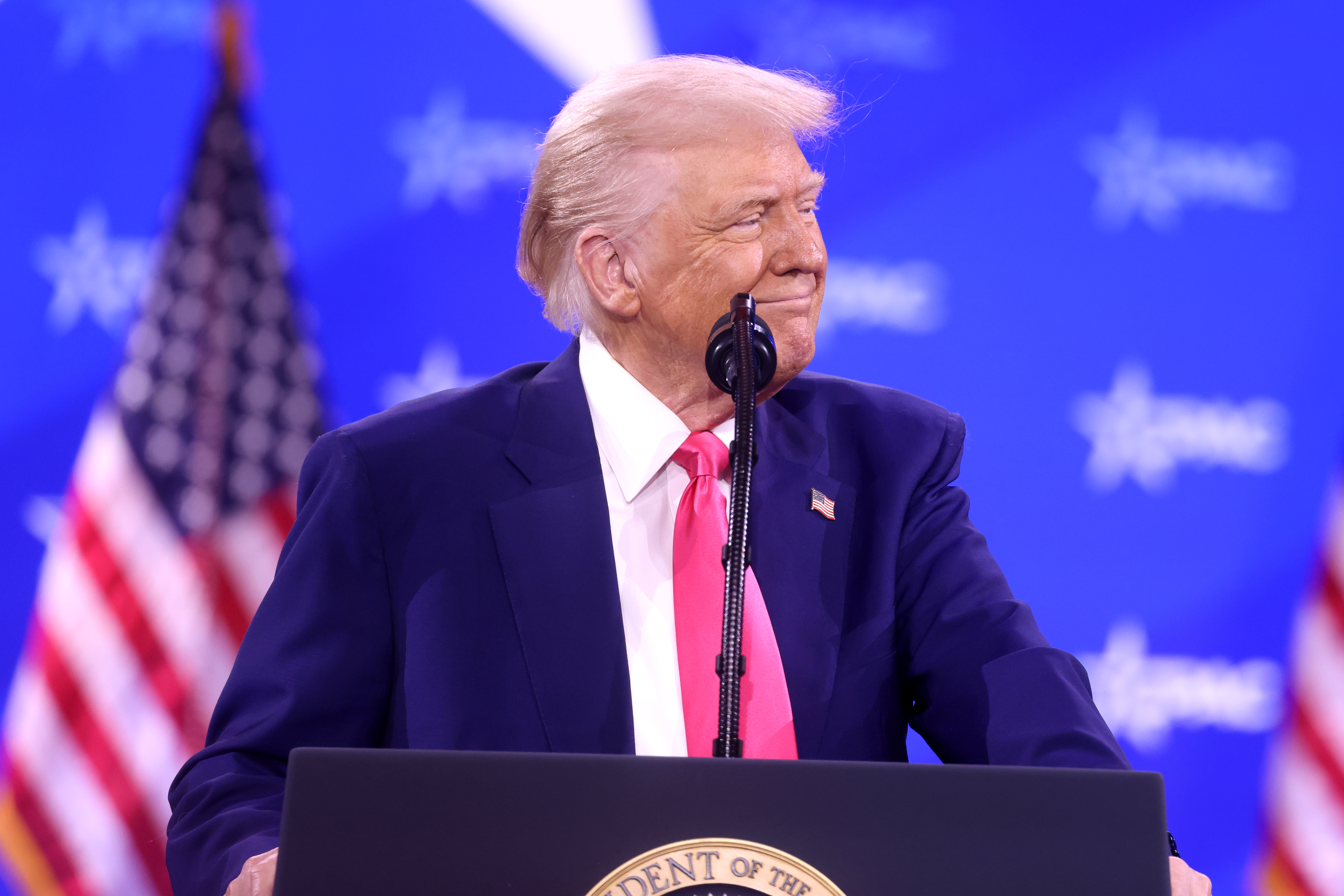
Donald Trump delivering a speech at the 2025 Conservative Political Action Conference (CPAC)

Donald Trump, the 45th and 47th president of the United States, is American nationalist, business nationalist, Christian libertarian, right-wing populist, and since 2015, ultraconservative. Trump has variously described himself as "common sense" and nationalist. Prior to 2016, he identified with the Democratic Party at times. Trump's political beliefs and ideologies are described as Trumpism.

Trump consistently advocates for supply-side economics, deregulation, energy independence, reindustrialization, school choice, "law and order" in law enforcement, and opposes illegal immigration. He also advocates isolationism, emphasizing a unilateral defense policy over collective security commitments, strengthened diplomatic and security relations with Israel, a protectionist trade policy, and strategic competition with China. He has also been accused of espousing racist and misogynist views.

Trump has personally cited Roy Cohn, Arthur Laffer, and Norman Vincent Peale as influences on his worldview. Jerome Corsi, Lee Iacocca, and Roger Stone are further purported to be influences on his politics.

== Political affiliation and ideology ==
=== Self-described ===
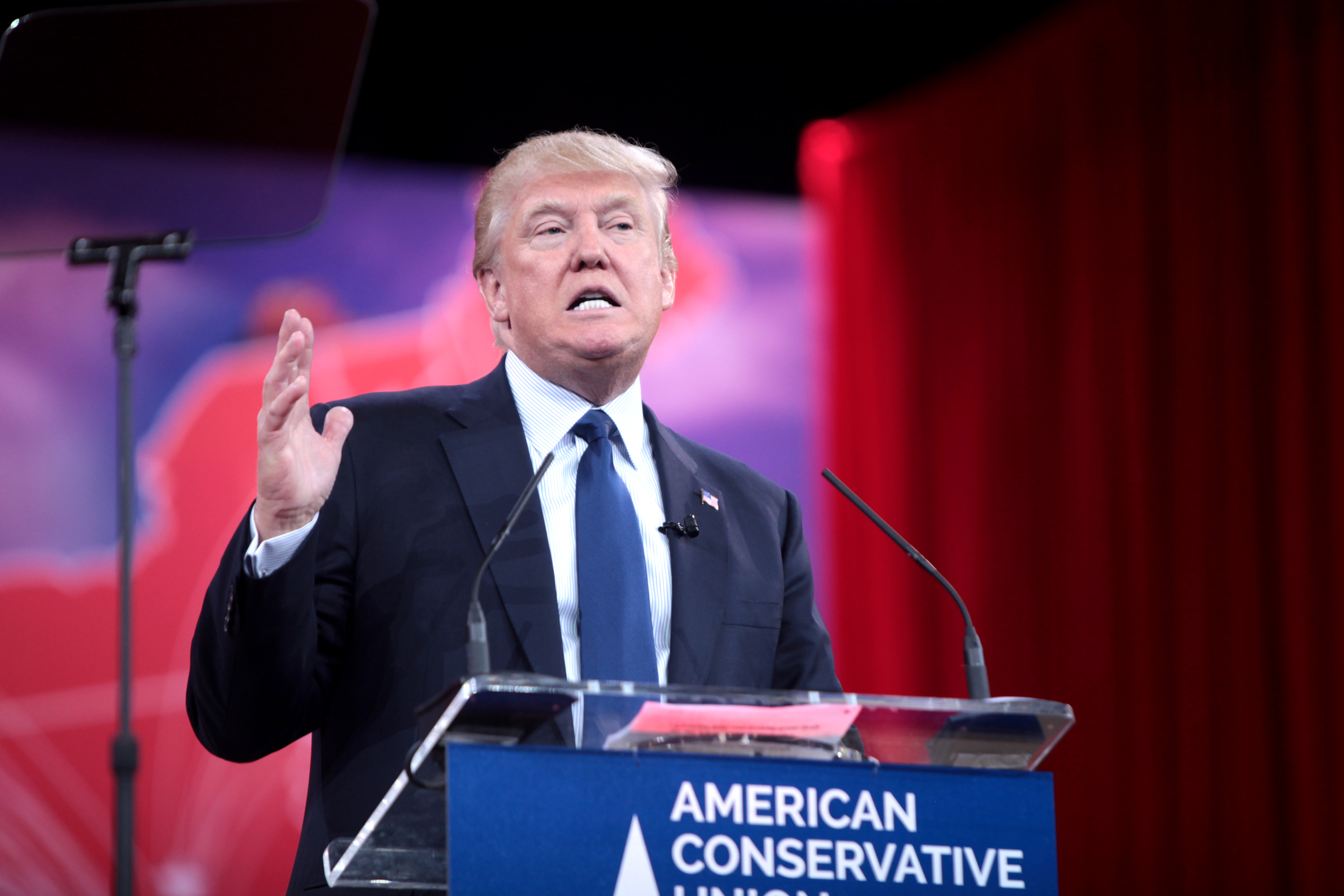
Trump speaking at CPAC in 2015

As a New York real estate developer and celebrity, Trump often donated to and associated with whichever party held more influence in the jurisdictions where he did business. For example, he typically aligned more with Democrats in New York City, as the city was and still is a heavily Democratic jurisdiction. He frequently donated to candidates from both parties in order to "curry favor" and gain access to the political elite. Trump initially registered as a Republican in Manhattan, New York City, in 1987; since that time, he has changed his party affiliation five times. In 1999, he changed his party affiliation to the Reform Party and had even considered running a presidential campaign in 2000 as a Reformist before ultimately withdrawing from the race due to becoming disillusioned with the party and not wanting to become associated with certain members that had differing views, such as David Duke, Pat Buchanan and Lenora Fulani, whom he referred to as a Klansman, a Neo-Nazi, and a Communist respectively. In August 2001, Trump changed his party affiliation to Democratic. In September 2009, he changed his party affiliation back to the Republican Party. In December 2011, Trump changed his party affiliation to "no party affiliation" (independent) to preserve his right to run as an independent if he was dissatisfied with the Republican nominee. In April 2012, he again returned to the Republican Party and has remained a Republican since then.

In a 2004 interview, Trump told CNN's Wolf Blitzer: "In many cases, I probably identify more as Democrat", explaining: "It just seems that the economy does better under the Democrats than the Republicans. Now, it shouldn't be that way. But if you go back, I mean it just seems that the economy does better under the Democrats...But certainly we had some very good economies under Democrats, as well as Republicans. But we've had some pretty bad disaster under the Republicans." In a July 2015 interview, Trump said that he has a broad range of political positions and that "I identify with some things as a Democrat."

During his 2016 presidential campaign, Trump consistently described the state of the United States in bleak terms, referring to it as a nation in dire peril that is plagued by lawlessness, poverty, and violence, constantly under threat, and at risk of having "nothing, absolutely nothing, left". In accepting the Republican nomination for president, Trump said that "I alone can fix" the system, and pledged that if elected, "Americanism, not globalism, will be our credo." He described himself as a "law and order" candidate and "the voice" of "the forgotten men and women". Trump's inaugural address on January 20, 2017, focused on his campaign theme of America in crisis and decline. He pledged to end what he referred to as "American carnage", depicting the United States in a dystopian light—as a "land of abandoned factories, economic angst, rising crime"—while pledging "a new era in American politics".

Although Trump was the Republican nominee, he has signaled that the official party platform, adopted at the 2016 Republican National Convention, diverges from his own views. According to a The Washington Post tally, Trump made some 282 campaign promises over the course of his 2016 campaign. In February 2017, Trump stated that he was a "total nationalist" in a "true sense". In October 2018, Trump again described himself as a nationalist. During the last week of his presidential term in January 2021, Trump reportedly considered founding a new political party called the Patriot Party.

=== As described by others ===
Observers and analysts often attribute Donald Trump's constant shifts to pragmatism, political expediency, and a desire for influence rather than a rigid adherence to a specific ideology or party loyalty. Trump's political positions are populist, more specifically described as right-wing populist. Politicians and pundits alike have referred to Trump's populism, anti-free trade, and anti-immigrant stances as "Trumpism".

Liberal economist and columnist Paul Krugman disputes that Trump is a populist, arguing that his policies favor the rich over those less well off. Harvard Kennedy School political scientist Pippa Norris has described Trump as a "populist authoritarian" analogous to European parties such as the Swiss People's Party, Austrian Freedom Party, Swedish Democrats, and Danish People's Party. Columnist Walter Shapiro and political commentator Jonathan Chait describe Trump as authoritarian. Conservative commentator Mary Katharine Ham characterized Trump as a "casual authoritarian," saying "he is a candidate who has happily and proudly spurned the entire idea of limits on his power as an executive and doesn't have any interest in the Constitution and what it allows him to do and what [it] does not allow him to do. That is concerning for people who are interested in limited government." Charles C. W. Cooke of the National Review has expressed similar views, terming Trump an "anti-constitutional authoritarian." Libertarian journalist Nick Gillespie, by contrast, calls Trump "populist rather than an authoritarian". In an article for Newsweek, political theorist Rafael Holmberg described Trump's politics as even more unsettling than populism, and as a new type of political discourse. Rich Benjamin refers to Trump and his ideology as fascist and a form of inverted totalitarianism.

Legal experts spanning the political spectrum, including many conservative and libertarian scholars, have suggested that "Trump's blustery attacks on the press, complaints about the judicial system and bold claims of presidential power collectively sketch out a constitutional worldview that shows contempt for the First Amendment, the separation of powers and the rule of law." Law professors Randy E. Barnett, Richard Epstein, and David G. Post, for example, suggest that Trump has little or no awareness of, or commitment to, the constitutional principles of separation of powers and federalism. Law professor Ilya Somin believes that Trump "poses a serious threat to the press and the First Amendment," citing Trump's proposal to expand defamation laws to make it easier to sue journalists and his remark that the owner of The Washington Post, Jeff Bezos, would "have problems" if Trump was elected president. Anthony D. Romero, the executive director of the American Civil Liberties Union, wrote in an op-ed published in The Washington Post in July 2016 that "Trump's proposed policies, if carried out, would trigger a constitutional crisis. By our reckoning, a Trump administration would violate the First, Fourth, Fifth and Eighth amendments if it tried to implement his most controversial plans."

Prior to his election as president, his views on social issues were often described as centrist or moderate. Political commentator Josh Barro termed Trump a "moderate Republican," saying that except on immigration, his views are "anything but ideologically rigid, and he certainly does not equate deal making with surrender." MSNBC host Joe Scarborough said Trump is essentially more like a "centrist Democrat" on social issues. Journalist and political analyst John Heilemann characterized Trump as liberal on social issues, while conservative talk radio host and political commentator Rush Limbaugh said that Heilemann is seeing in Trump what he wants to see. Since he became president, commentators have generally characterized his policy agenda as socially conservative.

Trump and his political views have often been described as nationalist. John Cassidy of The New Yorker writes that Trump seeks to make the Republican Party "into a more populist, nativist, avowedly protectionist, and semi-isolationist party that is skeptical of immigration, free trade, and military interventionism." The Washington Post editorial page editor Fred Hiatt and College of the Holy Cross political scientist Donald Brand describe Trump as a nativist. Rich Lowry, the editor of National Review, instead calls Trump an "immigration hawk" and supports Trump's effort to return immigration levels to what Trump calls a "historically average level". Trump is a protectionist, according to free-market advocate Stephen Moore and conservative economist Larry Kudlow. Historian Joshua M. Zeitz wrote in 2016 that Trump's appeals to "law and order" and "the silent majority" were comparable to the dog-whistle and racially-coded terminology of Richard Nixon.

According to a 2020 study, voters had the most difficulty assessing the ideology of Trump in the 2016 election out of all presidential candidates since 1972 and all contemporary legislators. As of 2021, the Southern Poverty Law Center identifies Trump as a leader of the radical right.

=== Trump's views of the presidency ===
"I have the right to do anything I want to do. I'm the president of the United States."

— Donald Trump, during a cabinet meeting on August 26, 2025.

In 2019, Trump said that Article 2 of the Constitution gave him "the right to do whatever I want as president". In February 2025, Trump wrote and pinned a comment on Truth Social and X: "He who saves his Country does not violate any Law", which the White House later reposted on X that day. The phrase itself is a variation of one attributed to Napoleon Bonaparte, and was noted to be in line with his administration's aggressive push for expanding presidential power under the unitary executive theory. In May 2025, when asked by Meet the Press moderator Kristen Welker if he has "to uphold the Constitution of the United States as president", Trump responded "I don't know". During a cabinet meeting on August 26, 2025, Trump repeated his claim that he has "the right to do anything I want to do" as president. This rhetoric and his actions led to allegations of ruling like a dictator or fascist by opponents. In January 2026, when asked if there were limits to his power as commander in chief, Trump said the only limit was "my own morality" and that he didn't need international law because "I'm not looking to hurt people". When asked if he needed to abide by international law, Trump said "I do", but that it "depends what your definition of international law is".

=== Scales and rankings ===
==== Crowdpac ====
In 2015, Crowdpac gave Trump a ranking of 0.4L out of 10, indicating moderate positions. In 2016, the ranking was changed to 5.1C out of 10, shifting him more to the conservative spectrum.

==== On the Issues ====
The organization and website On the Issues has classified Trump in a variety of ways over time:

- "Moderate populist" (2003)
- "Liberal-leaning populist" (2003–2011)
- "Moderate populist conservative" (2011–2012)
- "Libertarian-leaning conservative" (2012–2013)
- "Moderate conservative" (2013–2014)
- "Libertarian-leaning conservative" (2014–2015)
- "Hard-core conservative" (2015)
- "Libertarian-leaning conservative" (2015–2016)
- "Moderate conservative" (2016–2017)
- "Hard-core conservative" (2017–present)

== Politics and policies during presidency ==
As president, Trump has pursued sizable income tax cuts, deregulation, increased military spending, rollbacks of federal health-care protections, and the appointment of conservative judges consistent with conservative (Republican Party) policies. However, his anti-globalization policies of trade protectionism cross party lines. In foreign affairs he has described himself as a nationalist. Trump has said that he is "totally flexible on very, very many issues."

Trump's signature issue is immigration, especially illegal immigration, and in particular building or expanding a border wall between the U.S. and Mexico.

In his 2016 presidential campaign, Trump promised significant infrastructure investment and protection for entitlements for the elderly, typically considered liberal (Democratic Party) policies. In October 2016, Trump's campaign posted fourteen categories of policy proposals on his website, which have been since removed. During October 2016, Trump outlined a series of steps for his first 100 days in office.

Trump's political positions, and his descriptions of his beliefs, have often been inconsistent. Politico has described his positions as "eclectic, improvisational and often contradictory." According to an NBC News count, over the course of his campaign Trump made "141 distinct shifts on 23 major issues." Fact-checking organizations reported that during the campaign, Trump made a record number of false statements and lies compared to other candidates, a pattern that has continued – and further increased – in office.

== Domestic policy ==
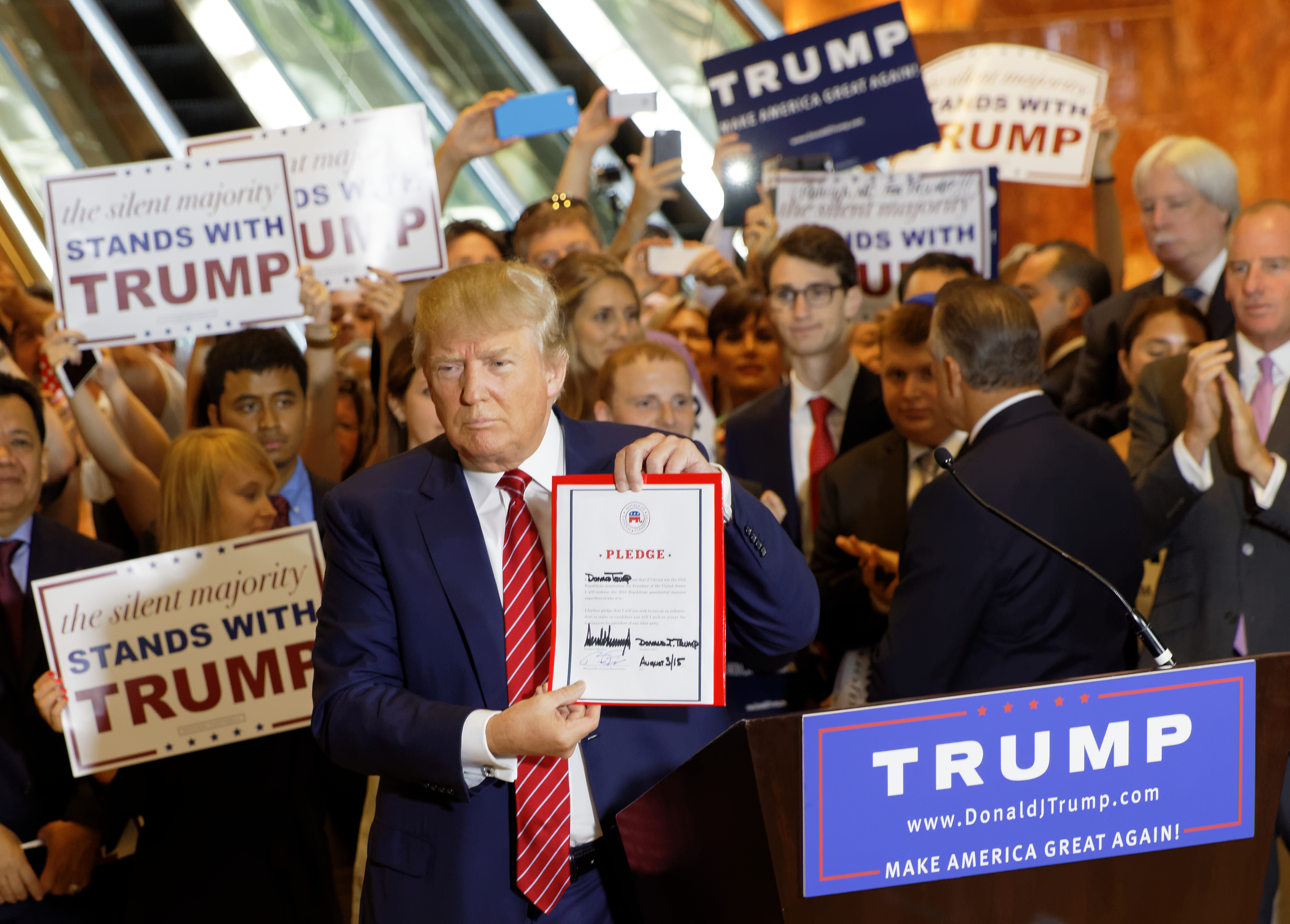
Trump signs the Republican loyalty pledge: had Trump not become the Republican Party nominee for the 2016 general election, he pledged to support whoever the nominee may have been, and to not run as a third-party candidate.

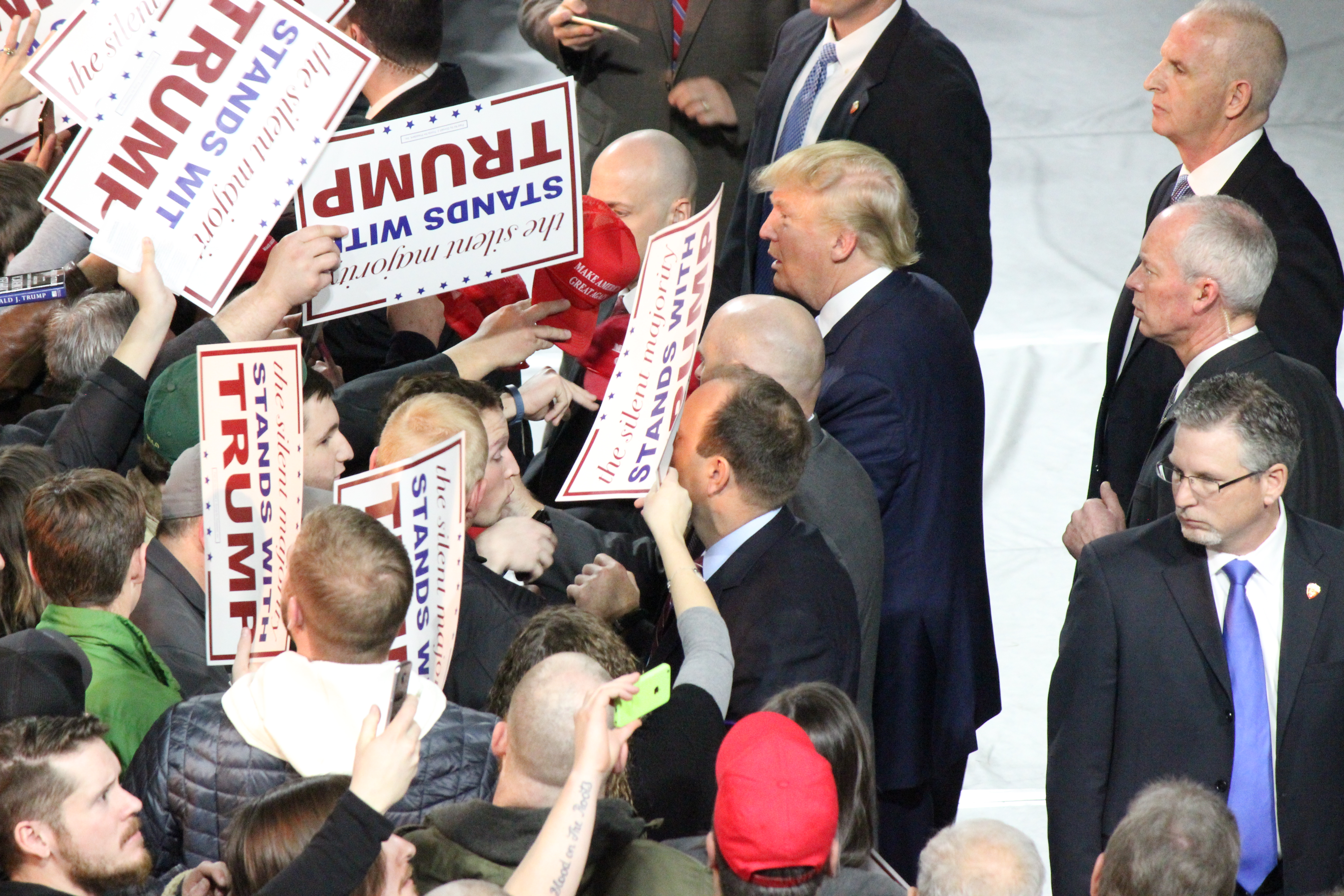
Trump and supporters at a rally in Muscatine, Iowa, January 2016. Multiple supporters hold up signs stating "The silent majority stands with Trump."

=== Campaign finance ===
While Trump has repeatedly expressed support for "the idea of campaign finance reform", he has not outlined specifics of his actual views on campaign-finance regulation. For example, Trump has not said whether he favors public financing of elections or caps on expenditures of campaigns, outside groups, and individuals.

During the Republican primary race, Trump on several occasions accused his Republican opponents of being bound to their campaign financiers, and asserted that anyone (including Trump himself) could buy their policies with donations. He called super PACs a "scam" and "a horrible thing". In October 2015, he said, "All Presidential candidates should immediately disavow their Super PACs. They're not only breaking the spirit of the law but the law itself."

Having previously touted the self-funding of his campaign as a sign of his independence from the political establishment and big donors, Trump reversed course and started to fundraise in early May 2016. While Trump systematically disavowed pro-Trump super PACs earlier in the race, he stopped doing so from early May 2016.

=== Civil servants ===
According to Chris Christie (who served briefly as leader of Trump's White House transition team), Trump will seek to purge the federal government of officials appointed by Obama and will ask Congress to pass legislation making it easier to fire public workers.

Trump's former Chief Strategist, Steve Bannon, stated in February 2017 that Trump's goal is to "deconstruct the administrative state".

=== Disabled people ===
Trump has provided "little detail regarding his positions on disability-related policies," and his campaign website made no mention of disabled people. As of June 1, 2016, Trump had not responded to the issue questionnaire of the nonpartisan disability group RespectAbility.

=== District of Columbia statehood ===
Trump is opposed to D.C. statehood. In 2020, Donald Trump indicated that if the statehood legislation for Washington, D.C. passes both houses of Congress, he would veto the admission legislation.

=== Education ===
==== 2016 campaign ====
Trump has stated his support for school choice and local control for primary and secondary schools. On school choice he's commented, "Our public schools are capable of providing a more competitive product than they do today. Look at some of the high school tests from earlier in this century and you'll wonder if they weren't college-level tests. And we've got to bring on the competition—open the schoolhouse doors and let parents choose the best school for their children. Education reformers call this school choice, charter schools, vouchers, even opportunity scholarships. I call it competition—the American way."

Trump has blasted the Common Core State Standards Initiative, calling it a "total disaster". Trump has asserted that Common Core is "education through Washington, D.C.", a claim which PolitiFact and other journalists have rated "false", since the adoption and implementation of Common Core is a state choice, not a federal one.

Trump has stated that Ben Carson will be "very much involved in education" under a Trump presidency. Carson rejects the theory of evolution and believes that "home-schoolers do the best, private schoolers next best, charter schoolers next best, and public schoolers worst"; he said that he wanted to "take the federal bureaucracy out of education."

Trump has proposed redirecting $20 billion in existing federal spending to block grants to states to give poor children vouchers to attend a school of their family's choice (including a charter school, private school, or online school). Trump did not explain where the $20 billion in the federal budget would come from. Trump stated that "Distribution of this grant will favor states that have private school choice and charter laws."

==== Presidency ====
As president, Trump chose Republican financier Betsy DeVos, a prominent Michigan charter school advocate, as Secretary of Education. The nomination was highly controversial; The Washington Post education writer Valerie Strauss wrote that "DeVos was considered the most controversial education nominee in the history of the nearly 40-year-old Education Department." On the confirmation vote the Senate split 50/50 (along party lines, with two Republican senators joining all Democratic senators to vote against confirmation). Vice President Mike Pence used his tie-breaking vote to confirm the nomination, the first time in U.S. history that occurred.

==== 2024 campaign ====
During his 2024 presidential campaign, Trump expressed opposition to the use of academic tenure and diversity, equity, and inclusion programs in U.S. educational institutions.

=== Eminent domain ===
In 2015 Trump called eminent domain "wonderful". He repeatedly asked the government to invoke it on his behalf during past development projects.

=== Food safety ===
In September 2016, Trump posted a list on his website of regulations that he would eliminate. The list included what it called the "FDA Food Police" and mentioned the Food and Drug Administration's rules governing "farm and food production hygiene" and "food temperatures". The factsheet provided by Trump mirrored a May report by the conservative Heritage Foundation. It was replaced later that month and the new factsheet did not mention the FDA.

=== Native Americans ===
Colman McCarthy of The Washington Post wrote in 1993 that in testimony given that year to the House Natural Resources subcommittee on Native American Affairs, Trump "devoted much of his testimony to bad-mouthing Indians and their casinos," asserted that "organized crime is rampant on Indian reservations" and that "if it continues it will be the biggest scandal ever." Trump offered no evidence in support of his claim, and testimony from the FBI's organized crime division, the Justice Department's criminal division, and the IRS's criminal investigation division did not support Trump's assertion. Representative George Miller, a Democrat who was the chairman of the Natural Resources Committee at the time, stated: "In my 19 years in Congress, I've never heard more irresponsible testimony."

Trump bankrolled in 2000 a set of anti-Indian gaming ads in upstate New York that featured "a dark photograph showing hypodermic needles and drug paraphernalia," a warning that "violent criminals were coming to town," and an accusation that the St. Regis Mohawks had a "record of criminal activity." The ad—aimed at stopping the construction of a casino in the Catskills that might hurt Trump's own Atlantic City casinos—was viewed as "incendiary" and racially charged, and at the time local tribal leaders, in response, bought a newspaper ad of their own to denounce the "smear" and "racist and inflammatory rhetoric" of the earlier ad. The ads attracted the attention of the New York Temporary State Commission on Lobbying because they failed to disclose Trump's sponsorship as required by state lobbying rules. Trump acknowledged that he sponsored the ads and reached a settlement with the state in which he and his associates agreed to issue a public apology and pay $250,000 (the largest civil penalty ever levied by the commission) for evading state disclosure rules.

In 2015, Trump defended the controversial team name and mascot of the Washington Redskins, saying that the NFL team should not change its name and he did not find the term to be offensive. The "Change the Mascot" campaign, led by the Oneida Indian Nation and National Congress of American Indians, condemned Trump's stance.

=== Questioning Obama's citizenship ===
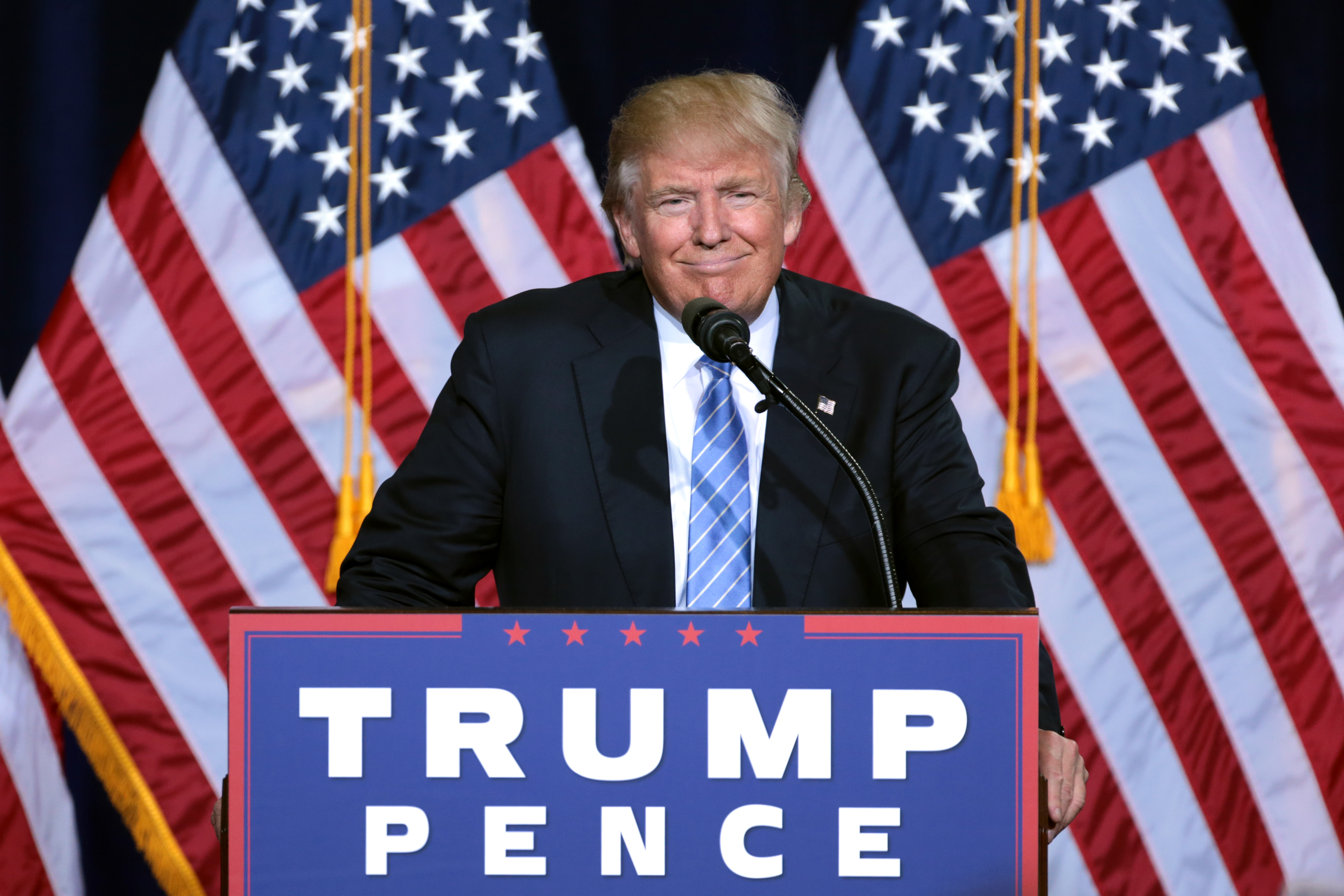
Trump speaking at a rally in Phoenix, Arizona, August 2016

For several years, Trump promoted false "birther" conspiracy theories about Barack Obama's citizenship.

In March 2011, during an interview on Good Morning America, Trump said he was seriously considering running for president, that he was a "little" skeptical of Obama's citizenship and that someone who shares this view should not be so quickly dismissed as an "idiot". Trump added: "Growing up no one knew him"—a claim ranked "Pants on Fire" by PolitiFact. Later, Trump appeared on The View repeating several times that "I want him (Obama) to show his birth certificate" and speculating that "there's something on that birth certificate that he doesn't like." Although officials in Hawaii certified Obama's citizenship, Trump said in April 2011 he would not let go of the issue, because he was not satisfied that Obama had proven his citizenship.

After Obama released his long-form birth certificate on April 27, 2011, Trump said: "I am really honored and I am really proud, that I was able to do something that nobody else could do." Trump continued to falsely question Obama's birth certificate in the following years, as late as 2015. In May 2012, Trump suggested that Obama might have been born in Kenya. In October 2012, Trump offered to donate five million dollars to the charity of Obama's choice in return for the publication of his college and passport applications before the end of the month. In a 2014 interview, Trump questioned whether Obama had produced his long-form birth certificate. When asked in December 2015 if he still questioned Obama's legitimacy, Trump said that "I don't talk about that anymore."

On September 14, 2016, Trump declined to acknowledge whether he believed Obama was born in the United States. On September 15, 2016, Trump for the first time acknowledged that Obama was born in the United States. He gave a terse statement, saying, "President Barack Obama was born in the United States, period." He falsely accused Hillary Clinton of having started the "Birther" movement. He also asserted that he "finished" the birther controversy, apparently referring to Obama's 2011 release of his long-form birth certificate, despite the fact that he continued to question Obama's citizenship in the years that followed. The next day, Trump tweeted a story in The Washington Post with the headline "Donald Trump's birther event is the greatest trick he's ever pulled". The "greatest trick" of the headline referred to the fact that cable networks aired the event live, waiting for a "birther" statement, while Trump touted his new hotel and supporters gave testimonials. In October 2016, Trump appeared to falsely question the legitimacy of Barack Obama's presidency, referring to him at a rally as the "quote 'president' ".

=== Social Security and Medicare ===
==== 2016 presidential campaign ====
During his campaign Trump repeatedly promised "I'm not going to cut Social Security like every other Republican and I'm not going to cut Medicare or Medicaid."

==== Presidency ====
For the first three years of his presidency he said nothing about cutting Social Security or Medicare. In a January 2020 interview he said he planned to "take a look" at entitlement programs like Medicare, but he then said via Twitter, "We will not be touching your Social Security or Medicare in Fiscal 2021 Budget." His proposed 2021 budget, unveiled in February 2020, included a $45 billion (~$52.7 billion in 2025) cut to the program within Social Security that supports disabled people, as well as cuts to Medicare and Medicaid. In August 2020, as part of a package of executive orders related to the COVID-19 pandemic, he signed an order to postpone the collection of the payroll taxes that support Social Security and Medicare, paid by employees and employers, for the rest of 2020. He also said that if he wins re-election, he will forgive the postponed payroll taxes and make permanent cuts to the payroll tax, saying he would "terminate the tax", although only Congress can change tax law. Analysts said such an action would threaten Social Security and Medicare by eliminating the dedicated funding which pays for the programs.

=== Veterans ===
==== 2016 presidential campaign ====
Trump caused a stir in July 2015 when he charged that Senator John McCain had "done nothing to help the vets," a statement ruled false by PolitiFact and the Chicago Tribune. Trump added that McCain is "not a war hero. He was a war hero because he was captured. I like people who weren't captured."

As a presidential candidate, Trump was critical of the ways in which veterans are treated in the United States, saying "the vets are horribly treated in this country...they are living in hell." He favored eliminating backlogs and wait-lists that had caused a Veterans Health Administration scandal the previous year. He claimed that "over 300,000 veterans have died waiting for care." He said he believed Veterans Affairs (VA) facilities needed to be technologically upgraded, to hire more veterans to treat other veterans, to increase support of female veterans, and to create satellite clinics within hospitals in rural areas. He proposed a plan for reforming the U.S. Department of Veterans Affairs with provisions to allow veterans to obtain care from any doctor or facility that accepts Medicare, to increase funding for PTSD and suicide prevention services, and to provide ob/gyn services at every VA hospital. Trump called for greater privatization of veterans' care, although his plan made no direct reference to letting veterans get health care outside the VA system. The Wall Street Journal noted that "such a plan is counter to recommendations from major veterans groups, the VA itself and from the Commission on Care, an independent body established by Congress that last week made recommendations for VA changes." Trump's plan calls "for legislation making it easier to fire underperforming employees, increasing mental-health resources and adding a White House hotline so veterans can bypass the VA and bring problems directly to the president." Trump opposed the current G.I. Bill in 2016.

In January 2016, Trump hosted a fundraising rally for veterans (skipping a televised Republican debate to do so). Weeks later, after The Wall Street Journal inquired with the Trump campaign when veterans' groups would receive their checks, the funds began to be disbursed. In April, the Journal reported that the funds had yet to be fully distributed. In May, NPR confirmed directly with 30 recipient charities that they had received their funds, "accounting for $4.27 million of the $5.6 million total," while the remaining 11 charities did not answer the question.

==== Presidency and 2020 campaign ====
In February 2018, the Trump administration initiated a policy known as 'Deploy Or Get Out' (DOGO), ordering the Pentagon to discharge any soldier who would be ineligible for deployment within the next 12 months. This mainly affected disabled soldiers. It also affected HIV-positive soldiers, who are allowed to serve within the US but cannot be deployed overseas; the DOGO policy meant that they could no longer serve within the US, either.

In August 2019, Trump falsely credited himself for passing the Veterans Choice Act, a law that had actually been passed under the previous president, Barack Obama, in 2014. Trump did sign an expansion of that Act in 2018.

In September 2020, The Atlantic reported that Trump referred to Americans who were casualties of war as "losers" and "suckers", citing multiple people who were present for the statements; later reporting by the Associated Press and Fox News corroborated some of these stories. Veterans expressed scorn over the report's allegations. Trump denied these allegations and called them "disgraceful", adding: "I would be willing to swear on anything that I never said that about our fallen heroes". John Bolton, who was present at the discussion, also said he never heard Trump make such comments.

A fact-check of the topic from The Washington Post analyzed various statements about the matter and found that, regardless of the nature of the exact quote, Trump has repeatedly expressed negative views about American military personnel who have been captured, wounded, or died in combat. "Trump was puzzled why people went into military service: 'What's in it for them? They don't make any money.' The official added: 'It was a character flaw of the President. He could not understand why someone would die for their country, not worth it.'"

==== 2024 presidential campaign ====
In August 2024, Trump was criticized for saying that the Presidential Medal of Freedom, which is awarded to civilians, is a "much better" award than the Medal of Honor, the top military honor, because those who are awarded the Medal of Honor "They're either in very bad shape because they've been hit so many times by bullets or they're dead," whereas the recipient of the Presidential Medal of Freedom is "healthy".

== Economy and trade ==
Some of the tax cuts in the Tax Cuts and Jobs Act, which Trump signed into law in 2017, were set by the law to expire in 2025. In April 2024, Trump stated at a fundraiser for wealthy donors that, if returned to office, he would seek to extend those provisions.

=== Trade ===
During his first presidency, Trump withdrew the United States from the Trans-Pacific Partnership, initiated a trade war with China, and negotiated the USMCA (United States Mexico Canada Agreement) as a successor to NAFTA (North American Free Trade Agreement).

After beginning his second term setting tariffs on specific items like imported cars, lumber, steel and aluminum, on April 2, 2025—a date he called "Liberation Day," Trump announced tariffs on every other nation on Earth, even on territories that are uninhabited. When the Supreme Court declared the Liberation Day tariffs to be unlawful because of an improper use of emergency powers, Trump pledged to institute a 15% global tariff by different means.

=== Cryptocurrencies ===
In 2019, Trump expressed skepticism about cryptocurrencies. In a post on Twitter, he said, "I am not a fan of Bitcoin and other Cryptocurrencies, which are not money, and whose value is highly volatile and based on thin air. Unregulated Crypto Assets can facilitate unlawful behavior, including drug trade and other illegal activity".

During the 2024 election campaign, Trump became the first presidential candidate to accept digital assets as donations. He has since, vowed to create a federal "Bitcoin stockpile" from Bitcoins seized by the US government from criminals over time, or by simply acquiring new Bitcoins.

== Environment and energy ==
By March 2016, Trump had not released any plans to combat climate change or provided details regarding his approach to energy issues more broadly.

In May 2016, Trump asked Republican U.S. representative Kevin Cramer of North Dakota—described by Reuters as "one of America's most ardent drilling advocates and climate change skeptics"—to draft Trump's energy policy.

=== California drought ===
In May 2016, Trump said that he could solve the water crisis in California. He declared that "there is no drought", a statement which the Associated Press noted is incorrect. Trump accused California state officials of denying farmers of water so they can send it out to sea "to protect a certain kind of three-inch fish." According to the AP, Trump appeared to be referring to a dispute between Central Valley farming interests and environmental interests; California farmers accuse water authorities of short-changing them of the water in their efforts to protect endangered native fish species.

=== Climate change and pollution ===
Trump rejects the scientific consensus on climate change, repeatedly contending that global warming is a "hoax". He has said that "the concept of global warming was created by and for the Chinese in order to make U.S. manufacturing non-competitive", a statement which Trump later said was a joke. It was also observed that he often conflates weather with climate change.

Trump criticized President Obama's description of climate change as "the greatest threat to future generations" for being "naive" and "one of the dumbest statements I've ever heard." A 2016 report by the Sierra Club contended that, were he to be elected president, Trump would be the only head of state in the world to contend that climate change is a hoax. In December 2009, Trump and his three adult children had signed a full-page advertisement from "business leaders" in The New York Times stating "If we fail to act now, it is scientifically irrefutable that there will be catastrophic and irreversible consequences for humanity and our planet" and encouraging "investment in the clean energy economy" to "create new energy jobs and increase our energy security".

Although "not a believer in climate change", Trump has stated that "clean air is a pressing problem" and has said: "There is still much that needs to be investigated in the field of climate change. Perhaps the best use of our limited financial resources should be in dealing with making sure that every person in the world has clean water."

The Trump administration repealed the Clean Water Rule protections afforded with the Clean Water Act, which were "established to limit the amount of pollution in U.S. bodies of water and to protect sources of drinking water for about one third of the country."

In May 2016, during his presidential campaign, Trump issued an energy plan focused on promoting fossil fuels and weakening environmental regulation. Trump promised to "rescind" in his first 100 days in office a variety of Environmental Protection Agency regulations established during the Obama administration to limit carbon emissions from coal-fired power plants, which contribute to a warming global climate. Trump has specifically pledged to revoke the Climate Action Plan and the Waters of the United States rule, which he characterizes as two "job-destroying Obama executive actions."

Trump has said "we're practically not allowed to use coal any more", a statement rated "mostly false" by PolitiFact. Trump has criticized the Obama administration's coal policies, describing the administration's moves to phase out the use of coal-fired power plants as "stupid". Trump has criticized the Obama administration for prohibiting "coal production on federal land" and states that it seeks to adopt "draconian climate rules that, unless stopped, would effectively bypass Congress to impose job-killing cap-and-trade." Trump has vowed to revive the U.S. coal economy, a pledge that is viewed by experts as unlikely to be fulfilled because the decline of the coal industry is driven by market forces, and specifically by the U.S. natural gas boom. An analysis by Scientific American found that Trump's promise to bring back closed coal mines would be difficult to fulfill, both because of environmental regulations and economic shifts. An analysis by Bloomberg New Energy Finance dismissed Trump's claims of a "war on coal": "U.S. coal's main problem has been cheap natural gas and renewable power, not a politically driven 'war on coal'...[coal] will continue being pushed out of the generating mix."

Trump wrote in his 2011 book that he opposed a cap-and-trade system to control carbon emissions.

According to FactCheck.org, over at least a five-year period, Trump has on several occasions made incorrect claims about the use of hair spray and its role in ozone depletion. At a rally in May 2016, "Trump implied that the regulations on hairspray and coal mining are both unwarranted" and incorrectly asserted that hairspray use in a "sealed" apartment prevents the spray's ozone-depleting substances from reaching the atmosphere.

In June 2019, the Trump White House tried to prevent a State Department intelligence analyst from testifying to Congress about "possibly catastrophic" effects of human-caused climate change, and prevented his written testimony containing science from NASA and NOAA from being included in the official Congressional Record because it was not consistent with administration positions.

In August 2019, Trump described America's coal production as "clean, beautiful", despite coal being a particularly polluting energy source. Although "clean coal" is a specific jargon used by the coal industry for certain technologies, Trump instead generally asserts that coal itself is "clean".

==== Opposition to international cooperation on climate change ====
President Trump during his 2017 announcement to leave the international Paris Agreement

Trump pledged in his May 2016 speech on energy policy to "cancel the Paris climate agreement" adopted at the 2015 United Nations Climate Change Conference (in which 170 countries committed to reductions in carbon emissions). Trump pledged to cancel the agreement in his first hundred days in office. This pledge followed earlier comments by Trump, in which he said that as president, he would "at a minimum" seek to renegotiate the agreement and "at a maximum I may do something else." Trump characterizes the Paris Agreement as "one-sided" and "bad for the United States", believing that the agreement is too favorable to China and other countries. In his May 2016 speech, Trump inaccurately said that the Paris Agreement "gives foreign bureaucrats control over how much energy we use on our land, in our country"; in fact, the Paris Agreement is based on voluntary government pledges, and no country controls the emissions-reduction plan of any other country.

Once the agreement is ratified by 55 nations representing 55 percent of global emissions (which has not yet occurred), a four-year waiting period goes into effect for any country wishing to withdraw from the agreement. A U.S. move to withdraw from the Paris Agreement as Trump proposed was viewed as likely to unravel the agreement; according to Reuters, such a move would spell "potential doom for an agreement many view as a last chance to turn the tide on global warming."

In Trump's May 2016 speech on energy policy, he declared that if elected president, he would "stop all payment of U.S. tax dollars to global warming programs." This would be a reversal of the U.S. pledge to commit funds to developing countries to assist in climate change mitigation and could undermine the willingness of other countries to take action against climate change.

In August 2016, 375 members of the U.S. National Academy of Sciences, including 30 Nobel laureates, issued an open letter warning that Trump's plan to unilaterally withdraw from the Paris Agreement would have dire effects on the fight against climate change. The scientists wrote, in part:

[I]t is of great concern that the Republican nominee for President has advocated U.S. withdrawal from the Paris Accord. A "Parexit" would send a clear signal to the rest of the world: "The United States does not care about the global problem of human-caused climate change. You are on your own." Such a decision would make it far more difficult to develop effective global strategies for mitigating and adapting to climate change. The consequences of opting out of the global community would be severe and long-lasting – for our planet's climate and for the international credibility of the United States.

=== Energy independence ===
In his May 2016 speech on energy policy, Trump stated: "Under my presidency, we will accomplish complete American energy independence. We will become totally independent of the need to import energy from the oil cartel or any nation hostile to our interest." The New York Times reported that "experts say that such remarks display a basic ignorance of the workings of the global oil markets."

=== Environmental regulation ===
In January 2016, Trump vowed "tremendous cutting" of the budget for the U.S. Environmental Protection Agency if elected. In an October 2015 interview with Chris Wallace, Trump explained, "what they do is a disgrace. Every week they come out with new regulations." When Wallace asked, "Who's going to protect the environment?", Trump answered "we'll be fine with the environment. We can leave a little bit, but you can't destroy businesses."

Trump has charged that the "U.S. Fish and Wildlife Service abuses the Endangered Species Act to restrict oil and gas exploration." In 2011, Trump said that would permit drilling in the Arctic National Wildlife Refuge in northeastern Alaska.

In July 2016, Trump suggested that he was in favor of state and local bans on hydraulic fracturing (fracking), saying, "I'm in favor of fracking, but I think that voters should have a big say in it. I mean, there's some areas, maybe, they don't want to have fracking. And I think if the voters are voting for it, that's up to them...if a municipality or a state wants to ban fracking, I can understand that."

=== Pipelines ===
==== Keystone XL ====
Trump promised to construct the Keystone XL pipeline, a proposed project to bring Canadian petroleum to the U.S. Trump pledged that if elected, he would ask TransCanada Corp. to renew its permit application for the project within his first hundred days in office. Trump claimed that Keystone XL pipeline will have "no impact on environment" and create "lots of jobs for U.S.", although in fact the pipeline is projected to create only 35 permanent jobs.

In his first days in office, Trump revived the Keystone XL project, signing a presidential memorandum reversing the rejection of the proposed pipeline that President Obama had made. Trump "also signed a directive ordering an end to protracted environmental reviews," pledging to make environmental review " a very short process".

==== Dakota Access Pipeline ====
After months of protest by thousands of protesters, including the largest gathering of Native Americans in 100 years, in December 2016 the United States Army Corps of Engineers under the Obama administration announced that it would not grant an easement for the pipeline, and the Corps of Engineers undertook an environmental impact statement to look at possible alternative routes. However, in February 2017, newly elected President Donald Trump ended the environmental impact assessment and ordered construction to continue. Trump has financial ties to Energy Transfer Partners and Phillips 66, who are both directly involved in the controversial project. The CEO of Energy Transfer Partners is a campaign donor for Donald Trump.

=== Renewable energy ===
In 2006, Trump expressed concerns about a wind farm planned to be built near where he planned to build a golf course. After the plans for the 11 wind turbines were approved by the Scottish government, Trump unsuccessfully sued in the Court of Sessions to have the plan declared illegal. Trump unsuccessfully appealed the case to the UK Supreme Court. Trump made 60 tweets about the offshore wind farm from 2012 to 2015.

In his 2015 book Crippled America, Trump is highly critical of the "big push" to develop renewable energy, arguing that the push is based on a mistaken belief that greenhouse gases contribute to climate change. It says, "There has been a big push to develop alternative forms of energy—so-called green energy—from renewable sources. That's a big mistake. To begin with, the whole push for renewable energy is being driven by the wrong motivation, the mistaken belief that global climate change is being caused by carbon emissions. If you don't buy that—and I don't—then what we have is really just an expensive way of making the tree-huggers feel good about themselves."

Trump uses the incorrect term for wind turbines, calling them windmills. Trump's position on wind turbines has been compared to Don Quixote due to the character tilting at windmills because he thought they were giants.

Trump has made several false claims about wind turbines. Trump finds wind turbines ugly. Trump has also expressed concerns about the large percentage of the world's wind turbines being built in China. Trump has criticized wind energy for being expensive and for not working without "massive subsidies". He added, "windmills are killing hundreds and hundreds of eagles. One of the most beautiful, one of the most treasured birds—and they're killing them by the hundreds and nothing happens," a claim rated as "mostly false" by PolitiFact since best estimates indicate that about one hundred golden eagles are killed each year by wind turbine blades.

In his 2016 platform, Trump claimed that he will reduce bureaucracy which would then lead to greater innovation. His platform mentions "renewable energies", including "nuclear, wind and solar energy" in that regard but adds that he would not support those "to the exclusion of other energy".

Trump supports a higher ethanol mandate (the amount of ethanol required by federal regulation to be blended into the U.S. gasoline supply). Trump vowed to protect the government's Renewable Fuel Standard and corn-based ethanol.

=== Wildlife conservation and animal welfare ===
In October 2016, the Humane Society of the United States denounced Trump's campaign, saying that a "Trump presidency would be a threat to animals everywhere" and that he has "a team of advisors and financial supporters tied in with trophy hunting, puppy mills, factory farming, horse slaughter, and other abusive industries."

In February 2017, under the Trump administration, the U.S. Department of Agriculture (USDA) unexpectedly removed from its public website "all enforcement records related to horse soring and to animal welfare at dog breeding operations and other facilities." The decision prompted criticism from animal welfare advocates (such as the Animal Welfare Institute), investigative journalists, and some of the regulated industries (the Association of Zoos and Aquariums and the group Speaking of Research said that the move created an impression of non-transparency).

== Health care ==
In 1999, during his abortive 2000 Reform Party presidential campaign, Trump told TV interviewer Larry King, "I believe in universal health care." In his 2000 book, The America We Deserve, Trump reiterated his call for universal health care and focused on a Canadian-style single-payer health care system as a means to achieve it.

=== 2016 campaign ===
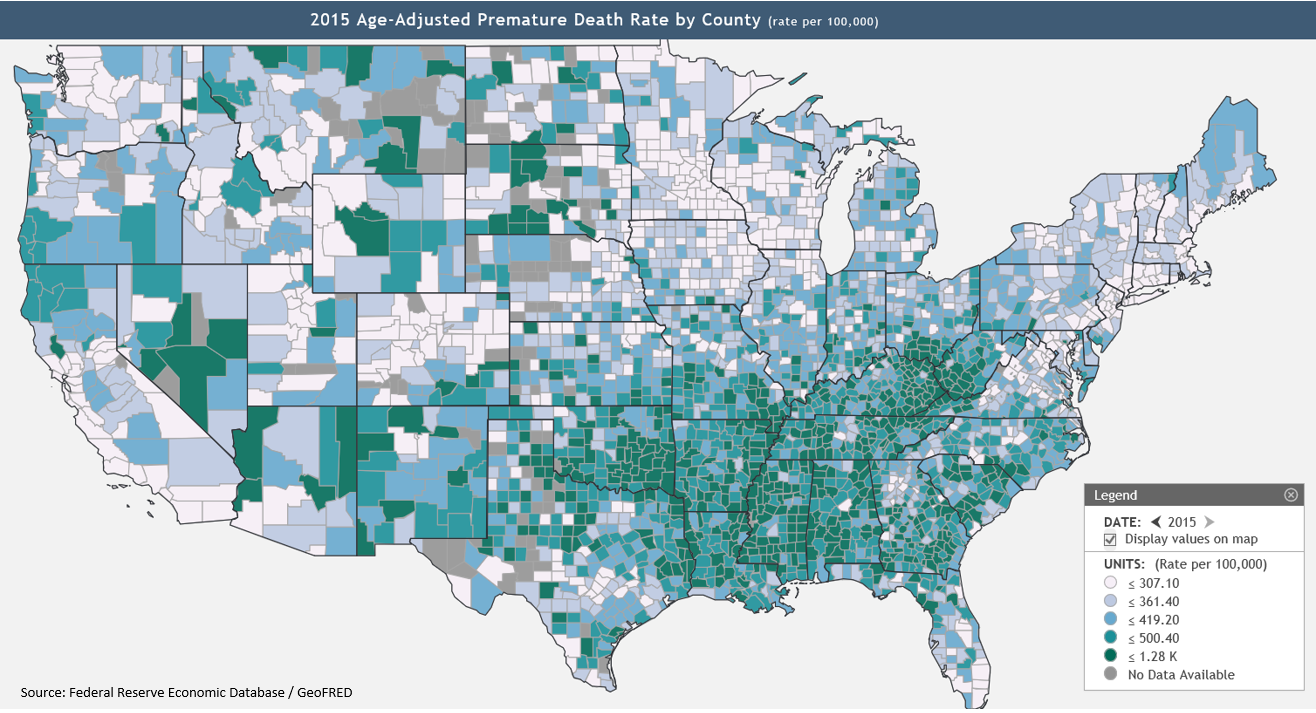
The map illustrates the frequency of premature deaths (those under age 75) adjusted for the age of persons in the county. Nobel laureate economist Angus Deaton stated in January 2017 that: "If you take county by county in the US, and you look at what we call deaths of despair – suicides, opioids and liver disease – that it correlates by .4 with votes for Trump. That's a big correlation...a very strong relationship."

According to a report by the RAND Corporation, Trump's proposed health-care policy proposals, depending on specific elements implemented, would result in between 15 and 25 million fewer people with health insurance and increase the federal deficit in a range from zero to $41 billion (~$51.7 billion in 2025) in 2018. This was in contrast to Clinton's proposals, which would expand health insurance coverage for between zero and 10 million people while increasing the deficit in a range from zero to $90 billion (~$113 billion in 2025) in 2018. According to the report, low-income individuals and sicker people would be most adversely affected by his proposed policies, although it was pointed out that not all policy proposals have been modeled.

=== Actions while in office (2017–2021) ===
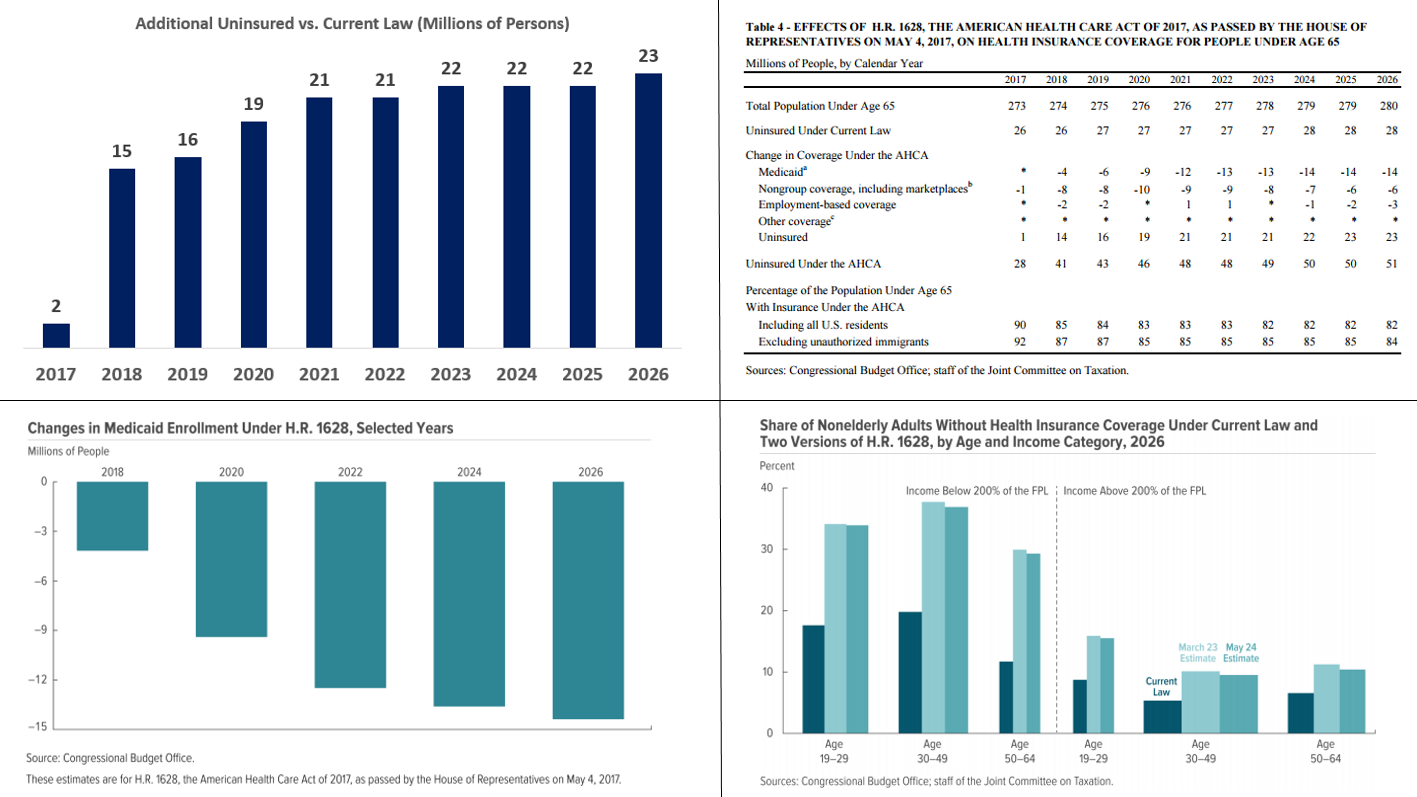
CBO estimated in May 2017 that under the Republican American Healthcare Act or AHCA, about 23 million fewer people would have health insurance in 2026, compared with current law.

==== Legislation ====
President Trump advocated repealing and replacing the Affordable Care Act (ACA or "Obamacare"). Trump celebrated the Republican-controlled House passing the American Health Care Act (AHCA) in May 2017. The Senate decided to write its own version of the bill rather than voting on the AHCA. One Senate bill, called the "Better Care Reconciliation Act of 2017" (BCRA), failed on a vote of 45–55 in the Senate during July 2017. One variation fell one vote short amid opposition from all Democrats as well as John McCain, Lisa Murkowski and Susan Collins. In all, the Senate rejected five bills to repeal and/or replace Obamacare. The Congressional Budget Office estimated that the bills would increase the number of uninsured by over 20 million persons, while reducing the budget deficit marginally.

==== Actions to hinder the implementation of ACA ====
President Trump continued Republican attacks on the ACA while in office, including steps such as:

- Weakening the individual mandate through his first executive order, which resulted in limiting enforcement of mandate penalties by the IRS. For example, tax returns without indications of health insurance ("silent returns") will still be processed, overriding instructions from the Obama administration to the IRS to reject them.
- Reducing funding for advertising for the 2017 and 2018 exchange enrollment periods by up to 90%, with other reductions to support resources used to answer questions and help people sign-up for coverage. Some attributed the reduction in ACA enrollment in 2018 to these cuts.
- Cutting the enrollment period for 2018 by half, to 45 days. The NYT editorial board referred to this as part of a concerted "sabotage" effort.
- Issuing public statements that the exchanges are unstable or in a death spiral. CBO reported in May 2017 that the exchanges would remain stable under current law (ACA), but would be less stable if the AHCA were passed.
- Advocating in 2020 for a lawsuit that would have wiped out the ACA entirely (the Supreme Court upheld the law in 2021)

Several insurers and actuary groups cited uncertainty created by President Trump, specifically non-enforcement of the individual mandate and not funding cost sharing reduction subsidies, as contributing 20-30 percentage points to premium increases for the 2018 plan year on the ACA exchanges. In other words, absent Trump's actions against the ACA, premium increases would have averaged 10% or less, rather than the estimated 28-40% under the uncertainty his actions created.

CNN in 2020 described Trump's administration as opting to undermine the Affordable Care Act from within after failing to overturn the law in Congress. The outlet described in particular approving requests by Georgia that consumer advocates say weakened the law and would reduce coverage and raise premiums. His administration had also repeatedly attempted to water down or repeal the ACA's protections for people with preexisting medical conditions, without any proposal on how to restore these protections if the ACA was rendered void.

In February 2021, the Center on Budget and Policy Priorities (CBPP) published a timeline of "sabotage" efforts to undermine the Affordable Care Act throughout the Trump Administration.

==== Ending cost-sharing reduction (CSR) payments ====
President Trump announced in October 2017 he would end the smaller of the two types of subsidies under the ACA, the cost sharing reduction (CSR) subsidies. This controversial decision significantly raised premiums on the ACA exchanges (as much as 20 percentage points) along with the premium tax credit subsidies that rise with them, with the CBO estimating a $200 billion increase in the budget deficit over a decade. CBO also estimated that initially up to one million fewer would have health insurance coverage, although more might have it in the long run as the subsidies expand. CBO expected the exchanges to remain stable (e.g., no "death spiral") as the premiums would increase and prices would stabilize at the higher (non-CSR) level.

President Trump's argument that the CSR payments were a "bailout" for insurance companies and therefore should be stopped, actually results in the government paying more to insurance companies ($200B over a decade) due to increases in the premium tax credit subsidies. Journalist Sarah Kliff described Trump's argument as "completely incoherent."

==== Affordable Care Act and health-care reform ====
As the 2016 campaign unfolded, Trump stated that he favors repealing the Affordable Care Act (ACA or "Obamacare")—which Trump refers to as a "complete disaster"—and replacing it with a "free-market system". On his campaign website, Trump said, "on day one of the Trump Administration, we will ask Congress to immediately deliver a full repeal of Obamacare." Trump's campaign has insisted that the candidate has "never supported socialized medicine."

Trump has cited the rising costs of premiums and deductibles as a motivation to repeal the Affordable Care Act. However, an estimated 70% of persons on the exchanges could still purchase a plan for $75/month thanks to subsidies. Further, in the employer market, health insurance premium cost increases from 2015 to 2016 were an estimated 3% on average, low by historical standards. While deductibles rose 12% on average from 2015 to 2016, more workers are pairing higher-deductible plans with tax-preferred health savings accounts (HSAs), offsetting some of the deductible increase (i.e., lowering their effective deductible).

The Congressional Budget Office reported in March 2016 that there were approximately 23 million people with insurance due to the law, with 12 million people covered by the exchanges (10 million of whom received subsidies to help pay for insurance) and 11 million made eligible for Medicaid. The CBO also reported in June 2015 that: "Including the budgetary effects of macroeconomic feedback, repealing the ACA would increase federal budget deficits by $137 billion over the 2016–2025 period." CBO also estimated that excluding the effects of macroeconomic feedback, repeal of the ACA would increase the deficit by $353 billion over that same period.

In the early part of his campaign, Trump responded to questions about his plan to replace the ACA by saying that it would be "something terrific!" Trump subsequently said at various points that he believes that the government should have limited involvement in health care, but has also said that "at the lower end, where people have no money, I want to try and help those people," by "work[ing] out some sort of a really smart deal with hospitals across the country." and has said "everybody's got to be covered." At a February 2016 town hall on CNN, Trump said that he supported the individual health insurance mandate of the ACA, which requires all Americans to have health insurance, saying "I like the mandate. So here's where I'm a little bit different [from other Republican candidates]." In March 2016, Trump reversed himself, saying that "Our elected representatives must eliminate the individual mandate. No person should be required to buy insurance unless he or she wants to."

In March 2016, Trump released his health care plan, which called for allowing health insurance companies to compete across state lines and for making Medicaid into a block grant system for the states. He also called for elimination of the individual mandate for health insurance, for allowing health insurance premiums to be deducted on tax returns, and for international competition in the drug market. In the same document, Trump acknowledged that mental health care in the U.S. is often inadequate but offered no immediate solution to the problem, instead stating that "there are promising reforms being developed in Congress."

Explaining how he would address the problem of ensuring the people that would lose their insurance coverage if Obamacare were repealed, Trump said, "We have to come up, and we can come up with many different plans. In fact, plans you don't even know about will be devised because we're going to come up with plans—health care plans—that will be so good. And so much less expensive both for the country and for the people. And so much better." His plan has been criticized by Republican health experts as "a jumbled hodgepodge of old Republican ideas, randomly selected, that don't fit together" (Robert Laszewski) providing nothing that "would do anything more than cover a couple million people" (Gail R. Wilensky).

He characterized the Canadian healthcare system as "catastrophic in certain ways" in October 2016 during the second presidential debate. In 2015, Trump also expressed admiration for the Scottish health-care system, which is single payer, but argued it would work well in the US.

=== 2024 campaign ===
In November 2023, Trump continued to advocate for repealing and replacing Obamacare.

During a March 11, 2024 interview, Trump suggested he was open to cutting entitlement programs such as Social Security and Medicare, which the Trump campaign later claimed was merely referring to "cutting waste" and that he would protect the programs. Trump previously suggested while president in 2020 that he would "at some point" look into cutting entitlement programs, and Trump's previous budget proposals have suggested some cuts to the programs. During the Republican primary, Trump attacked his opponents by suggesting they would cut entitlement benefits.

Trump admitted in the debate that he did not have a Health Care plan, saying only that he had "concepts of a plan."

=== Public health ===
==== Ebola ====
In 2014, after a New York physician returned from treating Ebola patients in West Africa and showed symptoms of the disease, Trump tweeted that if the doctor had Ebola, "Obama should apologize to the American people & resign!" When the doctor was later confirmed to have developed Ebola in New York, Trump tweeted that it was "Obama's fault" and "I have been saying for weeks for President Obama to stop the flights from West Africa. So simple, but he refused. A TOTAL incompetent!" Trump also criticized President Obama's decision to send 3,000 U.S. troops to affected regions to help combat the outbreak (see Operation United Assistance).

As doctor Kent Brantly returned to the U.S. for treatment, Trump tweeted that U.S. doctors who went abroad to treat Ebola were "great" but "must suffer the consequences" if they became infected and insisted that "the U.S. must immediately stop all flights from EBOLA infected countries or the plague will start and spread inside our 'borders.'" When an Ebola patient was scheduled to come to the U.S. for treatment, Trump tweeted, "now I know for sure that our leaders are incompetent. KEEP THEM OUT OF HERE!"

Trump's suggestion on the Ebola crisis "would go against all the expert advice being offered". Doctors warned "that isolating West Africa would only make the Ebola outbreak much worse" by "potentially denying help and supplies from getting in", and might destabilize the countries and contribute to the disease's spread outside West Africa.

==== Zika ====
On August 3, 2016, Trump called the Zika virus outbreak in Florida "a big problem". He expressed his support for Florida governor Rick Scott's handling of the crisis, saying that he's "doing a fantastic job". When asked if Congress should convene an emergency session to approve Zika funding, Trump answered, "I would say that it's up to Rick Scott." On August 11, 2016, Trump said that he was in favor of Congress setting aside money to combat the Zika virus.

==== Vaccines ====
Trump suggested that childhood vaccinations were related to autism, a hypothesis which has been repeatedly debunked. The American Academy of Pediatrics and Autism Speaks have "decried Trump's remarks as false and potentially dangerous."

In 2010, the Donald J. Trump Foundation donated $10,000 to Generation Rescue, Jenny McCarthy's nonprofit organization that advocates the incorrect view that autism and related disorders are primarily caused by vaccines.

Despite his prior views, however, Trump did drop his false claims of vaccines being related to autism in 2019 after the 2019 measles outbreaks, in saying: "They have to get those shots," as well as "...vaccinations are so important".

== Immigration ==
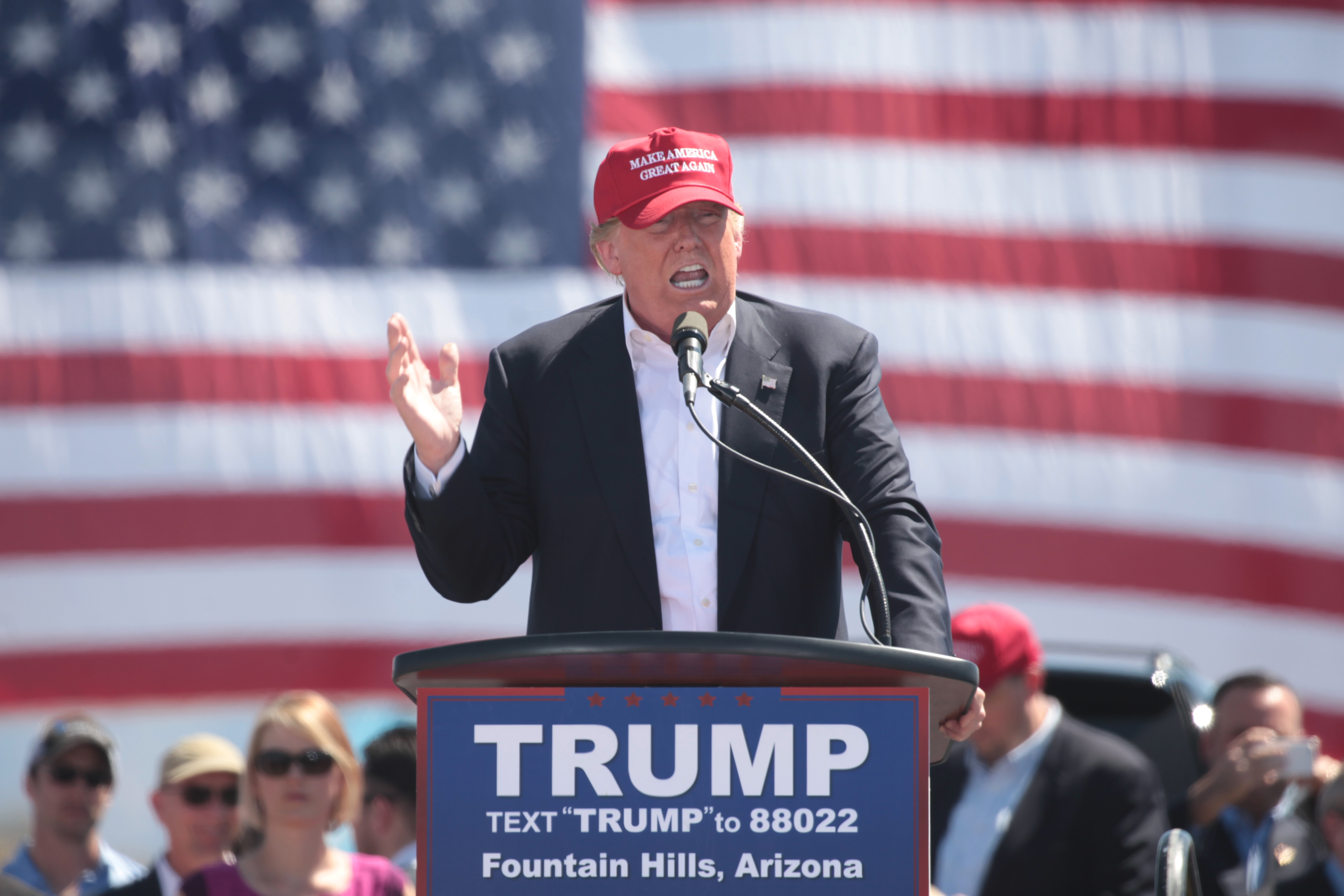
Donald Trump speaking at a rally in Fountain Hills, Arizona, on March 19, 2016

Illegal immigration was a signature issue of Trump's presidential campaign, and he proposed reforms and made controversial remarks regarding immigrants.

In August 2019, Trump accused Democrats of supporting "open borders" by attempting to use their opposition to his immigration priorities as an example despite no explicit evidence to support his claim. He also claimed that his administration is "building the wall faster and better than ever", but no new barriers were erected by June 2019 at the Mexico–United States border unlike what Trump promised during his 2016 campaign. The only installations have been replacement fencing of old barriers. Trump also falsely claimed that only 2% of migrants who were released instead of detained eventually returned for their immigration hearings. The 2017 statistic is 72% for migrants, and 89% of migrants applying for asylum.

Trump addresses congress in 2025, "I have sent Congress a detailed funding request laying out exactly how we will (...) complete the largest deportation operation in American history, larger even then current record holder, President Dwight D. Eisenhower"

Since at least the November 2015 debates, Trump has expressed support for deportation under President Eisenhower while not saying Operation Wetback.

Avatar of Donald J. Trump

Donald J. Trump
(@realDonaldTrump)
tweeted:

English:

This July 4th weekend I want to give a big “THANK YOU!” to the Heroic ICE Officers fighting every day to reclaim our Sovereignty and Freedom. One of the most exciting parts of the “ONE BIG BEAUTIFUL BILL ACT” is that it includes ALL of the Funding and Resources that ICE needs to carry out the Largest Mass Deportation Operation in History. Our Brave ICE Officers, who are under daily violent assault, will finally have the tools and support that they need. We will not let America become a Third World Country filled with Crime, failing Schools, collapsing Hospitals, and total Social Dysfunction. It’s called “Remigration” and, it will, MAKE AMERICA GREAT AGAIN!

July 5, 2025

== Law and order ==
=== Capital punishment ===
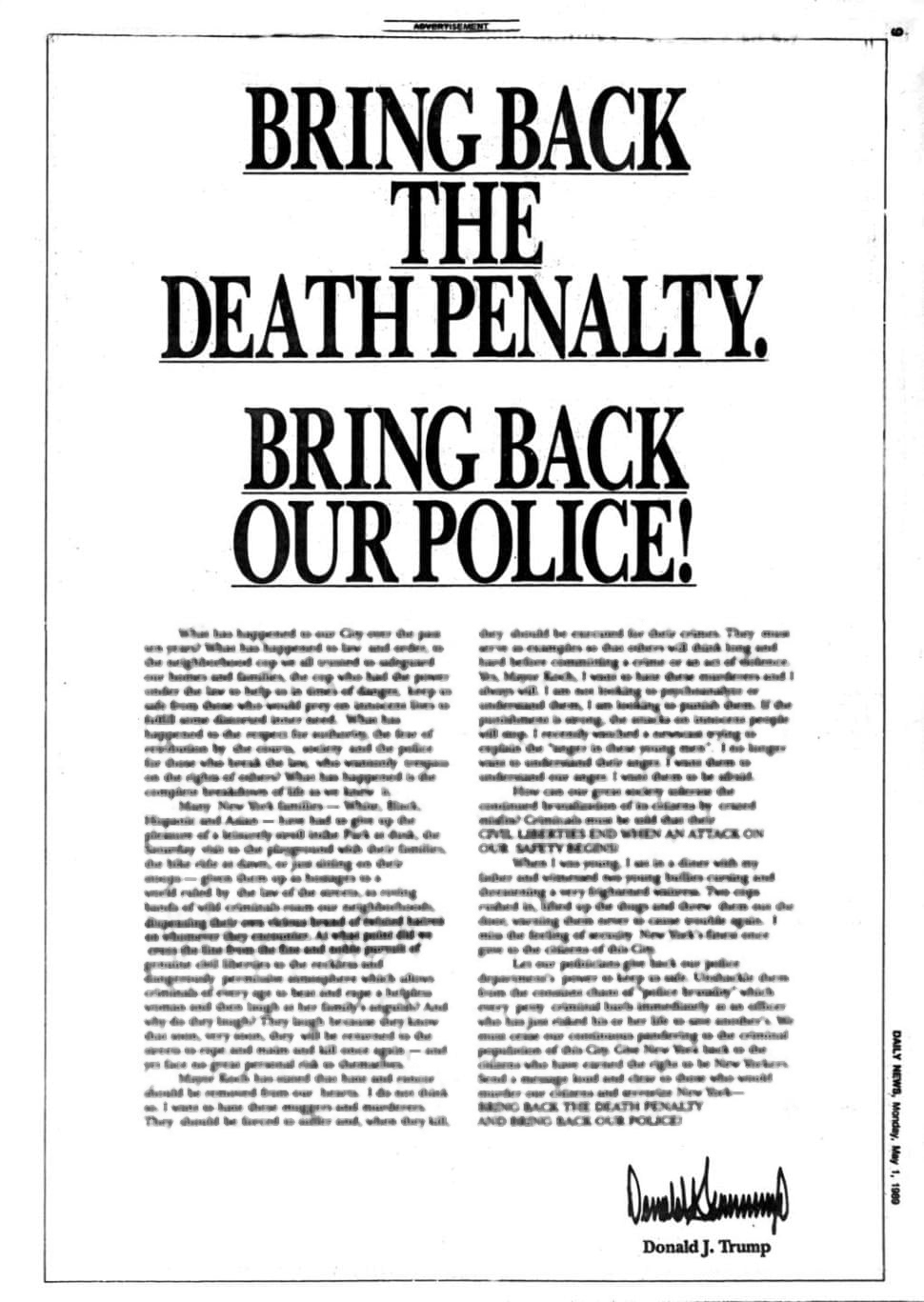
"The full-page advertisement was taken out by Trump in the May 1, 1989, issue of the Daily News." Donald Trump spent $85,000 in submitting the ad across four New York City newspapers.

Trump has long advocated for capital punishment in the United States. In May 1989, shortly after the Central Park jogger case received widespread media attention, Trump purchased a full-page ad in four New York City newspapers with the title "BRING BACK THE DEATH PENALTY!" Five defendants (the "Central Park Five") were wrongfully convicted in the case and were subsequently exonerated. By October 2016, Trump still maintained that the Central Park Five were guilty.

In December 2015, in a speech accepting the endorsement of the New England Police Benevolent Association, Trump said that "One of the first things I do [if elected President] in terms of executive order if I win will be to sign a strong, strong statement that will go out to the country, out to the world, that...anybody killing a police officer—death penalty. It's going to happen, O.K.?" However, the president has no authority over these prosecutions as they usually take place in state court under state law, and over one-third of U.S. states have already abolished the death penalty. Furthermore, mandatory death sentences are unconstitutional, as held by the Supreme Court in Woodson v. North Carolina (1976).

In the six months between July 2020 and the end of Trump's term, the federal government executed thirteen people; the first executions since 2002. In this time period, Trump oversaw more federal executions than any president in the preceding 120 years.

=== Torture ===
Trump has said that he believes that "torture absolutely works". During his campaign, Trump said that "I would bring back waterboarding, and I'd bring back a hell of a lot worse than waterboarding".

=== Criminal justice ===
As of May 2016, Trump's campaign website made no mention of criminal justice reform, and Trump rarely talked in specifics. Trump has stated that he would be "tough on crime" and criticized Barack Obama's and Hillary Clinton's criminal justice reform proposals. When asked about specific criminal justice reforms, Trump reportedly often changes the subject back to supporting police or vague answers about needing to be "tough." In January 2016, Trump said that along with veterans, "the most mistreated people in this country are police."

Trump supports the use of "stop and frisk" tactics, of the kind once used in New York City. In 2000, Trump also rejected as elitist and naive the arguments of criminal justice reformers that the U.S. criminal justice system puts too many criminals in jail. Trump is in favor of at least one mandatory sentence, where using a gun to commit a crime results in a five-year sentence.

Trump on several occasions asserted that crime was rising in the United States. Trump's assertions that crime was rising were false; in fact, both violent and property crimes consistently declined in the U.S. from the early 1990s until 2014. Trump's false claim that "inner-city crime is reaching record levels" received a "pants-on-fire" rating from PolitiFact. As president, Trump reiterated in February 2017 the false claim that crime was rising, saying, "the murder rate in our country is the highest it's been in 47 years."

In May 2016, Trump stated that the cities of Oakland and Ferguson are "among the most dangerous in the world". In response, CBS News in San Francisco reported that the murder rates in Oakland and Baghdad are comparable, but PolitiFact rated Trump's claim false given that "homicide rates alone are not enough to gauge whether a city is dangerous or not".

On November 22, 2015, Trump retweeted a graphic with purported statistics—cited to a nonexistent "Crime Statistics Bureau"—which falsely claimed that African Americans were responsible for 81% of the homicides of White Americans and that police were responsible for 1% of black homicides compared to 4% of white homicides. Trump's retweet earned PolitiFact's "Pants on Fire" rating and was called "grossly inaccurate" by FactCheck.org the next day. Blacks were actually responsible for only 15% of white homicides according to FBI data for 2014. The breakdown of the racial differences in police killings in Trump's retweet was also inaccurate. Based on the percentages, the number of whites killed by police would be almost 4 times greater than the number of blacks. Data from The Washington Post for 2009 to 2013 showed a ratio of 1.5 white deaths by police for each black death. A separate estimate by Peter Moskos, associate professor at the John Jay College of Criminal Justice attributed 10% of white homicides to police and 4% to police for blacks. When asked about the statistics, Trump falsely maintained that the statistics came "from sources that are very credible."

=== Drug policy ===
Trump's views on drug policy have shifted dramatically over time.

At a luncheon hosted by the Miami Herald in April 1990, Trump told a crowd of 700 people that U.S. drug enforcement policy was "a joke," and that: "We're losing badly the war on drugs. You have to legalize drugs to win that war. You have to take the profit away from these drug czars."

In his campaign for the presidency in 2015 and 2016, however, Trump adopted "drug warrior" positions and has sought advice on the issue from William J. Bennett, who served as the U.S. first "drug czar" in the 1980s "and has remained a proponent of harsh 1980s-style drug war tactics." Trump told Sean Hannity in June 2015 that he opposes marijuana legalization and that "I feel strongly about that." Trump also claims to have personally never used controlled substances of any kind.

Trump has voiced support for medical marijuana, saying that he is "a hundred percent in favor" because "I know people that have serious problems...and...it really, really does help them." When asked about Colorado (where recreational use of marijuana is legal), Trump softened his previously expressed views and essentially said that states should be able to decide on whether marijuana for recreational purposes should be legal.

The administration organized the Marijuana Policy Coordination Committee in 2018.

In 2024, Trump endorsed decriminalization of marijuana in Florida. On full legalization of marijuana, he suggested it would be inevitable in the state regardless of his personal stance on the issue, and instead advocated regulations restricting its use in public spaces.

On Jan. 21, 2025, a day into his second term, Trump pardoned Ross Ulbricht, the founder of the Silk Road dark Web marketplace for illegal drugs, including opioids, such as fentanyl, incapacitating agents and other narcotics. During a Dec. 2023 meeting at Mar-a-Lago, Angela McArdle, chairwoman of the Libertarian Party, told Trump that "he needed to free Ulbricht if he wanted Libertarian support" for his 2024 campaign.

=== Gun regulation ===
In his 2000 book The America We Deserve, Trump wrote that he generally opposed gun control, but supported the Federal Assault Weapons Ban and supported a "slightly longer waiting period to purchase a gun." In his book, Trump also criticized the gun lobby, saying: "The Republicans walk the N.R.A. line and refuse even limited restrictions." In 2008, Trump opposed hunting-education classes in schools and called the "thought of voluntarily putting guns in the classroom...a really bad plan."

==== 2016 campaign ====
While campaigning for the presidency Trump reversed some of his positions on gun issues, calling for the expansion of gun rights. In 2015 he described himself as a staunch advocate of the Second Amendment and said concealed carry "is a right, not a privilege." He proposed eliminating prohibitions on assault weapons, military-style weapons and high-capacity magazines (which Trump described as "scary sounding phrases" used by gun control advocates "to confuse people"), as well as making concealed carry permits valid nationwide, rather than on the current state-to-state basis. At his campaign website he called for an overhaul of the current federal background check system, arguing that "Too many states are failing to put criminal and mental health records into the system."

On the campaign trail in 2015, Trump praised the National Rifle Association of America (NRA), and received the group's endorsement after becoming the presumptive Republican nominee. He asserted that the presence of more guns in schools and public places could have stopped mass shootings such as those in 2015 in Paris; in San Bernardino, California; and at Umpqua Community College. Trump supported barring people on the government's terrorist watch list from purchasing weapons, saying in 2015: "If somebody is on a watch list and an enemy of state and we know it's an enemy of state, I would keep them away, absolutely." On this position, Trump departed from the position of gun-rights groups and most of his 2016 Republican rivals for the presidency and supported a stance backed by Senate Democrats. Trump said that he holds a New York concealed carry permit and that "I carry on occasion, sometimes a lot. I like to be unpredictable." A 1987 Associated Press story said that he held a handgun permit at that time.

In January 2016, Trump said: "I will get rid of gun-free zones on schools, and—you have to—and on military bases...My first day, it gets signed, okay? My first day. There's no more gun-free zones." Trump could not eliminate gun-free school zones by executive order, however, since such zones were created by a federal law that can only be reversed by Congress. In May 2016, Trump made ambiguous comments on guns in classrooms, saying: "I don't want to have guns in classrooms. Although, in some cases, teachers should have guns in classrooms." In May 2016, Trump accused Hillary Clinton of lying when she claimed that "Donald Trump would force schools to allow guns in classrooms on his first day in office." According to The Washington Post fact-checker, Clinton's statement was accurate.

In June 2016, Trump said "it would have been a beautiful, beautiful sight" to see Omar Mateen shot in the head by an armed patron in the Orlando nightclub shooting, reiterating his stance that more people should be armed in public places. A few days later, after two top officials of the NRA challenged the notion that drinking clubgoers should be armed, Trump reversed his position, saying that he "obviously" meant that additional guards or employees should have been armed in the nightclub. Security personnel and other staffers at a number of Trump's hotels and golf courses told ABC News that patrons are not permitted to carry guns on the property. A Trump spokesman denied this, saying that licensed persons are permitted to carry guns on the premises.

At a rally on August 9, 2016, Trump accused his opponent of wanting to "essentially abolish the Second Amendment", and went on: "By the way, and if she gets to pick her judges, nothing you can do, folks. Although the Second Amendment people, maybe there is, I don't know." These comments were interpreted by critics as suggesting violence against Clinton or her appointees, but Trump's campaign stated that he was referring to gun rights advocates' "great political power" as a voting bloc.

==== First presidency (2017–2021) ====
One month after his inauguration, Trump reversed an Obama-era regulation that had been intended to prevent weapons purchases by certain people with mental health problems. Had the regulation been allowed to take effect, it would have added 75,000 names, including the names of those who receive federal financial assistance due to a mental illness or who have financial proxies due to a mental illness, to a background check database.

Following the Stoneman Douglas High School shooting in February 2018, Trump met with students and others at the White House for a "listening session". Trump suggested arming up to 20% of the teachers to stop "maniacs" from attacking students. The following day Trump called a "gun free" school a "magnet" for criminals and tweeted, "Highly trained, gun adept, teachers/coaches would solve the problem instantly, before police arrive. GREAT DETERRENT!"

In August 2019, following mass shootings in El Paso, Texas, and in Dayton, Ohio, Trump declined to support universal background checks, saying that existing background checks are already "very, very strong," even though "we have sort of missing areas and areas that don't complete the whole circle." He also indicated that he was not interested in working on bipartisan compromises.

In a speech at a 2023 NRA convention, Trump expressed support for national concealed carry reciprocity which would allow a person with a concealed carry permit in one state to have their permit apply across state lines nationwide.

=== Judiciary ===
According to The New York Times, many of Trump's statements on legal topics are "extemporaneous and resist conventional legal analysis," with some appearing "to betray ignorance of fundamental legal concepts."

==== Supreme Court ====
Trump stated he wanted to replace U.S. Supreme Court justice Antonin Scalia, who had died, with "a person of similar views and principles". He released a list of eleven potential picks to replace Scalia. The jurists were widely considered to be conservative. All are white, and eight of the eleven are men. Trump had previously insisted that he would seek guidance from conservative groups such as the Federalist Society and the Heritage Foundation when it came to picking Supreme Court candidates. Several of the judges listed by Trump had questioned abortion rights. Six of the eleven judges had clerked for conservative Supreme Court justices.

Trump has claimed that he "would probably appoint" justices to the Supreme Court who "would look very seriously" at the Hillary Clinton email controversy "because it's a criminal activity." However, under the U.S. Constitution, Supreme Court justices "are neither investigators nor prosecutors."

Trump criticized Chief Justice of the United States John Roberts, a George W. Bush appointee, as a "nightmare for conservatives," citing Roberts' vote in the 2015 decision in King v. Burwell, which upheld provisions of the Affordable Care Act. He also blamed Roberts for the June 2015 Supreme Court ruling legalizing same-sex marriage, apparently in error, since in that case Roberts actually dissented from the majority opinion.

In February 2016, Trump called on the Senate to stop Obama from filling the vacant seat on the Supreme Court.

An analysis by FiveThirtyEight predicted that, under the assumption that Scalia's vacant seat on the Court would not be filled before Trump's presidency, and taking account of the advanced age of three of the sitting justices, that a Trump presidency would move the Supreme Court "rightward toward its most conservative position in recent memory".

Trump ultimately appointed three justices to the court: Neil Gorsuch to replace Scalia, Brett Kavanaugh to replace Anthony Kennedy, and Amy Coney Barrett to replace Ruth Bader Ginsburg. The appointments of Trump's nominees shifted the court to a strongly conservative position. In the period after Trump left office, the court issued several conservative rulings, including declaring that the constitution does not protect abortion, in which Trump's appointees contributed to the majority.

==== Comments on judges and judicial decisions ====
Since taking office, Trump has made a series of "escalating attacks on the federal judiciary" in response to judicial decisions against him. After a federal district judge, James Robart, issued a stay of Trump's executive order on travel, immigration, and refugees, Trump disparaged him on Twitter, referring to him as a "the so-called judge" and writing: "[He] put our country in such peril. If something happens blame him and court system. People pouring in. Bad!"

While presidents in the past have sometimes offered muted criticism of judicial opinions, Trump's personal attacks on individual judges are seen as unprecedented in American history. Trump's remarks prompted criticism from his own nominee, Gorsuch, who told Senator Richard Blumenthal that Trump's statements were "disheartening" and "demoralizing" to the federal judiciary. A number of legal scholars feared that Trump's conduct could undermine public confidence in the courts and endanger the independence of the judiciary.

=== Term limits and ethics regulations ===
In October 2016, Trump said that he would push for a constitutional amendment to impose term limits on members of Congress, so that members of the House of Representatives could serve for a maximum of six years and senators for a maximum of twelve years. Trump also pledged to re-institute a ban on executive branch officials from lobbying for five years after leaving government service and said that he supported Congress instituting a similar five-year lobbying ban of its own, applicable to former members and staff. Under current "cooling-off period" regulations, former U.S. representatives are required to wait one year before they can lobby Congress, former U.S. senators are required to two years, and former executive-branch officials "must wait either two years or one year before lobbying their former agency, depending on how senior they were."

==== Twenty-second Amendment ====
On multiple occasions since taking office in 2017, Trump has questioned presidential term limits and in public remarks has talked about serving beyond the limits of the Twenty-second Amendment. For instance, during an April 2019 White House event for the Wounded Warrior Project, he joked that he would remain president "at least for 10 or 14 years".

=== First Amendment ===
==== Flag desecration ====
During a rally in June 2020, President Trump told supporters that he thinks flag burning should be punishable by one year in prison.

==== Libel ====
During his 2016 presidential campaign, Trump proposed that the United States should "open up" its libel laws to make it easier to sue newspapers that write "purposely negative and horrible and false articles".

=== Official language ===
In 2015 during a debate, Trump said, "This is a country where we speak English, not Spanish."

In June 2019, Senator Steve Daines proposed reviving the previously unsuccessful language amendment, and in doing so received the support of the Trump administration.

On March 1, 2025, Trump signed an executive order designating English as the country's official language.

=== Video game violence ===
Trump has voiced his opposition to video game violence. After it was erroneously reported that the Sandy Hook shooter frequently played violent video games, Trump tweeted, "Video game violence & glorification must be stopped—it is creating monsters!"

Following the Stoneman Douglas shooting event, President Trump arranged to meet with several video game industry professionals on March 8, 2018; in attendance beyond Trump and other Congressmen included Mike Gallagher, the president and CEO of the ESA; Pat Vance, the president of the ESRB; Strauss Zelnick, CEO of Take Two Interactive, Robert Altman, CEO of ZeniMax Media; Brent Bozell, founder of the Media Research Center; and Melissa Hanson, program manager for the Parents Television Council. The meeting was not designed to come to a solution but only for the invited parties to present their stance on video games and their relationship to violent activity as to try to determine appropriate steps in the future. At the start of the meeting, the President showed the attendees a short 88-second video of numerous violent video game segments put together by his staff, including the infamous "No Russian" level from Call of Duty: Modern Warfare 2, which featured the player watching and potentially participating in a massacre of civilians in an airport.

After the 2019 El Paso shooting, Trump said in a speech, "We must stop the glorification of violence in our society. This includes the gruesome and grisly video games that are now commonplace. It is too easy today for troubled youth to surround themselves with a culture that celebrates violence. We must stop or substantially reduce this and it has to begin immediately."

=== Online gambling ===
Trump supports online gambling, based on the following reasoning: "This has to happen because many other countries are doing it and like usual the U.S. is just missing out."

=== Pardons ===
Trump has said multiple times that if he were reelected in 2024, he would pardon participants in the January 6 United States Capitol attack.

On January 20, 2025, upon assuming the presidency again, Trump issued roughly 1,500 pardons and 14 commutations to people charged in connection to the January 6 United States Capitol attack.

== Science and technology ==
See also Climate change and pollution, above.

A 2016 report in Scientific American graded Trump and three other top presidential candidates—Hillary Clinton, Gary Johnson, and Jill Stein—on science policy, based on their responses to a twenty-question ScienceDebate.org survey. Trump "came in last on all counts" in grading, with scientists and researchers faulting him for a lack of knowledge or appreciation of scientific issues.

=== Space ===
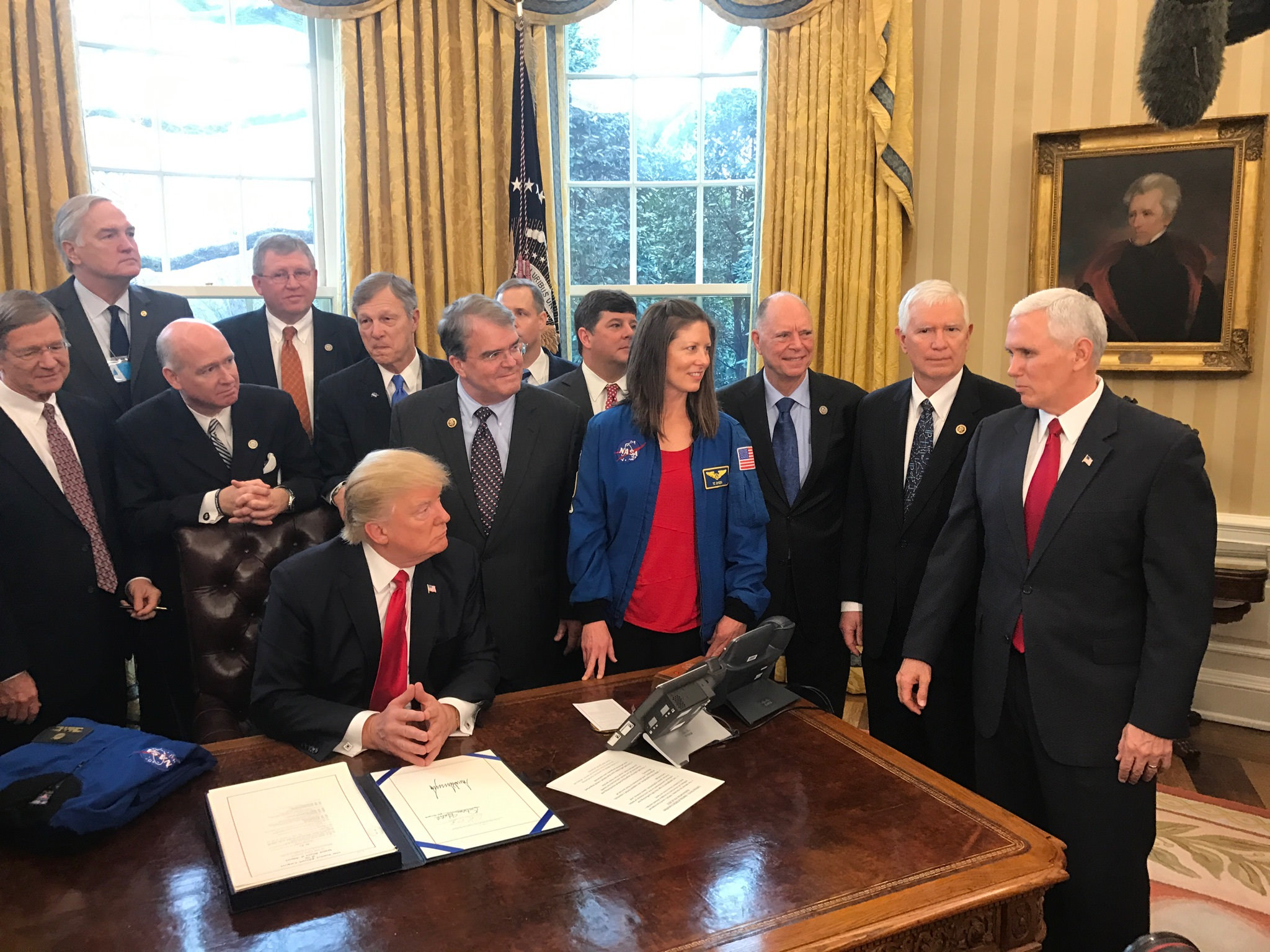
President Trump signing the NASA Transition Authorization Act of 2017

As of October 2016, one of Trump's policy advisors declared that, under Trump, NASA would recreate the National Space Council and pursue a goal of "human exploration of the solar system by the end of the century", to drive technology developments to a stronger degree than a crewed mission to Mars. Other goals would include shifting budget to deep space exploration from Earth science and climate research, and pursuit of small satellites and hypersonic technology. A possibility of China joining the International Space Station program was also considered. A stronger role of crewed Lunar exploration is possible in NASA's quest for a crewed mission to Mars. Prior to that statement, the Trump campaign appeared to have little to no space policy at all.

=== Technology and net neutrality ===
As of June 2016, Trump has published no tech policy proposals. On the campaign trail, Trump frequently antagonized Silicon Valley figures, using his Twitter account to lambast tech leaders such as Jeff Bezos of Amazon, Tim Cook of Apple, and Brian Chesky of Airbnb over a series of months. He is particularly concerned about the social breakdown of American culture caused by technology, and said, "the Internet and the whole computer age is really a mixed bag," having "complicated lives very greatly".

Trump is opposed to net neutrality, asserting that it is "Obama's attack on the internet" and saying that it "will target the conservative media."

Trump has suggested closing "certain areas" of the Internet. Regarding how this relates to freedom of speech, he added "Somebody will say, 'Oh freedom of speech, freedom of speech.' These are foolish people. We have a lot of foolish people."

The tech publication Recode reports that Trump has made no public statements on the issues of patent reform or broadband access.

The Free Press Action Fund, a group of tech policy activists, rated Trump the worst 2016 presidential candidate for "citizens' digital lives," citing his positions opposing reforming the Patriot Act, favoring Internet censorship, and opposing net neutrality.

== Social issues and civil liberties ==
=== Abortion ===
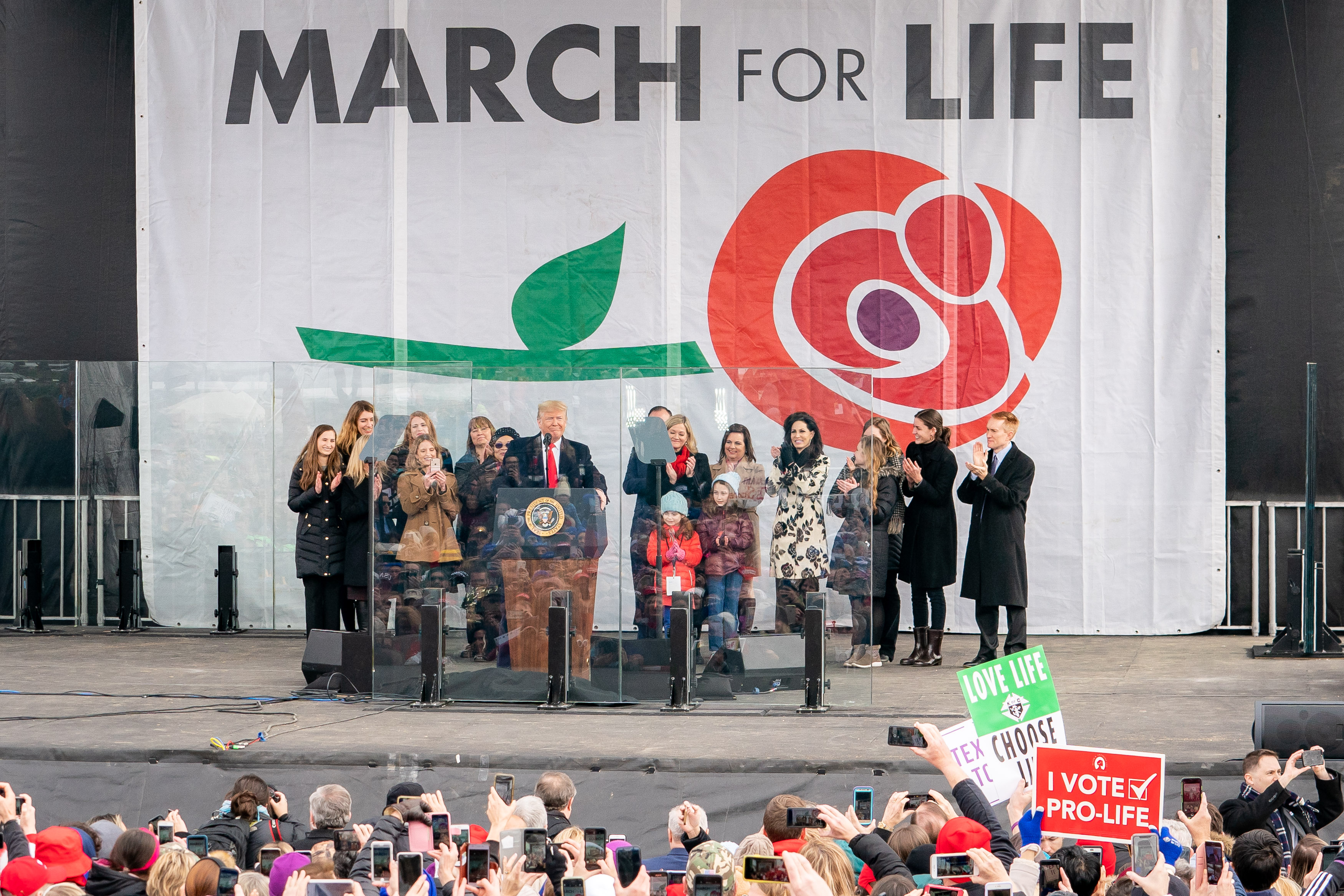
President Trump speaks at the 2020 March for Life.

Trump describes himself as pro-life and generally opposes abortion with some exceptions: rape, incest, and circumstances endangering the health of the mother. As a candidate in 2016, he said he believes the issue of abortion "would have been better if it were up to the states." He said he was committed to appointing justices who would overturn the ruling in Roe v. Wade.

In October 1999, during Trump's 2000 presidential campaign, he stated on Meet the Press "I am very pro-choice. I hate the concept of abortion. [...] But I am strongly pro-choice."

While contemplating a campaign for the 2012 Republican presidential nomination, Trump gave a speech at CPAC in 2011, where he stated he was pro-life, a stance he reiterated during his 2016 campaign.

After Roe v. Wade was overturned in Dobbs v. Jackson Women's Health Organization in 2022, Trump took credit for the decision but has not stated whether he supports a federal ban or federal restrictions on abortion.

During the second presidential debate in September 2024, Trump stated he would not sign a federal ban but declined to answer questions about whether he would veto such legislation.

=== LGBTQ rights ===
The Trump administration rolled back many existing LGBTQ protections and also introduced new policies that undermine LGBTQ rights.

In 2018, Richard Grenell was made the highest-ranking openly gay U.S. ambassador and the highest ranking openly gay official ever in a Republican administration.

In February 2019, it was announced that Grenell was leading the Trump administration's newly formed effort to promote the decriminalization of homosexuality in nations in which homosexuality was illegal. In April 2020, Grenell said the administration was considering policies to reduce intelligence-sharing with countries that criminalize homosexuality.

During the second Trump administration, Scott Bessent became the first openly gay person to lead the U.S. Treasury Department, becoming the highest-ranking LGBTQ government official in American history and the first openly gay U.S. Senate-confirmed Cabinet member in a Republican administration.

==== Workplace discrimination ====
In early 2017, Trump reversed an Obama-era directive that had required companies with large federal contracts to prove their compliance with LGBTQ protections.

In 2018, Trump signed the United States–Mexico–Canada trade agreement with a footnote exempting the United States from complying with the agreement's call for an end to "sex-based discrimination".

The Trump administration unsuccessfully tried to eliminate nondiscrimination protections at the level of the Supreme Court, where the Justice Department intervened in three employment lawsuits—Bostock v. Clayton County; Altitude Express, Inc. v. Zarda; and Harris Funeral Homes v. EEOC—arguing that Title VII of the Civil Rights Act of 1964 does not prohibit job discrimination based on sexual orientation or "transgender status." However, despite the Trump administration's intervention, the Supreme Court ruled on these three cases on June 15, 2020, that sexual orientation and gender identity are indeed covered under existing protections for "sex discrimination".

==== Healthcare discrimination ====
The Affordable Care Act included an Obama-era nondiscrimination provision that explicitly entitled people to receive care regardless of sex or gender identity, but the Trump administration reversed it. On June 12, 2020, the Department of Health and Human Services finalized and revealed its replacement rule. Now, healthcare providers and insurers may decide whether to serve transgender people.

==== Transgender rights ====
===== Pre 2016 =====
In 2012, prior to running for the presidency, Trump called for the exclusion of trans women from beauty pageants. He did not want Jenna Talackova to compete in the Miss USA pageants. However, Trump eventually overruled the rejection of Jenna Talackova, a transgender contestant for Miss Universe, allowing the transgender contestant to participate in the Miss Universe pageant, and he praised other contestants for supporting the inclusion of transgender women.

At a rally in October 2016, Trump called the open military service of transgender Americans a result of a "political correct military". He said he would seek new recommendations from military leaders on the topic of transgender personnel and would "very strongly" defer to those recommendations.

In April 2016, Trump criticized North Carolina's North Carolina House Bill 2, which eliminated all private employment and public accommodation anti-discrimination laws that were stricter than statewide law and required that, in government buildings, individuals may use only restrooms and changing facilities that correspond to the sex on their birth certificates. The bill was controversial because it prevented transgender people who do not or cannot alter their birth certificates from using the restroom consistent with their gender identity.

Trump said: "North Carolina did something that was very strong and they're paying a big price. ... You leave it the way it is. There have been very few complaints the way it is. People go, they use the bathroom they feel is appropriate, there has been so little trouble, and the problem with what happened in North Carolina is the strife, and the economic punishment that they're taking." He also said: "I fully understand if they [North Carolina] want to go through, but they are losing business and they are having a lot of people come out against."

Later that month, however, Trump expressed the opposite position that states have the right to enact such legislation and that the federal government should not become involved. He did not express an opinion on whether the law was right or wrong.

In July 2016, Trump again emphasized a states' rights approach regarding HB2, saying, "The state, they know what's going on, they see what's happening and generally speaking I'm with the state on things like this. I've spoken with your governor, I've spoken with a lot of people and I'm going with the state."

===== First term =====
One month after taking office, Trump reversed a directive from the Obama administration that had allowed transgender students to use bathrooms that correspond with their gender identity; this reversal allowed public schools to make their own rules about gendered bathrooms. In 2020, the U.S. Department of Education threatened to withhold funding from Connecticut school districts that allow transgender girls to compete on girls' teams, claiming that the transgender students' participation is a violation of Title IX.

Six months into his presidency, Trump tweeted that transgender individuals would not be allowed to serve "in any capacity" in the U.S. military, an order that took Pentagon officials by surprise. Eventually, in 2019, the Supreme Court—without hearing arguments or explaining its own decision—allowed the Trump administration to move ahead with the ban.

In 2018, the Department of Health and Human Services wrote a memo planning to establish a definition of gender based on sex assignment at birth. The memo argued in favor of a definition of gender "on a biological basis that is clear, grounded in science, objective and administrable" and the government's prerogative to genetically test individuals to determine their sex. If approved by the Justice Department, the definition would apply across federal agencies, notably the departments of Education, Justice, and Labor, which, along with Health and Human Services, are responsible for enforcing Title IX nondiscrimination statutes.

The Trump administration also reversed Obama-era guidance on transgender prisoners, ordering the Bureau of Prisons instead to house them according to their "biological sex."

In 2019, HUD proposed a new rule to weaken the 2012 Equal Access Rule, which requires equal access to housing regardless of sexual orientation or gender identity. This could allow homeless shelters to place transgender women in men's housing or to deny transgender people admission altogether.

===== Between presidencies (2021–2025) =====
In a 2021 speech at the Conservative Political Action Conference in Orlando, Florida, Trump referred to transgender women who are athletes as "biological males".

In April 2021 Donald Trump attacked Arkansas governor Asa Hutchinson for vetoing legislation that would have banned gender-affirming medical care for transgender minors.

In a video posted on his 2024 and during a Campaign Event in Fort Dodge, Iowa in November 2023 campaign website, Trump called gender-affirming care to minors "chemical, physical, sexual and emotional mutilation" and that he would pass a federal law banning it if in office. He also stated that he would have the Department of Justice investigate pharmaceutical companies and hospital networks to determine if they "covered up the long-term side effects of gender transitions" and would remove hospitals who provide gender-affirming care from receiving funds from both Medicare and Medicaid.

On his 2024 campaign website Trump states that he would direct Congress to pass a bill that would mandate the United States only recognize the male and female genders and that they are assigned at birth.

===== Second term (2025–present) =====
During his second presidency on January, 2025, Trump signed Executive Order 14168 which removed recognition of gender identity from the U.S. government, defines sex in the eyes of the federal government as a male-female binary biological classification, and attempts to end federal funding for "gender ideology".

During his second presidency on January 28, 2025, Trump signed Executive Order 14183 titled "Prioritizing Military Excellence and Readiness" that attempts to ban transgender people from military service.

During his second presidency on January 28, 2025, Trump signed Executive Order 14187 which directed federal agencies to withhold funding from institutions that provide gender-affirming care for minors (which the order labeled as "chemical and surgical mutilation") and calls for legal enforcement against such practices.

During his second presidency February 2025, Trump signed Executive Order 14201 titled "Keeping Men Out of Women's Sports" that attempts to ban transgender women athletes of all ages from competing on girls and women's sports teams.

==== Same-sex marriage ====
===== Before Presidencies =====
He had previously supported and been a proponent of civil unions and he included the policy in his 2000 presidential campaign as a Reform Party candidate.

Trump in 2011 said that he was "not in favor of gay marriage" and saying during his 2016 campaign that he would "strongly consider" appointing Supreme Court justices who were inclined to overturn Obergefell v. Hodges.

===== Post 2016 =====
After several decades of national debate, the U.S. Supreme Court legalized same-sex marriage nationwide in 2015 in the Obergefell v. Hodges ruling. After his election, Trump acknowledged that the court had already "settled" the issue.

Donald Trump's 2020 presidential campaign launched "Trump Pride", a coalition within the Trump campaign focused on outreach to LGBTQ voters, and stated that Trump now supports same-sex marriage.

In July, 2024, the Trump campaign successfully lobbied for the RNC to adopt a new platform which removed opposition to same-sex marriage.

==== Data collection ====
The Trump administration has made efforts to remove questions about LGBTQ identity and relationships from the 2020 census, the American Community Survey, the annual National Survey of Older Americans Act Participants, and the Adoption and Foster Care Analysis and Reporting System.

==== HIV/AIDS ====
In 2017, Trump dissolved the Office of National AIDS Policy and the Presidential Advisory Council on HIV/AIDS, both of which had existed since the 1990s. Every year on World AIDS Day—2017, 2018, 2019—Trump's proclamations have omitted mention of LGBTQ people.

==== Religion-based exemptions ====
In 2018, the Department of Health and Human Services (HHS) announced the creation of the Conscience and Religious Freedom Division. Its purpose is to enforce federal laws that related to "conscience and religious freedom"; that is, to enable individuals and businesses to exempt themselves from obeying nondiscrimination laws.

In 2019, HHS granted an exemption from an Obama-era nondiscrimination regulation to a foster care agency in South Carolina. HHS cited the Religious Freedom Restoration Act (RFRA) as a basis for allowing federally funded Christian groups to discriminate against non-Christians. Later that year, the Department of Labor, also referencing the RFRA, proposed a new rule to exempt "religious organizations" from obeying employment nondiscrimination law if they invoke "sincerely held religious tenets and beliefs" as their reason to discriminate. In 2020, the Justice Department filed a brief with the Supreme Court in support of another foster care agency in Pennsylvania, defending the agency's right to turn away same-sex couples as part of its "free exercise of religion".

In 2019, the State Department created the Commission on Unalienable Rights to initiate philosophical discussions of human rights that are grounded in the Catholic concept of "natural law" rather than modern identities based on gender and sexuality. Most of the twelve members of the commission have a history of anti-LGBTQ comments.

==== Education ====
In March 2022 Trump said he approved of Florida's Parental Rights in Education bill, also referred to as the "don't say gay" bill, during an interview with The Washington Post that occurred after the bill was signed by Florida governor Ron DeSantis, but did not elaborate as to why he supports it.

==== Diplomacy ====
The Trump administration eliminated the State Department's position for a Special Envoy for the Human Rights of LGBTI Persons.

In 2018, the Trump administration denied visas to the unmarried same-sex partners of foreign diplomats, even if they were from countries that recognize only civil partnership or that ban same-sex marriage.

Richard Grenell, nominated by Trump as the U.S. ambassador to Germany, is openly gay. In February 2019, Grenell was announced as the leader of a new campaign to decriminalize homosexuality worldwide, and he hosted a meeting with 11 European activists. Trump seemed unaware of the initiative when he was asked about it the next day. Several months later, Trump tweeted that, "as we celebrate LGBT Pride Month," Americans should "stand in solidarity with the many LGBT people who live in dozens of countries worldwide that punish, imprison, or even execute" people for their sexual orientation. However, that same week, the Trump administration instructed U.S. embassies not to fly the pride flag during Pride Month.

==== Judicial appointments ====
About one-third of Trump's judicial nominees have anti-LGBTQ records. The U.S. Senate has, as of May 2020, confirmed nearly 400 of Trump's nominees to their new roles. At least one of the confirmed judges, Patrick Bumatay, is openly gay.

=== Marijuana ===
Marijuana and the rights of individual states to legalize recreational and medical marijuana was an issue of Trump's presidential campaign, and he formally stated during his campaign that he believed states should have the right to manage their own policies with regard to medical and recreational marijuana. Following his election, he reversed his position on recreational marijuana and stated he believed medical marijuana should be allowed but stated the Federal Government may seek legal resolutions for those states which regulate the growth and sale of recreational marijuana. However, in April 2018, he once again reversed himself, endorsing leaving the issue to the states; and in June 2018, Trump backed a bill introduced by Republican senator Cory Gardner of Colorado and Democratic senator Elizabeth Warren of Massachusetts that would leave the decision to the states.

In September 2024 Trump expressed support for 2024 Florida Amendment 3, an amendment that would legalize cannabis in the state.

=== Religion in the public square ===
Trump wove Christian religious imagery into his 2024 presidential campaign, characterizing it as a "righteous crusade" against "atheists, globalists and the Marxists". He stated that his aims included restoring the United States "as one nation under God with liberty and justice for all".

Trump has been critical of what he sees as a persecution of Christians. On February 6, 2025, following the National Prayer Breakfast, he signed an executive order to create a task force to "immediately halt all forms of anti-Christian targeting and discrimination within the federal government, including at the DOJ, which was absolutely terrible, the IRS, the FBI — terrible — and other agencies". Donald Trump appointed Attorney General Pam Bondi to lead the task force and appointed Paula White to direct the White House Faith Office.

== Political positions and rhetoric ==
Beginning with his 2016 campaign, Trump's politics and rhetoric led to the creation of a political movement known as Trumpism. His political positions are populist, more specifically described as right-wing populist. In 2016, he helped bring far-right fringe ideas and organizations into the mainstream. Many of his actions and rhetoric have been described as authoritarian and contributing to democratic backsliding. Trump pushed for an expansion of presidential power under a maximalist interpretation of the unitary executive theory. His political base has been compared to a cult of personality.

Trump's rhetoric and actions have been accused of creating and exacerbating anger and distrust through the use of an "us" versus "them" narrative. He explicitly and routinely disparages racial, religious, and ethnic minorities, and scholars consistently find that racial animus regarding blacks, immigrants, and Muslims are the best predictors of support for Trump. His rhetoric has been described as using fearmongering and demagogy which intensified during his 2024 presidential campaign. He has said that he believes real power comes from fear. The alt-right movement coalesced around and supported his candidacy, due in part to its opposition to multiculturalism and immigration. He has a strong appeal to evangelical Christian voters and Christian nationalists, and his rallies take on the symbols, rhetoric, and agenda of Christian nationalism. Trump has also used anti-communist sentiment in his rhetoric, regularly calling his opponents "communists" and "Marxists".

=== Relationship with Congress ===
Donald Trump acknowledged after the midterm elections that the war in Iran was a factor in the Republican loss. He told Fox News that Democrats were sending bills to the White House that he called "insane" and that he would veto them. "They'll send over things that are insane, and I'll veto them," Trump added. "And after a few months of vetoing them, they call and say, 'How do we do this?' And we'll work together."

=== Racial and gender views ===
Many of Trump's comments and actions have been characterized as racist. In a 2018 national poll, about half of respondents said he is racist; a greater proportion believed that he emboldened racists. Several studies and surveys found that racist attitudes fueled his political ascent and were more important than economic factors in determining the allegiance of Trump voters. Racist and Islamophobic attitudes are strong indicators of support for Trump. He has been accused of racism for insisting a group of five black and Latino teenagers were guilty of raping a white woman in the 1989 Central Park jogger case, even after they were exonerated in 2002.

In 2011, Trump became the leading proponent of the racist "birther" conspiracy theory that Barack Obama, the first black U.S. president, was not born in the United States. He claimed credit for pressuring the government to publish Obama's birth certificate, which he falsely considered fraudulent. In September 2016, he acknowledged that Obama was born in the U.S., though he reportedly expressed birther views privately in 2017. During the 2024 presidential campaign, he made false attacks against the racial identity of his opponent, Kamala Harris, that were described as reminiscent of the birther conspiracy theory. His 2024 campaign made extensive use of dehumanizing language and racial stereotypes.

Trump's comments on the 2017 Unite the Right rally, condemning "this egregious display of hatred, bigotry and violence on many sides" and stating that there were "very fine people on both sides", were criticized as implying a moral equivalence between the white supremacist demonstrators and the counter-protesters. In a January 2018 discussion of immigration legislation, he reportedly referred to El Salvador, Haiti, Honduras, and African nations as "shithole countries", remarks condemned as racist.

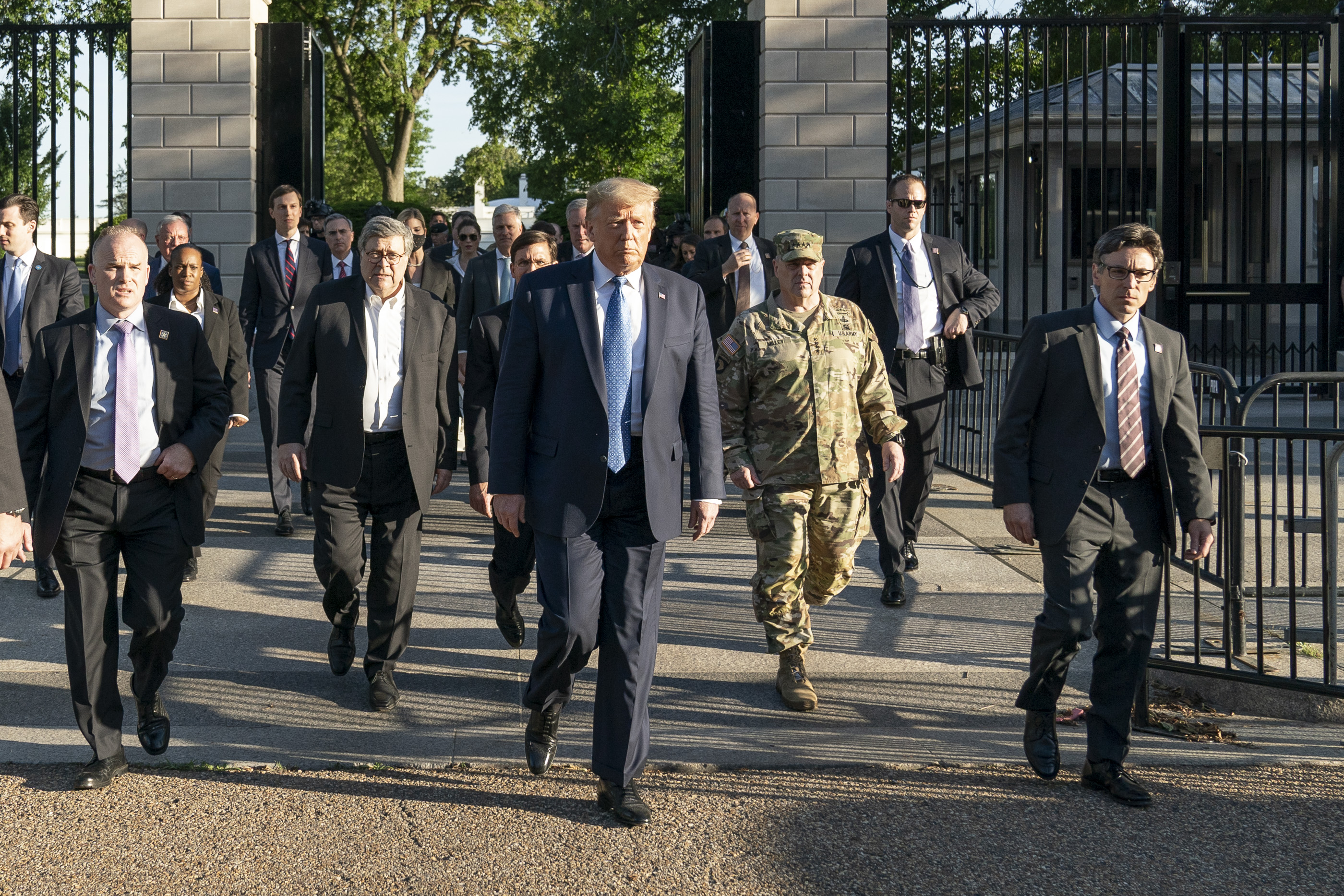
With a group of officials and advisors walking from the White House to St. John's Church, following the forced removal of protesters at Lafayette Square

In July 2019, Trump tweeted that four Democratic congresswomen—three of whom are native-born Americans—should "go back" to the countries they "came from". Two days later, the House of Representatives voted 240–187 to condemn his "racist comments".

In June 2020, during the George Floyd protests, federal law-enforcement officials used tear gas and other crowd control tactics to remove a largely peaceful crowd of lawful protesters from Lafayette Square, outside the White House. Trump then posed with a Bible for a photo op at the nearby St. John's Episcopal Church, with religious leaders condemning both the treatment of protesters and the photo opportunity itself.

Trump has a history of belittling women when speaking to the media and on social media. He made lewd comments, disparaged women's physical appearances, and referred to them using derogatory epithets. As of 2020, 26 women have publicly accused him of sexual misconduct, including rape, kissing without consent, groping, looking under women's skirts, and walking in on naked teenage pageant contestants. He has denied the allegations. In October 2016, a 2005 "hot mic" recording surfaced in which he bragged about kissing and groping women without their consent, saying that, "when you're a star, they let you do it. You can do anything. ... Grab 'em by the pussy." He characterized the comments as "locker-room talk". The incident's widespread media exposure led to his first public apology, videotaped during his 2016 presidential campaign.

=== Link to violence and hate crimes ===
Trump has been identified as a key figure in increasing political violence in the U.S., both for and against him. He is described as embracing extremism, conspiracy theories such as QAnon, and far-right militia movements to a greater extent than any modern American president, and engaging in stochastic terrorism.

Research suggests that Trump's rhetoric is associated with an increased incidence of hate crimes, and that he has an emboldening effect on expressing prejudicial attitudes due to his normalization of explicit racial rhetoric. During his 2016 campaign, he urged or praised physical attacks against protesters or reporters. Numerous defendants investigated or prosecuted for violent acts and hate crimes cited his rhetoric in arguing that they were not culpable or should receive leniency. A nationwide review by ABC News in May 2020 identified at least 54 criminal cases, from August 2015 to April 2020, in which he was invoked in direct connection with violence or threats of violence mostly by white men and primarily against minorities. Trump's refusal to condemn the white supremacist Proud Boys during a 2020 presidential debate and his comment, "Proud Boys, stand back and stand by", were said to have led to increased recruitment for the pro-Trump group. Counterterrorism researchers described his normalization and revisionist history of the January 6 Capitol attack, and grant of clemency to all January 6 rioters, as encouraging future political violence.

=== Conspiracy theories ===
Since before his first presidency, Trump has promoted numerous conspiracy theories, including Obama "birtherism", climate change denial, and alleged Ukrainian interference in U.S. elections. After the 2020 presidential election, he promoted conspiracy theories for his defeat that were characterized as "the big lie".

=== False or misleading statements ===
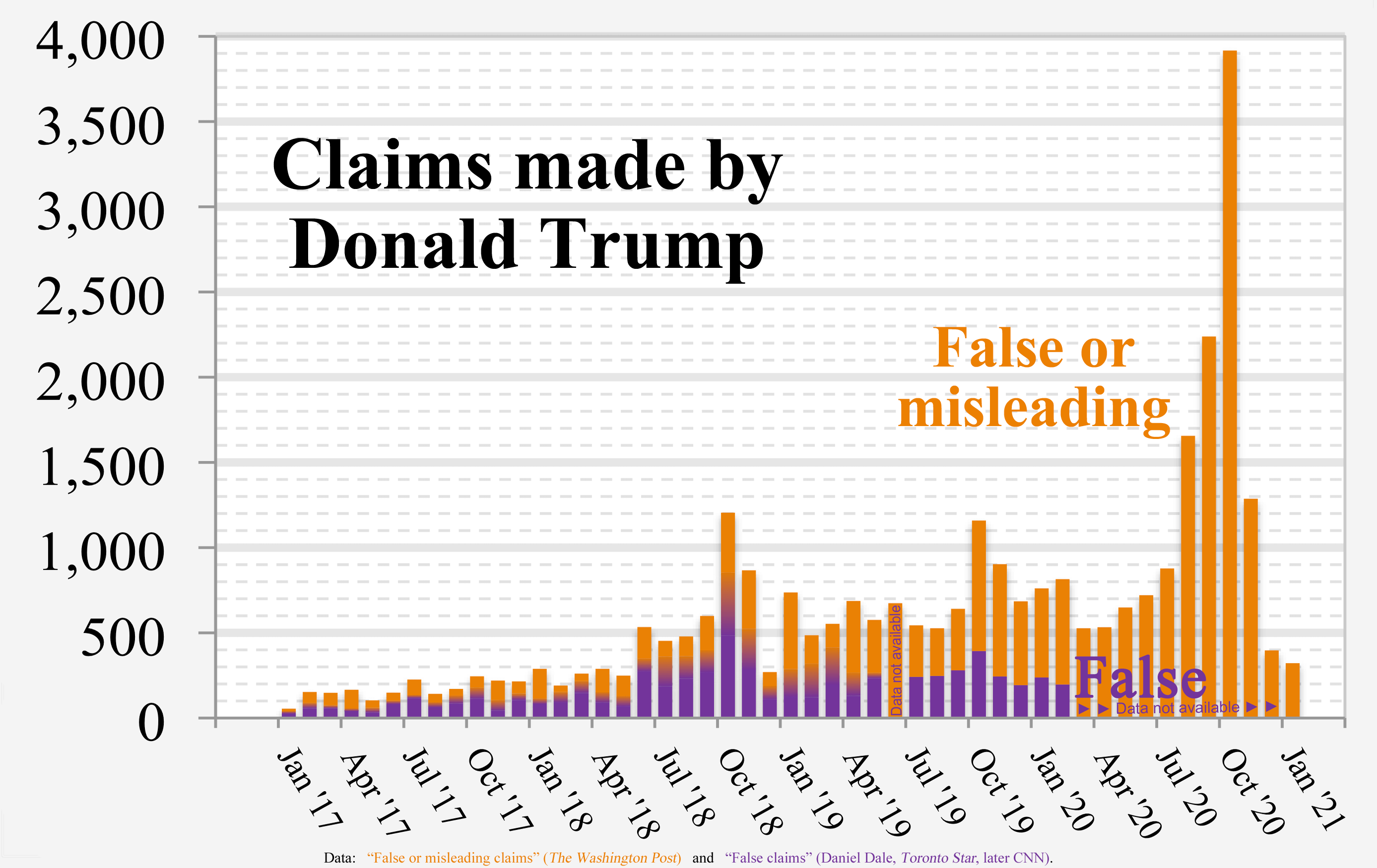
Fact-checkers from The Washington Post, the Toronto Star, and CNN compiled data on "false or misleading claims" (orange background) and "false claims" (violet foreground).

Trump frequently makes false statements in public remarks, to an extent that was unprecedented in American politics. His falsehoods are a distinctive part of his political identity and have been described as firehosing. His false and misleading statements were documented by fact-checkers, including at The Washington Post, which tallied 30,573 false or misleading statements made by him during his first presidency, increasing in frequency over time.

Some of Trump's falsehoods were inconsequential, while others had more far-reaching effects, such as his unproven promotion of antimalarial drugs as a treatment for COVID-19, causing a U.S. shortage of these drugs and panic buying in Africa and South Asia. Other misinformation, such as misattributing a rise in crime in England and Wales to the "spread of radical Islamic terror", served his domestic political purposes. His attacks on mail-in ballots and other election practices weakened public faith in the integrity of the 2020 presidential election, while his disinformation about the pandemic delayed and weakened the national response to it. He habitually does not apologize for his falsehoods. Until 2018, the media rarely referred to his falsehoods as lies, including when he repeated demonstrably false statements.

=== Social media ===
Trump's social media presence attracted worldwide attention after he joined Twitter in 2009. He posted frequently during his 2016 campaign and as president until Twitter banned him after the January 6 attack. He often used Twitter to communicate directly with the public and sideline the press; in 2017, his press secretary said that his tweets constituted official presidential statements. During his 2024 campaign and second presidency, he frequently posted AI-generated content of himself as pop-culture icons or mocking immigrants.

After years of criticism for allowing Trump to post misinformation and falsehoods, Twitter began to tag some of his tweets with fact-checks in May 2020. In response, he said social media platforms "totally silence" conservatives and he would "strongly regulate, or close them down". After the January 6 attack, he was banned from Facebook, Instagram, Twitter, and other platforms. The loss of his social media presence diminished his ability to shape events and correlated with a dramatic decrease in the volume of misinformation on Twitter. In February 2022, he launched social media platform Truth Social where he attracted a fraction of his Twitter following. Twitter reinstated his account in November 2022. The two-year ban at Meta Platforms lapsed in January 2023, allowing him to return to Facebook and Instagram.

=== Relationship with the press ===
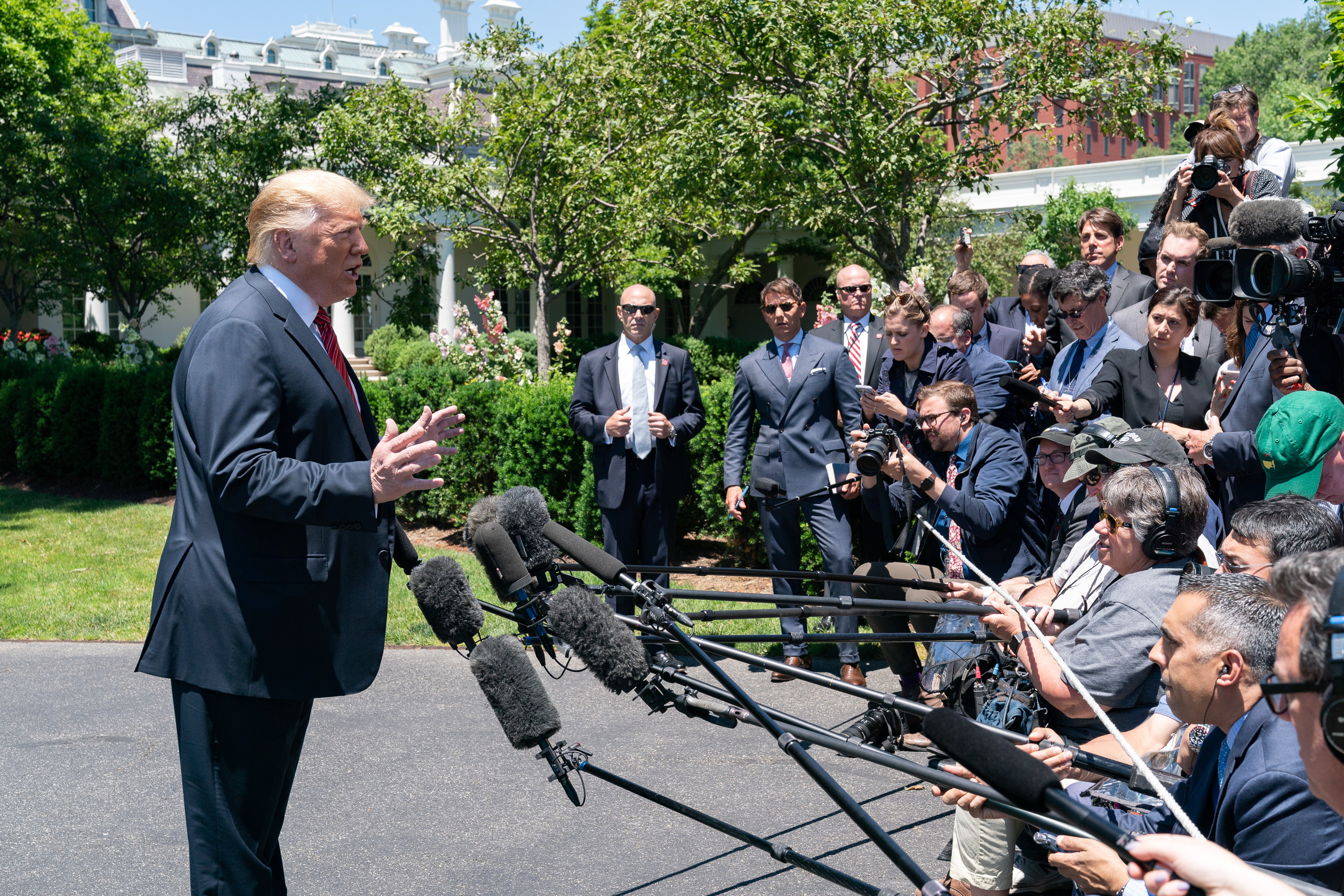
Talking to the press, June 2019

Trump sought media attention throughout his career, maintaining a "love-hate" relationship with the press. In the 2016 campaign, he benefited from a record amount of free media coverage, estimated at $2 billion. As a candidate and as president, he frequently accused the press of bias, calling it the "fake news media" and "the enemy of the people".

The first Trump presidency reduced formal press briefings from about one hundred in 2017 to about half that in 2018 and to two in 2019. They also revoked the press passes of two White House reporters, which were restored by the courts. His 2020 presidential campaign sued The New York Times, The Washington Post, and CNN for defamation in opinion pieces about his stance on Russian election interference. All the suits were dismissed. By 2024, he repeatedly voiced support for outlawing political dissent and criticism, and said that reporters should be prosecuted for not divulging confidential sources and media companies should possibly lose their broadcast licenses for unfavorable coverage of him.

In his second term, Trump's actions against the media were unprecedented in modern American history, and historians described them as mirroring actions by authoritarian leaders to censor political opponents and negatively impacting the freedom of speech and free press. The campaign to police speech drew comparisons to cancel culture, government censorship, and McCarthyism. Some were sued and many social media companies, broadcasters, and newspapers capitulated to the Trump agenda. Trump launched lawsuits and created blacklists against certain media outlets, took over the process run by the White House Correspondents' Association to choose what outlets have access to him and made a policy of limited access for all wire services. The Federal Communications Commission launched investigations into media outlets accused of bias against him. As a result of Trump's threats, media executives instructed journalists and their staff to self-censor and reduce criticism of Trump, and CBS agreed to create an Ombudsman to monitor its news channels to root out "bias" at CBS News.

== Public opinion ==
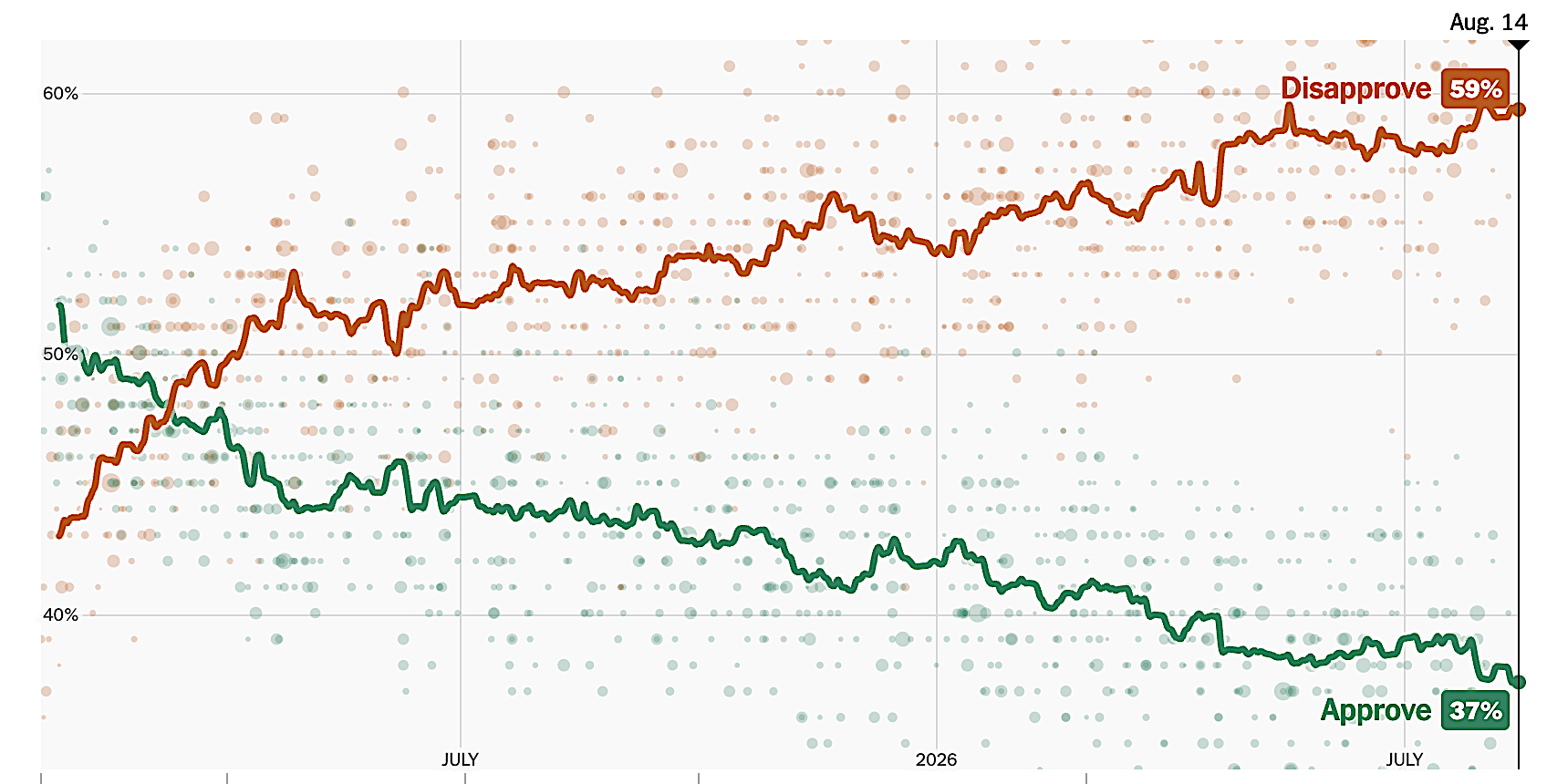
Trump's aggregated presidential approval ratings, with more disapproval ratings than approval ratings two months after his election, and disapproval ratings rising to over 50% after three months.

== See also ==
- Donald Trump 2016 presidential campaign § Political positions
- Donald Trump 2020 presidential campaign § Political positions
- Donald Trump 2024 presidential campaign § Political positions
- Fascism: A Warning – Book by Madeleine Albright, 2018
- First presidency of Donald Trump – 2017–2021 U.S. presidential administration
- Second presidency of Donald Trump – U.S. presidential administration since 2025
- Social media use by Donald Trump
