= Marijuana Policy Coordination Committee =

The Marijuana Policy Coordination Committee is a United States federal government interagency committee created during the first Trump Administration, which includes the Drug Enforcement Administration, and is coordinated by the Office of National Drug Control Policy (ONDCP). Some media have called it "secret anti-cannabis agency", "a uniquely Trumpian government body ... launched in secret for reasons the administration won't explain", and a "secretly amassed committee of federal agencies from across the government to combat public support for marijuana".

The committee's existence was "previously unknown" until it was described in an August, 2018 BuzzFeed News investigatory report by Dominic Holden. In a reaction to the journalism for The Hill, the national Drug Policy Alliance called it "mind-boggling, and underscores this Administration’s ineptitude on drug policy", and a California cannabis rights advocacy group called it an assembly of "department-wide prohibitionist cabals". Federal authorities in Denver contacted by local television news said they hadn't heard of the committee.

Political analysis by MassCentral.com said the ONDCP is "required by statute to 'take such actions as necessary to oppose any attempt to legalize'" cannabis at the federal level, and would be "intent on getting Donald Trump to reconsider his support for letting states go their own way in this area", labeling the effort anti-federalism.

== See also ==
- Cannabis policy of the Donald Trump administration
