= Political positions of Ron Paul =

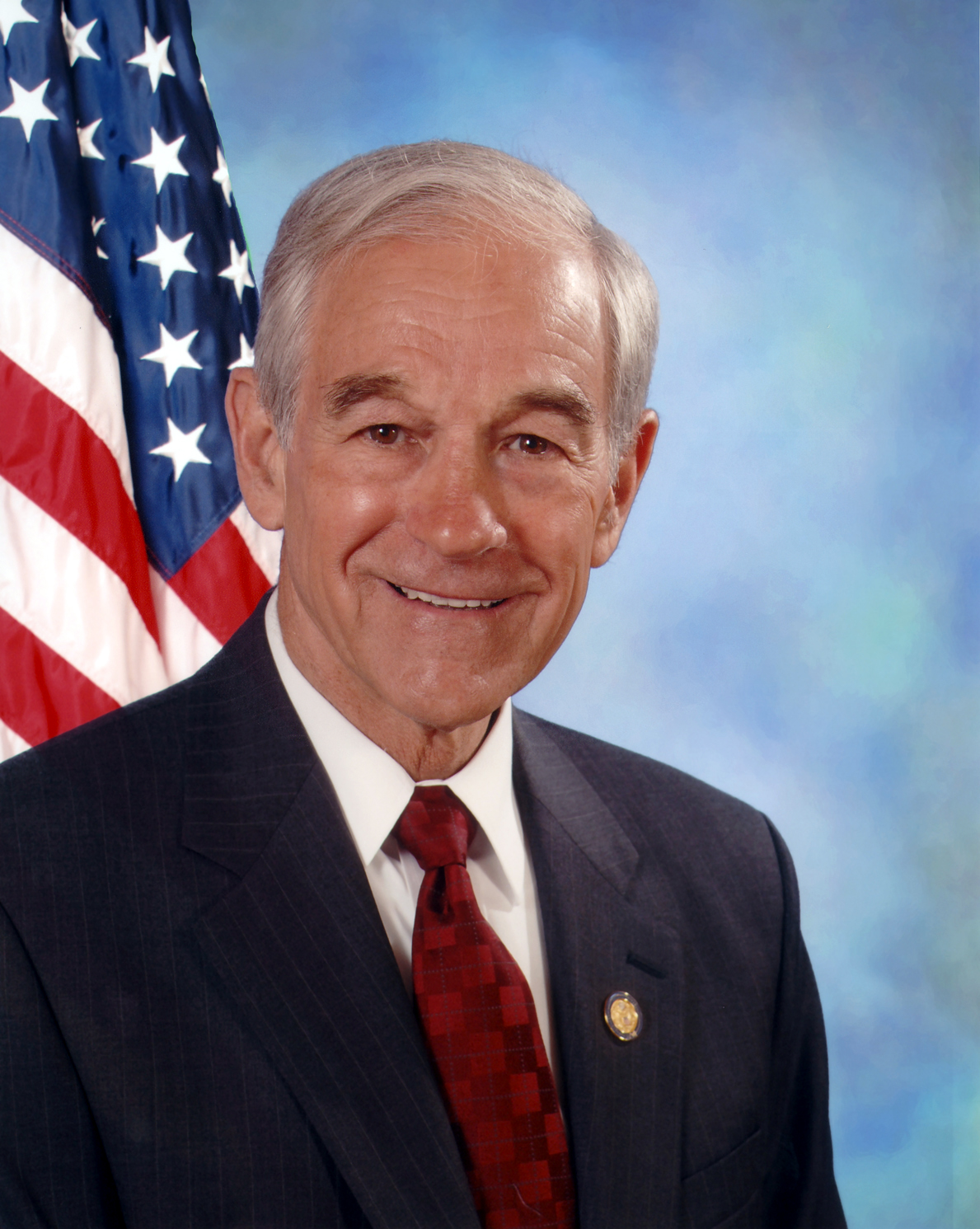
Congressional portrait, 2007

Ron Paul is an American author, activist, and retired politician who served in the House of Representatives for 12 non-consecutive terms and ran for President of the United States on three occasions. His political views are generally described as libertarian, but have also been labeled conservative. Paul's nickname "Dr. No" reflects both his medical degree and his assertion that he will "never vote for legislation unless the proposed measure is expressly authorized by the Constitution". This position has frequently resulted in Paul casting the sole "no" vote against proposed legislation. In one 2007 speech, he said he believes that "the proper role for government in America is to provide national defense, a court system for civil disputes, a criminal justice system for acts of force and fraud, and little else."

== Economy ==
A believer in a tax basis favoring the federal vs local revenue structure more in line with pre-World War II, in January 2008, Paul released an economic revitalization plan and named Peter Schiff and Donald L. Luskin as economic advisors to his campaign. National Journal labeled Paul's overall economic policies in 2010 as more conservative than 78% of the House and more liberal than 22% of the House (85% and 15%, respectively for 2009). For 2008, his ratings were more conservative than 91% of the House and more liberal than 8% of the House (80% and 20%, respectively for 2007). In 2006, as more conservative than 48% of the House and more liberal than 51% of the House.

His warnings of an impending financial crisis and a loss of confidence in the dollar in 2005 and 2006 were at the time derided by many economists, but accelerating dollar devaluation in 2007 led experts like former Federal Reserve chair Alan Greenspan to reconsider hard money policies such as those of Paul.

=== Lower spending and smaller government ===
Paul believes the size of the federal government must be decreased substantially. In order to restrict the federal government to what he believes are its Constitutionally authorized functions, he regularly voted against almost all proposals for new government spending, initiatives, or taxes, in many cases making him in a minority of members of the house by doing so. For example, on January 22, 2007, Paul was the lone member out of 415 voting to oppose a House measure to create a National Archives exhibit on slavery and Reconstruction, seeing this as an unauthorized use of taxpayer money.

Paul advocates substantially reducing the federal government's role in local affairs, individual lives and in the functions of foreign and domestic states; he says Republicans have lost their commitment to limited government and have become the party of big government. In the 2012 Republican Presidential Primary, Paul cited President Dwight Eisenhower's farewell address warnings about the growing presence and strength of the "military-industrial complex". His 2012 "Plan to Restore America" would eliminate five Cabinet-level departments: Energy, HUD, Commerce, Interior, and Education. He has called for elimination of other federal agencies such as the U.S. Department of Health and Human Services, and the Internal Revenue Service, calling them "unnecessary bureaucracies". Paul would severely reduce the role of the Central Intelligence Agency; reducing its functions to intelligence-gathering. He would eliminate operations like overthrowing foreign governments and assassinations. He says this activity is kept secret even from Congress and "leads to trouble". He also commented, "We have every right in the world to know something about intelligence gathering, but we have to have intelligent people interpreting this information."

Paul calls for the elimination of the Federal Emergency Management Agency (FEMA), which is tasked with coordinating preparedness and relief for natural disasters. He regards the argument for FEMA as "symptomatic of a blind belief in big government's ability to do anything and everything for anyone and everyone ... When people are starving, injured and dying they need speed and efficiency, yet FEMA comes along with forms and policies and rubber stamps." He complains that FEMA is a mismanaged and nearly-bankrupt bureaucracy, open to corruption. He also argues that the socialized insurance concept which underlies FEMA is deeply flawed, encouraging risk-taking – such as building beachfront homes in hurricane-prone coastal areas – that would be too expensive to consider if the sole source of disaster insurance were private-sector insurance purchased in the free market. In his view, disaster response management should be coordinated at the state and local level, without any federal involvement, and should be entirely voluntary and based on charitable goodwill. As Hurricane Irene bore down on the country's coast in August 2011, Paul said, "I live on the Gulf Coast. We put up with hurricanes all the time ... In 1900, before FEMA, the local people rebuilt the city, built a seawall, and they survived without FEMA ..."

In a speech on June 25, 2003, criticizing giving Prime Minister of the United Kingdom Tony Blair a Congressional Gold Medal of Honor, Paul said, "These medals generally have been proposed to recognize a life of service and leadership, and not for political reasons—as evidenced by the overwhelming bipartisan support for awarding President Reagan, a Republican, a gold medal. These awards normally go to deserving individuals, which is why I have many times offered to contribute $100 of my own money, to be matched by other members, to finance these medals." Texas Monthly awarded him the "Bum Steer" award for voting against a congressional honor for cartoonist Charles Schulz, but also noted, "When he was criticized for voting against the [Parks] medal, he chided his colleagues by challenging them to personally contribute $100 to mint the medal. No one did. At the time, Paul observed, 'It's easier to be generous with other people's money.'" In February 2009, he joined with Democratic congressman Harry Mitchell of Arizona to call for an end to automatic Congressional pay increases, through a proposed amendment to the economic stimulus package.

There are criticisms which contend that Paul's position is disingenuous because he often requests earmarks for bills that he supposedly knows will pass no matter which way he votes. For example, during 2007, he requested about $400 million in earmarks in bills he voted against. A spokesman in the Fox News article says, "Reducing earmarks does not reduce government spending, and it does not prohibit spending upon those things that are earmarked. What people who push earmark reform are doing is they are particularly misleading the public—and I have to presume it's not by accident." One group supporting fiscal conservatism finds Paul's actions with earmarks to be contradictory and cites his 2003 speech regarding the award of a Congressional Gold Medal, at which time the Congressman declared, "I will continue in my uncompromising opposition to appropriations not authorized within the enumerated powers of the Constitution;" however, Paul himself has inserted appropriations for projects such as the renovation of a movie theater and subsidies for the shrimp industry, whereas reportedly, "neither of which is envisioned in the Constitution as an essential government function". The Congressman has responded to criticism about earmarks by providing an explanation in his weekly column. Paul says, "In an already flawed system, earmarks can at least allow residents of Congressional districts to have a greater role in allocating federal funds – their tax dollars – than if the money is allocated behind locked doors by bureaucrats."

=== Plan to Restore America (2013 budget) ===
In October 2011, Paul released a federal budget proposal for 2013, entitled the "Plan to Restore America". The plan calls for cutting $1 trillion from the federal budget in the first year, along with other measures which Paul says would balance the federal budget within 3 years. To achieve these goals, the plan would seek:

Spending cuts:

- eliminate five cabinet-level agencies (Education, Interior, Commerce, Energy, and Housing and Urban Development)
- privatize the FAA and the TSA
- cut the federal workforce by 10%
- cut funding (down from 2006 levels) for the

Food and Drug Administration by 40%
Centers for Disease Control by 20%
Department of Homeland Security by 20%
National Institutes of Health by 20%
Environmental Protection Agency by 30%
Substance Abuse and Mental Health Services Administration by 20%

- cut the Department of Defense budget by total 15%; eliminate all foreign war funding
- freeze funding for most other federal agencies at 2006 levels
- eliminate all foreign aid
- eliminate international drug programs
- substantially reduce federal travel
- eliminate international organizations and commissions
- administer Medicaid and other joint federal-state social welfare programs (SCHIP, food stamps, etc.) through block-grant funding mechanisms to the states

Revenue changes:

- cut the top corporate tax rate to 15% (down from 35%)
- allow companies to repatriate capital without additional taxation
- permanently extend the Bush administration tax cuts
- eliminate capital gains and dividends taxes
- eliminate estate and gift taxes
- end taxes on personal savings
- sell federal lands and other federal assets

Other economic and regulatory measures:

- repeal the new healthcare law ("Obamacare") as well as the Dodd–Frank and Sarbanes–Oxley financial services and banking regulations
- cancel certain "onerous" regulations instituted under executive order by previous presidents
- conduct a full audit of the Federal Reserve
- seek competing currency legislation "to strengthen the dollar and stabilize inflation"

Social Security and Medicare commitments to older workers and retirees would be honored, while workers younger than 25 would be given the option to opt out of participating in these programs. The Veterans Administration would be the only agency whose funds would be maintained at current levels of growth. Federal-state social welfare programs like Medicaid would be shifted from the mandatory section of the budget to the discretionary section, so that Congress would need to approve funding allocations each year.

The president's salary would be cut from $400,000 to approximately $39,000 per year (the median personal income of the American worker), and congressional pay and perks would be slashed.

Paul has stressed that certain essential responsibilities currently performed by agencies that he proposes to eliminate would be assumed by remaining agencies, or in the case of aviation management (FAA and TSA), would be transferred to the private sector.

Although Paul has often said that his ultimate goal is to abolish the Internal Revenue Service and eliminate the income tax, the Plan to Restore America does not address that specific goal.

Following the unveiling of the plan, critics were quick to remark on the negative consequences for the economy that budget changes of the magnitude being proposed could have in the short term. Kevin Hassett, economic policy director of the American Enterprise Institute and chief economic adviser to John McCain's 2000 presidential campaign, praised Paul's aim of reducing the size of government but worried that, "At the scale he's talking about, it's unlikely you could have an immediate reduction in government without hurtling the economy into recession." Economist Dean Baker, of the Center for Economic and Policy Research, said that "This is almost having the economy fall off a cliff."

=== Lower taxes ===
Paul's campaign slogan for 2004 was "The Taxpayers' Best Friend!" He would completely eliminate the income tax by shrinking the size and scope of government to what he considers its Constitutional limits, noting that he has never voted to approve an unbalanced budget; he has observed that even scaling back spending to 2000 levels eliminates the need for the 42% of the budget accounted for by individual income tax receipts. He has asserted that Congress had no power to impose a direct income tax and supports the repeal of the Sixteenth Amendment. Rather than taxing personal income, which he says assumes that the government owns individuals' lives and labor, he prefers the federal government to be funded through excise taxes and/or uniform, non-protectionist tariffs. However, during the 2011 CPAC conference, he said he would support a flat income tax of 10% at 19:23 of that speech. A citizen would be able to opt out of all government involvement if they simply pay a 10% income tax.

Paul has signed a pledge not to raise taxes or create new taxes, given by Americans for Tax Freedom. Paul has also been an advocate of employee-owned corporations (such as employee stock ownership plans). In 1999, he co-sponsored The Employee Ownership Act of 1999, which would have created a new type of corporation (the employee-owned-and-controlled corporation) that would have been exempt from most federal income taxes.

Paul's position on taxes has led to support for him from the National Taxpayers Union, and the National Federation of Independent Business.

Paul has stated: "I agree on getting rid of the IRS, but I want to replace it with nothing, not another tax. But let's not forget the inflation tax." In other statements, he has permitted consideration of a national sales tax as a compromise if the tax need cannot be reduced enough. He has advocated that the reduction of government will make an income tax unnecessary.

=== Inflation and the Federal Reserve ===
In the words of the New York Times, Paul is "not a fan" of the Federal Reserve. In his own words, Paul advocates that we should "End the Fed". Paul's opposition to the Fed is supported by the Austrian Business Cycle Theory, which holds that instead of containing inflation, the Federal Reserve, in theory and in practice, is responsible for causing inflation. In addition to eroding the value of individual savings, this creation of inflation leads to booms and busts in the economy. Thus Paul argues that government, via a central bank (the Federal Reserve), is the primary cause of economic recessions and depressions. He believes that economic volatility is decreased when the free market determines interest rates and money supply. He has stated in numerous speeches that most of his colleagues in Congress are unwilling to abolish the central bank because it funds many government activities. He says that to compensate for eliminating the "hidden tax" of monetary inflation, Congress and the president would instead have to raise taxes or cut government services, either of which could be politically damaging to their reputations. He states that the "inflation tax" is a tax on the poor, because the Federal Reserve prints more money which subsidizes select industries, while poor people pay higher prices for goods as more money is placed in circulation.

Paul adheres to Austrian School economics and libertarian criticism of fractional-reserve banking, opposing fiat currency and the monetary inflation. He views monetary inflation as an underhanded form of taxation, because it takes value away from the money that individuals hold without having to directly tax them. He sees the creation of the Federal Reserve, and its ability to "print money out of thin air" without commodity backing, as responsible for eroding the value of money, observing that "a dollar today is worth 4 cents compared to a dollar in 1913 when the Federal Reserve got in." In 1982, Paul was the prime mover in the creation of the U.S. Gold Commission, and in many public speeches Paul has voiced concern over the dominance of the current banking system and called for the return to a commodity-backed currency through a gradual reintroduction of hard currency, including both gold and silver. A commodity standard binds currency issue to the value of that commodity rather than fiat, making the value of the currency as stable as the commodity.

He condemns the role of the Federal Reserve and the national debt in creating monetary inflation. The minority report of the U.S. Gold Commission states that the federal and state governments are strictly limited in their monetary role by Article One, Section Eight, Clauses 2, 5, and 6, and Section Ten, Clause 1, "The Constitution forbids the states to make anything but gold and silver coin a tender in payment of debt, nor does it permit the federal government to make anything a legal tender." The Commission also recommended that the federal government "restore a definition for the term 'dollar'. We suggest defining a 'dollar' as a weight of gold of a certain fineness, .999 fine." On multiple occasions in congressional hearings he has sharply challenged two different chairmen of the Federal Reserve, Alan Greenspan and Ben Bernanke.

He has also called for the removal of all taxes on gold transactions. He has repeatedly introduced the Federal Reserve Board Abolition Act since 1999, to enable "America to return to the type of monetary system envisioned by our Nation's founders: one where the value of money is consistent because it is tied to a commodity such as gold". He opposes dependency on paper fiat money, but also says that there "were some shortcomings of the gold standard of the 19th century ... because it was a fixed price and caused confusion." He argues that hard money, such as backed by gold or silver, would prevent monetary inflation (and, thus, would inhibit price inflation), but adds, "I wouldn't exactly go back on the gold standard but I would legalize the constitution where gold and silver should and could be legal tender, which would restrain the Federal Government from spending and then turning that over to the Federal Reserve and letting the Federal Reserve print the money."

Paul supports legalization of parallel currencies, such as gold-backed notes issued from private markets and digital gold currencies. He would like gold-backed notes (or other types of hard money) and digital gold currencies to compete on a level playing field with Federal Reserve Notes, allowing individuals a choice whether to use sound money or to continue using fiat money. Paul believes this would restrain monetary and price inflation, limit government spending, and eventually eliminate the ability of the Federal Reserve to "tax" Americans through monetary inflation (i.e., by reducing the purchasing power of the currency they are holding), which he sees as "the most insidious of all taxes".

He suggests that current efforts to sustain dollar hegemony, especially since the collapse of the Bretton Woods system following the United States' suspension of the dollar's conversion to gold in 1971, exacerbate a rationale for war. Consequently, when petroleum producing nations like Iraq, Iran, or Venezuela elect to trade in Petroeuro instead of Petrodollar, it devalues an already overly inflated dollar, further eroding its supremacy as a global currency. According to Paul, along with vested American interests in oil and plans to "remake the Middle East", this scenario has proven a contributing factor for the war in Iraq and diplomatic tensions with Iran.

=== Nonviolent tax resistance ===
In an interview with economic analyst and commentator Neil Cavuto on Fox News Channel, June 26, 2007, in speaking of income tax resistance, Paul said that he supports the right of those who engage in nonviolent resistance when they believe a law is unjust, bringing up the names of Martin Luther King Jr., Lysander Spooner, and Mahatma Gandhi as examples of practitioners of peaceful civil disobedience; but he cautioned that those who do should be aware that the consequences could be imprisonment. He said that current income tax laws assume that people are guilty and they must then prove they are innocent, and he believes this aspect of tax law is unfair. However, he said that he prefers to work for improved tax laws by getting elected to Congress and trying to change the laws themselves rather than simply not paying the tax.

=== Social Security ===
Paul has given 12 updates on his Texas Straight Talk archive on the issue of Social Security. Paul considers Social Security unconstitutional, and he has sought for many years for the program to be phased out. He says that the Social Security system, which he has called "a giant Ponzi scheme," is in "bad shape ... The numbers aren't there"; funds are depleting because Congress borrows from the Social Security fund every year to fund its budget. Paul's 2013 budget proposal would guarantee to uphold Social Security commitments to older workers while allowing Americans under 25 to opt out of participating in the program.

=== Minimal market interference ===
Paul endorses defederalization of the health care system. Paul also states that he has an opposition to virtually all federal interference with the market process.

Paul was one of only eight members of the entire Congress who voted to block implementation of the National Do Not Call Registry act, which prohibits telemarketers from telephoning those who have opted out of receiving such advertising. He argued that "legislation to regulate telemarketing would allow the government to intrude further into our lives," and that "The fact that the privately run Direct Marketing Association is operating its own 'do-not-call' list is evidence that consumers need not rely upon the national government to address the problems associated with telemarketers."

Paul was one of three members of Congress that voted against the Sarbanes–Oxley Act: it "imposes costly new regulations on the financial services industry [that] are damaging American capital markets by providing an incentive for small US firms and foreign firms to deregister from US stock exchanges". The Sarbanes–Oxley law was drafted in response to accounting scandals, such as with Enron Corporation.

In an interview on The Daily Show with Jon Stewart, Paul said he favors ending the United States Post Office legal monopoly on first class mail delivery by legalizing private competition.

Paul argued against the $700 billion bailout proposal to purchase toxic debt during the 2008 financial crisis. His vote was among the majority of "nay" votes cast to defeat the initial measure in the U.S. House of Representatives. The House passed a "sweetened" version of the bill, against which Paul voted a second time, later in the week.

== Civil liberties ==
=== Public religious expression ===
Paul believes that prayer in public schools should not be prohibited at the federal or state level, nor should it be made compulsory to engage in. He rejects the notion of "separation of Church and state", instead seeing the issue as "free exercise of religion" and "no establishment of religion". He views the latter as specific government endorsement of one particular religion, and does not see it as a mandate to ban all policies that would benefit religion in general. He argues that churches give people a moral base that government cannot provide. He views churches as more effective and more established providers of social welfare than the government. He also argues this leads to a more orderly people who have less need for the government to actively seek to control them. He opposes perceived efforts to force religion out of the public sphere.

In 2005, Paul introduced the We the People Act, which would have removed "any claim involving the laws, regulations, or policies of any State or unit of local government relating to the free exercise or establishment of religion" from the jurisdiction of federal courts. If made law, this provision would purportedly permit state, county, and local governments to decide whether to allow displays of religious text and imagery, but would not interfere with the application of relevant federal law.

Paul has sponsored a constitutional amendment which would allow students to participate in individual or group prayer in public schools, but would not allow anyone to be forced to pray against their will or allow the state to compose any type of prayer or officially sanction any prayer to be said in schools.

=== Freedom of speech ===
In 1997, Paul introduced a Constitutional amendment giving states the power to prohibit the destruction of the flag of the United States. In June 2003, he voted against a Constitutional amendment to prohibit the physical "desecration" of the flag of the United States. He believes that prohibiting flag burning is a state power, not a federal power.

==== Internet ====
He believes the Internet should be free from government regulation and taxation, and is opposed to Internet gambling restrictions and network neutrality legislation.

He was the only member of the House of Representatives to vote against an anti-spam email bill in 2000, and one of only 5 members of the entire Congress to vote against a subsequent anti-spam email bill in 2003.

Paul voted against a provision in an act that would have legally protected net neutrality.

Paul has been criticized by CNET for voting against legislation to help catch online child predators. Paul argues that parents should have the responsibility to protect their own children from such actions.

Paul was one of two representatives to vote against the Securing Adolescents From Exploitation-Online Act of 2007, which states that anyone offering an open Wi-Fi Internet connection to the public, who "obtains actual knowledge of any facts or circumstances" in relation to illegal visual media such as child pornography transferred over that connection, must register a report of their knowledge to the National Center for Missing and Exploited Children.

==== Campaign-related speech, campaign finance, and corporate personhood ====
Paul opposes federal attempts to regulate campaign spending and speech intended to influence elections. Following the passage of the McCain-Feingold campaign finance reform law, he wrote, "First, although the new campaign rules clearly violate the First amendment, they should be struck down primarily because Congress has no authority under Article I of the Constitution to regulate campaigns at all. Article II authorizes only the regulation of elections, not campaigns, because our Founders knew Congress might pass campaign laws that protect incumbency."

In 2002, he also joined with others to sue the Federal Election Commission over provisions of the McCain-Feingold law, arguing for his part that it was a violation of his First Amendment rights for the government to subject him, as a federal elected official seeking re-election, to more stringent campaign requirements, including limitations on the financial contributions he could receive from individual donors, than were placed on news media corporations that were taking positions on public policy issues relevant to campaigns.

Commenting on the Supreme Court's ruling in Citizens United, in 2010 Paul said, "You should never restrict lobbying because the Constitution is rather clear about the people being allowed to petition Congress, and whether you're an individual or you belong to a [special interest group] ... you should be allowed to do that." He argues that corporations should be able to spend their money in any way that they want. He also opposes taxpayer-funded public campaign financing.

Paul rejects the notion that corporations are people, with collective rights. He says that only individuals have rights; people are individuals, not groups or companies. "Corporations don't have rights per se, but the individual who happens to own a corporation or belong to a union does have rights, and these rights are not lost by merely acting through another organization."

==== Immunity for whistleblowers ====
At a campaign rally, Paul said that whistleblowers are "the ones who need immunity." Alluding to Daniel Ellsberg and Chelsea Manning, Paul said, "So if we have an American citizen and is willing to take the consequences and practice civil disobedience and say this is what our government's doing, should he be locked up and in prison, or should we see him as a political hero? Maybe he is a true patriot who reveals what's going on in government." However, Paul voted against the Offshore Oil and Gas Worker Whistleblower Protection Act of 2010.

=== Gun laws ===
Paul has been a lead sponsor of legislation in Congress attempting to maintain individual Second Amendment rights. He has also fought for the right of pilots to be armed.

In the first chapter of his book, Freedom Under Siege, Paul argued that the purpose of the Second Amendment is to place a check on government tyranny, not to merely grant hunting rights or allow self-defense. When asked whether individuals should be allowed to own machine guns, Paul responded, "Whether it's an automatic weapon or not is, I think, irrelevant." Paul also argues that weapons bans only keep them out of the hands of law-abiding citizens, not dangerous criminals. He sees school shootings, plane hijackings, and other such events as a result of prohibitions on self-defense. He supports the right of citizens to carry concealed weapons if they are legally owned.

==== Jury related issues ====
Paul believes that juries deserve the status of tribunals, and that jurors have the right to judge the law as well as the facts of the case. "The concept of protecting individual rights from the heavy hand of government through the common-law jury is as old as the Magna Carta. The Founding Fathers were keenly aware of this principle and incorporated it into our Constitution." He notes that this principle is also stated in Thomas Paine's Rights of Man, Supreme Court of the United States decisions by Chief Justice John Jay, and writings of Thomas Jefferson. Paul states that judges were not given the right to direct the trial by "instructing" the jury.

=== Habeas corpus ===
In the first Republican debate (2007) in California, Paul stated that he would never violate habeas corpus, through which detainees can seek relief from unlawful imprisonment. This is also a pledge in the American Freedom Agenda signed by Paul.

=== Federal legislation and civil liberty ===
==== PATRIOT Act ====
Paul broke with his party by voting against the PATRIOT Act in 2001; he also voted against its 2005 enactment. He has spoken against federal use of what he defines as torture and what he sees as an abuse of executive authority during the Iraq War to override Constitutional rights.

==== REAL ID Act ====
Paul voted against the REAL ID Act of 2005, an Act to create federal identification-card standards, which has been challenged as violating the Constitutional separation of powers doctrine, and other civil liberties. Enforcement of the Act was postponed until 2011.

==== Domestic surveillance ====
Paul has spoken against the domestic surveillance program conducted by the National Security Agency on American citizens. He believes the role of government is to protect American citizens' privacy, not violate it. He has signed the American Freedom Agenda pledge not to violate Americans' rights through domestic wiretapping and to renounce autonomous presidential signing statements, which rely on unitary executive theory. In December 2007, he stated his opposition to the US House Resolution 1955, arguing that it "focuses the weight of the US government inward toward its own citizens under the guise of protecting us against violent radicalization."

==== Conscription ====
Paul is opposed to reintroducing the draft. In 2002 he authored and introduced a resolution in the U.S. House of Representatives expressing that reinstatement of a draft would be unnecessary and detrimental to individual liberties, a resolution that was endorsed by the American Civil Liberties Union. In the 110th Congress, he has proposed a bill which would end Selective Service registration.

==== Eminent domain ====
Paul opposes eminent domain. He wishes to "stop special interests from violating property rights and literally driving families from their homes, farms and ranches". He also opposes regulatory taking.

==== Affirmative action ====
In 1997, Paul voted to end affirmative action in college admissions. Paul criticizes both racism and obsession with racial identity.

Racism is simply an ugly form of collectivism, the mindset that views humans strictly as members of groups rather than individuals. Racists believe that all individuals who share superficial physical characteristics are alike: as collectivists, racists think only in terms of groups. By encouraging Americans to adopt a group mentality, the advocates of so-called "diversity" actually perpetuate racism. Their obsession with racial group identity is inherently racist. The true antidote to racism is liberty. Liberty means having a limited, constitutional government devoted to the protection of individual rights rather than group claims. Liberty means free-market capitalism, which rewards individual achievement and competence, not skin color, gender, or ethnicity.

— Ron Paul

==== American Community Survey ====
He has called the U.S. Census Bureau's American Community Survey "both ludicrous and insulting", arguing that the information demanded is simply none of the government's business.

=== Sexual harassment ===
In his 1987 book, Freedom Under Siege, Paul expressed the view that those who experience sexual harassment in the workforce should remedy the situation by quitting their jobs. He further argued that governmental oversight is warranted only where victims are physically forced into sexual actions.

Employee rights are said to be valid when employers pressure employees into sexual activity. Why don't they quit once the so-called harassment starts? Obviously the morals of the harasser cannot be defended, but how can the harassee escape some responsibility for the problem? Seeking protection under civil rights legislation is hardly acceptable.

=== LGBT rights ===
On the specific issue of LGBT rights, Paul stated that, "You have to remember, rights don't come in groups we shouldn't have 'gay rights'; rights come as individuals, and we wouldn't have this major debate going on. It would be behavior that would count, not what person belongs to what group."

In the 2004 and 2008 House of Representatives election, he received the endorsement of the Log Cabin Republicans for reelection.

==== Employment Non-Discrimination Act ====
In a September 2007 Republican primary presidential debate, Paul answered yes to the question of whether he would veto the Employment Non-Discrimination Act, which would prohibit discrimination in hiring and employment on the basis of sexual orientation by employers with at least 15 employees. This is consistent with his views of opposing any private sector anti-discrimination laws and his belief in freedom of association.

==== Hate crimes ====
In 2007, Paul stated his opposition to the Local Law Enforcement Hate Crimes Prevention Act of 2007, which would expand the 1969 United States federal hate-crime law to include crimes motivated by a victim's actual or perceived gender, sexual orientation, gender identity, or disability, and that the reason for opposing it was he believed all hate crime laws violate the First Amendment and Tenth Amendment, although stated that hate crime legislation should be left up to individual states to decide.

In 2009, Paul voted against the Local Law Enforcement Hate Crimes Prevention Act of 2009, which would expand the 1969 United States federal hate-crime law to include crimes motivated by a victim's actual or perceived gender, sexual orientation, gender identity, or disability.

==== Gay adoption ====
In 1999, Paul voted for an amendment to HR 2587, the District Of Columbia Appropriations Act, which would have banned adoption by same-sex couples and other couples who lacked a marital or familial relationship in Washington, D.C. The amendment failed, 215–213.

==== Same-sex marriage ====
Asked his opinion on same-sex marriage in October 2011, Paul expressed his support for marriage privatization by replying, "Biblically and historically, the government was very uninvolved in marriage. I like that. I don't know why we should register our marriage to the federal government. I think it's a sacrament." In the same interview, when asked whether he would vote for or against a state constitutional amendment like California's Proposition 8, he said, "Well, I believe marriage is between one man and one woman."

Previously, in a 2007 interview, Paul had said that he supports the right of gay couples to marry, so long as they didn't "impose" their relationship on anyone else, on the grounds of supporting voluntary associations. He also said, "Matter of fact, I'd like to see all governments out of the marriage question. I don't think it's a state function, I think it's a religious function." Paul has stated that in a best case scenario, governments would enforce contracts and grant divorces but otherwise have no say in marriage. He has also said he doesn't want to interfere in the free association of two individuals in a social, sexual, and religious sense. When asked if he was supportive of gay marriage, Paul responded, "I am supportive of all voluntary associations and people can call it whatever they want."

Paul had also said that at the federal level he opposed "efforts to redefine marriage as something other than a union between one man and one woman." He believes that recognizing or legislating marriages should be left to the states and local communities, and not subjected to "judicial activism." He has said that for these reasons he would have voted for the Defense of Marriage Act, had he been in Congress in 1996. The act allows a state to refuse to recognize same-sex marriages performed in other states or countries, although a state will usually recognize marriages performed outside of its own jurisdiction. The act also prohibits the U.S. Government from recognizing same-sex marriages, even if a state recognizes the marriage.

He has opposed the Federal Marriage Amendment, which would amend the US Constitution to define marriage as the union of one man and one woman, because he worries that with its passage "liberal social engineers who wish to use federal government power to redefine marriage will be able to point to the constitutional marriage amendment as proof that the definition of marriage is indeed a federal matter! I am unwilling either to cede to federal courts the authority to redefine marriage, or to deny a state's ability to preserve the traditional definition of marriage."

Paul has been a cosponsor of the Marriage Protection Act in each Congress since the bill's original introduction. It would bar federal judges from hearing cases pertaining to the constitutionality of the Defense of Marriage Act. Speaking in support of the Marriage Protection Act in 2004, he urged those of his fellow congressional representatives who "believe Congress needs to take immediate action to protect marriage" to vote for the bill because its passage, requiring only simple majorities in both Houses of Congress, would be much more readily achieved than the passage of the Federal Marriage Amendment, which, as a Constitutional amendment, would require not only much larger majorities in both Houses but also ratification by the state legislatures.

In 2005, Paul introduced the We the People Act, which would have removed from the jurisdiction of federal courts "any claim based upon the right of privacy, including any such claim related to any issue of sexual practices, orientation, or reproduction" and "any claim based upon equal protection of the laws to the extent such claim is based upon the right to marry without regard to sex or sexual orientation." If made law, these provisions would remove sexual practices, and particularly same-sex unions, from federal jurisdiction.

In February 2011, Attorney General Eric Holder announced that the Obama administration's Justice Department had determined that a key provision of the Defense of Marriage Act was unconstitutional and, as a result, the administration would no longer argue in support of the act's constitutionality in court. Paul issued a statement to Iowa Republicans criticizing the Obama administration's position, saying: "Like the majority of Iowans, I believe that marriage is between one man and one woman and must be protected. I supported the Defense of Marriage Act, which used Congress' constitutional authority to define what other states have to recognize under the Full Faith and Credit Clause, to ensure that no state would be forced to recognize a same sex marriage license issued in another state."

==== Don't Ask, Don't Tell ====
In the third Republican debate on June 5, 2007, Paul said about the U.S. military's "Don't Ask, Don't Tell" policy:

I think the current policy is a decent policy. And the problem that we have with dealing with this subject is we see people as groups, as they belong to certain groups and that they derive their rights as belonging to groups. We don't get our rights because we're gays or women or minorities. We get our rights from our Creator as individuals. So every individual should be treated the same way. So if there is homosexual behavior in the military that is disruptive, it should be dealt with. But if there's heterosexual behavior that is disruptive, it should be dealt with. So it isn't the issue of homosexuality. It's the concept and the understanding of individual rights. If we understood that, we would not be dealing with this very important problem.

Paul elaborated his position in a 65-minute interview at Google, stating that he would not discharge openly gay troops if their behavior was not disruptive.

Ultimately, Paul voted in the affirmative for HR 5136, an amendment that leads to a full repeal of "Don't ask, Don't tell", on May 27, 2010. He subsequently voted for the Don't Ask, Don't Tell Repeal Act of 2010 on December 18, 2010.

==== Sodomy laws ====
Paul has been a critic of the Supreme Court's Lawrence v. Texas decision, in which sodomy laws were ruled unconstitutional under the Fourteenth Amendment. In an essay posted to the Lew Rockwell website, he derisively characterized sodomy laws as "ridiculous", but expressed his fear that federal courts were grossly violating their role of strictly interpreting the Constitution, and felt that they were setting a dangerous precedent of what he characterized as legislating from the bench, by declaring privacy in regards to sexual conduct a constitutional right. Paul said:

Consider the Lawrence case decided by the Supreme Court in June. The Court determined that Texas had no right to establish its own standards for private sexual conduct, because gay sodomy is somehow protected under the 14th amendment "right to privacy". Ridiculous as sodomy laws may be, there clearly is no right to privacy nor sodomy found anywhere in the Constitution. There are, however, states' rights – rights plainly affirmed in the Ninth and Tenth amendments. Under those amendments, the State of Texas has the right to decide for itself how to regulate social matters like sex, using its own local standards.

== States' powers ==
Paul's positions on civil liberties are often based on states' rights, certain rights and political powers that U.S. states possess in relation to the federal government. He cites the Tenth Amendment, "States' rights simply means the individual states should retain authority over all matters not expressly delegated to the federal government in Article I of the Constitution." For instance, the lack of federal murder statutes makes murder a state and local offense.

=== Abortion ===
Paul calls himself "strongly pro-life" and "an unshakable foe of abortion". In 2005, 2007, 2009, and 2011, Paul introduced the Sanctity of Life Act, which would have defined life as beginning at conception at the Federal level. However, he believes regulation of medical decisions about maternal or fetal health is "best handled at the state level". He believes that according to the U.S. Constitution states should, for the most part, retain jurisdiction.

Paul refers to his background as an obstetrician as being influential on his view, recalling inadvertently witnessing a late-term abortion performed by one of his instructors during his residency, "It was pretty dramatic for me to see a two-and-a-half-pound baby taken out crying and breathing and put in a bucket." During a May 15, 2007, appearance on the Fox News talk show Hannity and Colmes, Paul argued that his pro-life position was consistent with his libertarian values, asking, "If you can't protect life then how can you protect liberty?" Furthermore, Paul argued in this appearance that since he believes libertarians support non-aggression, libertarians should oppose abortion because abortion is "an act of aggression" against a fetus, which he believes is alive, human, and in possession of legal rights.

Paul has said that the Ninth and Tenth Amendments to the U.S. Constitution do not grant the federal government any authority to legalize or ban abortion, stating that "the federal government has no authority whatsoever to involve itself in the abortion issue." However, this has not stopped Paul from voting in favor of a federal ban on partial-birth abortion in 2000 and 2003.

In addition to defining human life to begin at conception at the Federal level, Paul's Sanctity of Life Act would remove challenges to prohibitions on abortion from federal court jurisdiction. In 2005, Paul also introduced the We the People Act, which would have removed "any claim based upon the right of privacy, including any such claim related to any issue of ... reproduction" from the jurisdiction of federal courts. If made law, either of these acts would allow states to prohibit abortion or any sex act. In 2005, Paul voted against restricting interstate transport of minors to get abortions.

In order to "offset the effects of Roe v. Wade", Paul voted in favor of the federal Partial-Birth Abortion Ban Act of 2003. He has described partial birth abortion as a "barbaric procedure". He also introduced H.R. 4379 that would prohibit the Supreme Court from ruling on issues relating to abortion, birth control, the definition of marriage and homosexuality and would cause the court's precedents in these areas to no longer be binding. He once said, "The best solution, of course, is not now available to us. That would be a Supreme Court that recognizes that for all criminal laws, the several states retain jurisdiction."

In May 2012, Paul was one of only seven Republicans to vote against a bill which, if passed, would have made performing or pressuring a woman into having a sex-selective abortion, or transporting a woman into the country or across state lines for the purpose of undergoing such an abortion, a federal crime, punishable by up to 5 years in prison. The bill would also have subjected nurses and other healthcare workers to fines and possible imprisonment for failing to report suspected violations of the law. Paul explained that although he found the very thought of sex-selective abortions revolting, he could not support the measure because it would be unconstitutional and would create "yet another set of federal criminal laws, even though the Constitution lists only three federal crimes: piracy, treason, and counterfeiting." He urged advocates of abortion bans to seek instead to repeal Roe v. Wade and allow abortion regulation to be handled at the state level.

=== Contraception ===
Paul says that government, especially at the federal level, should not be involved in medical matters, including contraception. He has proposed legislation to block federal funding of any family planning activity, which would include contraception; and in July 2011, when asked how he would work as president to provide contraceptive services for Americans who have no health insurance, he vowed to block all government payments for contraception: "Whether it's buying a loaf of bread or getting a birth control pill, in a free country, that's your responsibility."

Paul has asserted that a right to privacy in the Fourth Amendment to the Constitution protects the use of contraceptives and that the Interstate Commerce Clause protects the sale of contraceptives.

However, legislation which Paul has repeatedly introduced into Congress [see the We the People Act] has been criticized for potentially freeing states to ban the prescription or use of contraception, by stripping the federal courts and the Supreme Court of the authority to rule on the constitutionality of such bans.

As a firm believer that human life begins the moment an egg is fertilized, and that from that moment has a right to life that government is charged with protecting, Paul has also been challenged for simultaneously holding the apparently contradictory position of supporting access to emergency contraception, such as the morning-after pill, in cases of "honest rape." He wrote, in Liberty Defined, published in 2011, "Very early pregnancies and victims of rape can be treated with the day after pill, which is nothing more than using birth control pills in a special manner. These very early pregnancies could never be policed, regardless. Such circumstances would be dealt with by each individual making his or her own moral choice."

=== Stem-cell research ===
Paul supports stem-cell research generically, as evidenced by his authoring the Cures Can Be Found Act of 2007 (H.R. 457; H.R. 3444 in 2005), a bill "to amend the Internal Revenue Code of 1986 to provide credits against income tax for qualified stem cell research, the storage of qualified stem cells, and the donation of umbilical cord blood". However, Paul believes the debate over the embryonic category of stem-cell research is another divisive issue over which the federal government has no jurisdiction.

==== Human cloning ====
Paul joined with conservative colleagues in voting "no" on HR 2560, the Democrats' version of a federal ban on human cloning. The Bush White House had opposed HR 2560, saying "The Administration is strongly opposed to any legislation that would prohibit human cloning for reproductive purposes but permit the creation of cloned embryos or development of human embryo farms for research, which would require the destruction of nascent human life."

=== Capital punishment ===
Paul stated in August 2007 that at the state level "capital punishment is a deserving penalty for those who commit crime", but he does not believe that the federal government should use it as a penalty.

In September 2007, he elaborated:

You know over the years, I've held pretty rigid to all my beliefs but I've changed my opinion about the death penalty. For federal purposes, I no longer believe in the death penalty. I believed it has been issued unjustly. If you are rich you get away with it. If you're poor and you're from the inner city, you're more likely to be prosecuted and convicted. And today, with the DNA evidences there's been too many mistakes, so I am now opposed to the federal death penalty.

He believes that opposing capital punishment is consistent with being pro-life; in his book, Liberty Defined, stating "It's strange to me that those who champion best the rights of pre-born are generally the strongest supporters of the death penalty and preventive, that is, aggressive, war."

In August, 2013, Paul stated,

I believe that support for the death penalty is inconsistent with libertarianism and traditional conservatism. So I am pleased with Conservatives Concerned about the Death Penalty's efforts to form a coalition of libertarians and conservatives to work to end capital punishment.

=== Education ===
==== Elementary and secondary schools ====
Paul sought in the 1980s and 1990s to eventually abolish all public schools; but by the 2008 presidential election campaign, he had adopted a more moderate stance. Paul insists that "the federal government has absolutely no role in education" under the Constitution, "regardless of what the Supreme Court has claimed." He argues that the best way to improve the quality of education while fighting rising costs, growing numbers of dropouts, and higher levels of violence and drug use among students is to reduce the reach of centralized government in the schools and return control over school curricula, funding, and administration back to parents and local communities.

He has long opposed the idea of federally mandated testing being used to measure student performance against federally determined national education standards. He voted against national testing measures first proposed by the Clinton administration; and he similarly has never supported the federal No Child Left Behind Act, which he voted against when it was proposed in 2001.

Paul is a proponent of school choice, saying that private, parochial, and home schools provide a healthy counterweight to "the near monopoly control over indoctrination of young people" of the public schools, which he considers "socialist"; and he notes that the nation's Founders themselves were largely home-schooled or taught in church-associated schools. In support of school choice and local control of education, he has introduced into every Congress since 1997 measures to provide families with education tax credits. His Family Education Freedom Act would give families a tax credit of up to $5,000 per student to pay for any educational expenses whether the student attends public, private, or parochial school, or is home-schooled. His Education Improvement Tax Cut Act would provide families with an additional tax credit of up to $5,000 for donations of cash or educational materials made to schools of their choice. He has said of the latter proposal, "The Education Improvement Tax Cut Act relies on the greatest charitable force in history to improve the education of children from low-income families: the generosity of the American people. As with parental tax credits, the Education Improvement Tax Cut Act brings true accountability to education since taxpayers will only donate to schools that provide a quality education."

Although Paul supports the right of state and local school districts, under the Tenth Amendment to the Constitution, to implement education voucher plans, he rejects federal government-controlled school voucher plans, preferring federal education tax credits instead. He regards federal voucher programs as a form of "taxpayer-funded welfare" in which money is taken from middle-class families to unfairly provide private-school educations to a particular group of children favored by politicians and bureaucrats. He also worries that with federal school vouchers inevitably come further central government regulation and loss of local control over education. Private, religious schools, for instance, would feel pressured to conform to government dictates in order to become accredited by the Department of Education to qualify for participation in the voucher program. He points to how the federal government has used the threat of cutting off funding to dictate to universities which policies they must accept; he argues that the government would try to do the same with private schools.

==== College and other higher-education ====
Paul asserts that access to "education is not a right." He opposes all federal government scholarships and government loans for higher education, but is supportive of the offering of financial aid by private organizations.

In a March 2, 2011 interview, when asked whether the government should provide financial aid to a poor student with good grades who wants to further his education, Paul responded that no, the government should not because "nobody has a right to someone else's wealth. You have a right to your life and you have a right to your property but you don't have a – education isn't a right. Medical care isn't a right. These are things you have to earn." (He went on to explain that there were no government loans when he went to school, yet education costs were much lower and he was able to finance his medical school education by obtaining private loans through the medical school.)

Paul's "Restore America" budget plan, which he laid out in October 2011, calls for the immediate elimination of the Department of Education. College Pell grants and other federal financial aid programs would be transferred to another branch of government during a transition period, following which all federal financial aid for education would be eliminated.

== Environment ==
=== Privatizing federal lands ===
Paul has long held that land owned by the federal government should be sold to private parties. While campaigning in Nevada for the Republican Party presidential nomination in 2011, Paul argued that land distribution in the states should follow the model of Texas, where, he said, private owners have developed all the natural resources. In addition to closing the Department of the Interior, his "Restore America" budget plan proposes selling off at least $40 billion worth of public lands such as national parks, and other federal assets, between 2013 and 2016.

=== Free-market environmentalism ===
As a free-market environmentalist, Paul sees polluters as aggressors who should not be granted immunity from prosecution or otherwise insulated from accountability. Paul argues that enforcing private property rights through tort law would hold people and corporations accountable, and would increase the cost of polluting activities—thus decreasing pollution. He claims that environmental protection has failed due to lack of respect for private property:

The environment is better protected under private property rights ... We as property owners can't violate our neighbors' property. We can't pollute their air or their water. We can't dump our garbage on their property ... Too often, conservatives and liberals fall short on defending environmental concerns, and they resort to saying, "Well, let's turn it over to the EPA. The EPA will take care of us ... We can divvy up the permits that allow you to pollute." So I don't particularly like that method.

He believes that environmental legislation, such as emissions standards, should be handled between the states or regions concerned. "The people of Texas do not need federal regulators determining our air standards."

Paul says he opposes government assistance to private businesses intended to help shape research and investment decisions, including to promote alternative energy production and use. During a June 2011 presidential primary campaign debate, Paul said, "There shouldn't be any assistance to private enterprise. It's not morally correct, it's not legal, it's bad economics. It's not part of the Constitution. If you allow an economy to thrive, they'll decide how R&D works or where they invest their monies. But when the politicians get in and direct things, you get the malinvestment." Similarly, in an October 2011 presidential primary campaign debate, he said, "The government shouldn't be in the business of subsidizing any form of energy."

However, in 2008 Paul urged the Department of Energy to approve a federal loan guarantee to help an energy company build two new nuclear reactors in South Texas. Asked to explain the apparent contradiction between his stated opposition to federal financial involvement in private-sector business decisions and his personal intervention in the case of the nuclear company, Paul's campaign issued a statement saying, "As a Congressman and as President, Dr. Paul will work to eliminate all federal intervention in the energy market. However, until that happens, he will do his best to ensure that the money Congress appropriates is spent in the best way possible."

Paul objects to "the demand to recycle everything from paper to glass to plastic," saying that although recycling aluminum makes economic sense, "recycling for the most part consumes more energy than it saves."

=== Global warming ===
In an October 2007 interview, Paul held that climate change is not a "major problem threatening civilization", stating "I think war and financial crises and big governments marching into our homes and elimination of habeas corpus – those are immediate threats. We're about to lose our whole country and whole republic!" He declined to name any particular environmental heroes and affirmed no special environmental achievements other than his educating the people about free-market solutions rather than "government expenditures and special-interest politics".

=== Environmental-related legislative activities ===
During the 2008 presidential campaign Paul said that he had been active in the Green Scissors campaign. However, when asked by a different interviewer a few months later to discuss his Green Scissors involvement, Paul did not know what the interviewer was talking about.

Paul says that he opposes and votes against subsidies for oil and gas companies. However, unlike many others in government, industry, and the newsmedia, Paul does not include tax credits or tax deductions in his definition of subsidies. He uses the term "subsidy" only in the very narrow sense of a direct grant of money from the government to a company.

Paul voted on multiple occasions in 2007—2012 to block measures that would have eliminated or reduced tax breaks for oil and gas producers. For example, in January 2007, he voted against the Energy Independence and Security Act, which supporters said would have rescinded $14 billion in tax breaks for oil and gas drillers. In February 2008, he voted against the Renewable Energy and Energy Conservation Tax Act, which supporters said would have eliminated $18 billion in tax benefits for oil companies and substituted tax credits for wind, solar, and other renewable energy sources. In May 2008, he voted against the Energy Improvement and Extension Act, which supporters said contained provisions to cut tax breaks for oil companies and to expand tax breaks for alternative energies like solar and geothermal power, biodiesel fuels, and plug-in hybrid vehicles. In July 2010, he voted against the Consolidated Land, Energy, and Aquatic Resources Act of 2009, which would have removed federal caps on oil companies' liability for oil spills, and would have cut certain tax breaks for oil companies. In February 2011, he voted against a measure to reinstate royalties assessed for oil drilled when oil prices are high. In March, April, and May 2011, he voted against measures that would have allowed consideration of legislation to eliminate tax breaks for oil companies and promote production and use of alternative energy sources.

- In 2005, supported by Friends of the Earth, Paul cosponsored a bill preventing the U.S. from funding nuclear power plants in China.
- Paul is opposed to federal subsidies that favor certain technologies over others, such as ethanol from corn rather than sugarcane, and believes the market should decide which technologies are best and which will succeed in the end.
- In 2005, he advocated the repeal or temporary suspension of the federal gas tax in order to alleviate the economic effects of Hurricane Katrina.
- He believes that nuclear power is a clean and efficient potential alternative that could be used to power electric cars.
- He believes that states should be able to decide whether to allow production of hemp, which can be used in producing sustainable biofuels, and has introduced bills into Congress to allow states to decide this issue; North Dakota, particularly, has built an ethanol plant with the ability to process hemp as biofuel and its farmers have been lobbying for the right to grow hemp for years.
- He voted against 2004 and 2005 provisions that would shield makers from liability for MTBE, a possibly cancer-causing gasoline additive that seeped into New England groundwater. The proposal included $1.8 billion to fund cleanup and another $2 billion to fund companies' phaseout programs.

The League of Conservation Voters gave Paul a pro-environment voting-record score of 6% for 2011, and 0% for 2009–2010. (The League considers a perfect score of 100% a measure of strong support for environmental protection.) Republicans for Environmental Protection (REP), whose scorecards rate only Republican lawmakers, gave Paul a score of only 5% for 2010, and 2% for 2009–2010, on a 0 – 100% scale in which a perfect score of 100% is considered by REP to be a measure of strong support for environmental protection. Republicans for Environmental Protection rated Paul "Worst in the House" on the environment of all Republican representatives in the 111th Congress (2009–2010).

== Health policy ==
=== Health care costs ===
Paul says that contrary to what most Americans believe, access to health care is not a right, but a good whose value should be determined by the free market. In his view, government has no business in the delivery of health care. When government becomes involved, he says, costs rise and quality of care falls.

Paul calls for the eventual elimination of Medicare (federally funded health care for the elderly and disabled) and Medicaid (health care for the poor, jointly funded by the federal and state governments), and he has been a staunch opponent of the Affordable Care Act health insurance reform law that was enacted in 2010. He says that federally funded healthcare is "unconstitutional" and that the costs of the programs are unsustainable and are bankrupting the government.

Paul says that when he entered medical practice in the early 1960s, before the Medicare and Medicaid programs were established, the poor and the elderly were hospitalized at about the same rates as they have been under Medicare and Medicaid in the 2000s, and that they received good care. He says further that in those days, doctors and hospitals provided cut-rate or free care to people who did not have health insurance – "every physician understood that he or she had a responsibility toward the less fortunate, and free medical care for the poor was the norm" – and that this was possible because healthcare costs were much lower. At a church charity hospital where he worked in his early years of practice, "nobody was turned away" for lack of ability to pay.

Paul claims that government meddling in health care delivery is to blame for healthcare costs having skyrocketed over the past few decades. He recalls that in the early 1960s, patients typically paid for basic medical services with cash, as there was almost no government payment for care, and as those Americans who had private insurance were typically only covered for hospitalization and emergency care. In that setting, he says, providers almost always charged minimal fees for services in order to improve the chance of being paid. He argues that the emergence of government as a payer for healthcare services in the form of Medicare and Medicaid, along with government policies of the 1970s that led to the expansion of private insurance to cover routine medical services in addition to hospitalization and emergency care, and which required most employers to provide health insurance for their employees, interfered with the traditional physician-patient relationship. The incentive for healthcare providers and patients to keep costs as low as possible was lost. He says that now providers always charge the maximal fees for services, since the government or insurance company can be counted on to pay the bills.

Paul additionally argues that government contributes to rising healthcare costs through yet other ways, such as through government regulations, one example being restrictions imposed by the Food and Drug Administration on the manufacture and sale of medications and dietary supplements, and through licensing of physicians and other healthcare practitioners, which Paul says interferes with market-based competition for healthcare services. He also criticizes the legal system's approach to the handling of medical malpractice claims, which he says needlessly inflates the cost of healthcare further still.

=== Medical research funding ===
Paul has long opposed government funding of medical research. Although he considers himself "pro-research," he believes that "all research in a free society should be done privately."

In the mid-1980s, when no effective medication was yet available for AIDS treatment, Paul spoke publicly against all federal funding for AIDS research. He also wrote, in his book Freedom Under Siege, published in 1987, "Victims of the disease AIDS argue ... for crash research programs (to be paid for by people who don't have AIDS), demanding a cure ... The individual suffering from AIDS certainly is a victim – frequently a victim of his own lifestyle – but this same individual victimizes innocent citizens by forcing them to pay for his care. Crash research programs are hardly something, I believe, the Founding Fathers intended when they talked about equal rights."

More recently, Paul has called federal funding for medical research unconstitutional and has complained that "neither party in Washington can fathom that millions and millions of Americans simply don't want their tax dollars spent on government research of any kind ..."

He argues that the availability of federal research funds distorts "the natural market for scientific research" by inducing scientists to eschew pursuit of radical lines of potentially promising research that might not appeal to politicians and bureaucrats who hold influence over the allocation of grant monies. "Federal funding of medical research guarantees the politicization of decisions about what types of research for what diseases will be funded. Scarce tax resources are allocated according to who has the most effective lobby, rather than on the basis of need or even likely success. Federal funding also causes researchers to neglect potential treatments and cures that do not qualify for federal funds." In his view, eliminating government sources of funds for medical research would probably improve the quality of research being performed.

=== Medicare prescription drug program ===
In 2003, Paul went against the majority of Republicans and voted to block implementation of the Medicare Part D program, which expanded Medicare to cover the costs of medications for the elderly and disabled, and which prohibited the government from negotiating directly with pharmaceutical companies to try to get lower prices for the covered medications. In 2007, he again went against the majority of House Republicans when he voted with all of the Democrats in support of the Medicare Prescription Drug Price Negotiation Act, which, if enacted, would have given the government the authority to negotiate Medicare Part D drug prices with the manufacturers. During the 2012 presidential primary campaign, Paul said that although he remains opposed to Medicare Part D, repealing it was not one of his immediate priorities.

=== Tax credits for healthcare expenses and Children's Health Insurance Program ===
Paul voted in 2007 and 2009 against reauthorization and expansion of the Children's Health Insurance Program (SCHIP), which is a joint state-federal program to provide health insurance for children and pregnant women in low-income families who do not qualify for Medicaid.

He has been a consistent advocate for offering tax credits for healthcare expenses. In each Congress since 2000 Paul has proposed bills that would provide families with tax credits of up to $500 for the healthcare expenses of each dependent family member, and up to $3000 for the care of each dependent with a disability or serious disease such as cancer.

Since 2003, Paul has several times introduced into Congress proposals to provide tax credits for the cost of health insurance premiums, and to increase the allowable tax deduction for healthcare expenses (by removing the 7.5% deduction limit). He has also advocated expanding the tax benefits of health savings accounts.

=== Discrimination based on genetic predisposition to disease ===
Paul was the only member of the entire Congress to vote against the Genetic Information Nondiscrimination Act in 2008, which prohibits health insurers and employers from discriminating against an individual on the basis of carrying a gene(s) that is associated with an increased risk for developing a disease. His alternative proposal, offered in 2006, would have prohibited genetic-information-based discrimination by federal, state, and local governments or government contractors, but would also have allowed such discrimination by health insurers and other employers.

=== Emergency medical care ===
Paul opposes the federal law that requires physicians to treat all patients who go to emergency rooms seeking medical care regardless of the patient's ability to pay. He asserts that the law is unconstitutional: "The professional skills with which one earns a living are property. Therefore, the clear language of the Takings Clause of the Fifth Amendment prevents Congress from mandating that physicians and hospitals bear the entire costs of providing health care to any group." He has proposed measures that, if enacted, would shift the burden of paying for such care to the government, by providing physicians with tax credits for 100% of the cost of uncompensated care they provide under such laws, and hospitals with a 100% deduction.

=== Insurance coverage of pre-existing medical conditions ===
Paul opposes laws that require health insurance to cover pre-existing conditions. He argues that "once insurance companies are required by government to insure against preconditions, it's no longer insurance – it's a social welfare mandate and will result in bankrupting the insurance companies, or they will be bailed out by a government subsidy, further bankrupting the government. So far no one has mandated insurance companies sell fire insurance to a person whose house is on fire."

During a primary debate in the 2012 presidential election campaign, Paul was asked who would pay for the medical care of a previously healthy 30-year-old man without medical insurance who suddenly falls seriously ill and requires six months of intensive medical care. Paul said that "what he should do is whatever he wants to do, and assume responsibility for himself." When asked specifically whether the man should just be left to die, Paul then replied that he should not be left to die, but should be able to rely on the kindness of neighbors, friends, churches, and charities, as would have occurred back when Paul worked in a church charity hospital early in his career, at a time when healthcare paid for by the government was not available.

Following the debate, Paul was criticized by some political commentators for his refusal to yield in his opposition to the 2010 health insurance reform law ("Obamacare"), which prohibits insurers from denying coverage on the basis of a pre-existing condition, when it was pointed out that Paul's 2008 presidential campaign chair and friend had contracted a sudden severe illness necessitating a prolonged hospital stay before dying. He had not had any medical insurance through his employer and had been unable to purchase insurance due to a pre-existing condition. Although he had been able to receive medical care he required over the course of his illness, when he died the bills for that care amounted to about $400,000. His friends, including Paul, were able to raise about $50,000, but that still left $350,000 to be passed to his estate — or left unpaid (and passed on to other consumers and taxpayers).

=== Medical malpractice law reform ===
Paul has proposed radical changes in the way medical malpractice claims are handled. Under bills he has introduced multiple times beginning in 2003, a patient planning pregnancy, surgery, or other major medical procedures or medical treatment would be able to buy "negative outcomes" insurance at very low cost. If the patient were to experience a negative outcome in association with the medical procedure or treatment, he or she would then seek compensation through binding arbitration, rather than through a medical malpractice trial before a jury. Paul claims that "using insurance, private contracts, and binding arbitration to resolve medical disputes benefits patients, who receive full compensation in a timelier manner than under the current system," as well as physicians and hospitals, since their litigation costs, and malpractice insurance premiums, would be markedly reduced.

=== Proposal to eliminate Medicare ===
Paul proposes that all government funding of medical care be eliminated (with the exception, perhaps, of care for veterans). His Plan to Restore America budget proposal would begin a phase out of Medicare starting in 2013, when workers younger than 25 would be able to opt out of participating in the program. He says that during the transition period, the commitments for coverage under Medicare that have already been made to older workers could be honored by cutting other government spending, such as by closing all US military bases overseas and ceasing to engage in foreign military "adventurism."

=== Food and Drug Administration policy ===
Paul proposes sharply reducing the government's regulation of medications and health supplements by reducing the role of, and ultimately eliminating, the Food and Drug Administration (FDA). In a 2011 interview, Paul said, "Well, the FDA just serves the drug companies ... [and] they also prevent drugs from coming on the market [until] 10, 15 years later than other countries have it. So, yes, government just gets in the way on so many of those things." He favors allowing FDA-approved prescription drugs to be imported from foreign countries and sold at a lower cost than the same drugs otherwise sell for in the US – thereby allowing international markets to set drug prices in the US market – a practice that has been prohibited by the FDA. In the interest, as he sees it, of fighting for greater freedom of choice for consumers, he has also introduced bills that would significantly reduce the government's ability to prevent manufacturers or sellers of dietary supplements and certain other health products from making what government regulators believe to be false or misleading claims about the health effects of the products. He essentially feels that consumers should be able to buy whatever health aids they want from whomever they want, without the need for guidance by the government.

=== Physician licensure ===
Paul argues against the prevailing system of government licensure of physicians and other healthcare practitioners. In a 2007 interview, Paul accused the medical profession of choosing to maintain a strict licensing system that permits only a small number of individuals to practice in order to be able to charge much higher fees. He insisted that with a truly competitive marketplace for health services, a patient with a sore throat, for instance, would be able to be seen by a nurse more rapidly than by a medical doctor and treated by the nurse for only a fraction of the cost of what a medical doctor would charge. "Patients can sort this out. I mean, they're not going to go to the nurse if they need brain surgery. They can go there for a sore throat." He believes that patients would be best served by healthcare practitioners operating under the rules of the free market in voluntary contractual arrangements. Paul feels that anyone who claims to be a healthcare practitioner (whether of allopathic, homeopathic, or naturopathic medicine) should be able to offer healthcare services, without interference from the "nanny state."

=== Marijuana ===
Paul supports the legalization of cannabis for medical and recreational purposes. Legislation that he has cosponsored includes the States' Rights to Medical Marijuana Act and the Personal Use of Marijuana by Responsible Adults Act of 2008. In 2011, Paul and Representative Barney Frank introduced the Ending Federal Marijuana Prohibition Act to remove cannabis from the Controlled Substances Act.

=== Drug prohibition ===
Paul contends that prohibition of drugs is ineffective and advocates ending the war on drugs. "Prohibition doesn't work. Prohibition causes crime." He believes that drug abuse should be treated as a medical problem: "We treat alcoholism now as a medical problem and I, as a physician, think we should treat drug addiction as a medical problem and not as a crime." The U.S. Constitution does not enumerate or delegate to Congress the authority to ban or regulate drugs in general.

Paul believes in personal responsibility, but also sees inequity in the current application of drug enforcement laws, noting in 2000, "Many prisoners are non-violent and should be treated as patients with addictions, not as criminals. Irrational mandatory minimal sentences have caused a great deal of harm. We have non-violent drug offenders doing life sentences, and there is no room to incarcerate the rapists and murderers."

When asked about his position on implementing the Tenth Amendment, Paul explained, "Certain medical procedures and medical choices, I would allow the states to determine that. The state law should prevail not the Federal Government." Speaking specifically about Drug Enforcement Administration raids on medical marijuana clinics Paul said, "They're unconstitutional", and went on to advocate states' rights and personal choice: "You're not being compassionate by taking medical marijuana from someone who's suffering from cancer or AIDS ... People should have freedom of choice. We certainly should respect the law and the law says that states should be able to determine this."

=== Veterans' hospital access ===
Paul believes that the Veterans Administration should not be building more hospitals, and that VA hospitals should instead be phased out. He believes that government should pay to treat veterans in private hospitals, arguing they will get better care more cost-effectively.

=== Government non-intervention in medical field ===
Paul has also stated that "The government shouldn't be in the medical business." He also thinks that the talk about swine flu and getting vaccinated by the Federal Government is being blown out of proportion.

Paul, was asked a hypothetical question at a Tea Party debate by CNN host Wolf Blitzer about how society should respond if a healthy 30-year-old man who decided against buying health insurance suddenly requires intensive care for six months. Paul said it shouldn't be the government's responsibility. "That's what freedom is all about, taking your own risks," Paul said. Paul mentioned he does not believe society should let the aforementioned hypothetical man die but emphasized that churches and communities – rather than governments – should take care of those in need.

== Election law ==
=== Ballot access ===
As a former Libertarian Party candidate for President, Paul has been a proponent of ballot access law reform, and has spoken out on numerous election law reform issues.

In 2003, he introduced H. R. 1941, the Voter Freedom Act of 2003, that would have created uniform ballot access laws for independent and third political party candidates in Congressional elections. He supported this bill in a speech before Congress in 2004. In 2007 he reintroduced a similar version of the bill.

=== Voting Rights Act ===
In 2006, Paul joined 32 other members of Congress in opposing the renewal of the 1965 Voting Rights Act, originally passed to remove barriers to voting participation for minorities. Paul has indicated that he did not object to the voting rights clauses, but rather to restrictions placed on property rights by the bill. He felt the federal interference mandated by the bill was costly and unjustified because the situation for minorities voting is very different from when the bill was passed 40 years ago. Many of Texas' Republican representatives voted against the bill, because they believe it specifically singles out some Southern states, including Texas, for federal Justice Department oversight that makes it difficult for localities to change the location of a polling place or other small acts without first receiving permission from the federal government. The bill also mandated bilingual voting ballots upon request, which Paul objected to on the grounds that one of the requirements of gaining United States citizenship is ability to read in English, and that as it currently stands it often forces large expenditures to prepare materials that are in some cases never used.

=== Civil Rights Act of 1964 ===
While Paul approved the celebration of the country's progress in race relations, he said that the forced integration dictated by the Civil Rights Act of 1964 increased racial tensions and failed to achieve its stated goals. He said the Act violated the Constitution, citing abuse of the interstate commerce clause. He said the Act diminished property rights and the right to form contracts as one pleases. He said the Act led to racial hiring quotas and that these have not contributed to racial harmony, but rather encouraged racial balkanization.

=== State representation ===
Paul would like to restore State representation in Congress. During a speech in New Hampshire in February 2007 Paul called for a repeal of the Seventeenth Amendment, which replaced state election of U.S. Senators with popular election. Instead Paul would have members of state legislatures vote for U.S. Senators as they had done under Article One, Section 3. Direct popular representation would be retained in the U.S. House of Representatives. Paul believes that increased representation of state interests at the federal level encourages greater sharing of power between state and federal government.

=== Electoral College ===
In 2004, he spoke out against efforts to abolish the electoral college, stating that "Democracy, we are told, is always good. But the founders created a constitutionally limited republic precisely to protect fundamental liberties from the whims of the masses, to guard against the excesses of democracy. The electoral college likewise was created in the Constitution to guard against majority tyranny in federal elections. The President was to be elected by the states rather than the citizenry as a whole, with votes apportioned to states according to their representation in Congress."

== Foreign policy ==
Paul's views are generally attributed to those of non-interventionism, which is the belief that the United States should avoid entangling alliances with other nations, but still retain diplomacy, and avoid all wars not related to direct territorial self-defense. Paul is quoted as stating "America [should] not interfere militarily, financially, or covertly in the internal affairs of other nations", while advocating "open trade, travel, communication, and diplomacy with other nations". Ronald Reagan spoke in support of Paul's foreign policy views in the early 1980s, stating "Ron Paul is one of the outstanding leaders fighting for a stronger national defense. As a former Air Force officer, he knows well the needs of our armed forces, and he always puts them first. We need to keep him fighting for our country." Daniel Ellsberg, famous for releasing the Pentagon Papers, has said of Paul in 2010: "On foreign policy, on the Constitution, on Homeland Security, on intervention, he speaks very well." Ohio Democratic Congressman Dennis Kucinich has said that he and Paul "agree tremendously on international policy".

=== Non-intervention ===
Paul's stance on foreign policy is one of consistent non-intervention, opposing wars of aggression and entangling alliances with other nations.

Paul advocates bringing troops home from U.S. military bases in Korea, Japan, and Europe, among others. He also proposes that the U.S. stop sending what he deems massive, unaccountable foreign aid. The National Journal labeled Paul's overall foreign policies in 2010 as more conservative than 60% of the House and more liberal than 40% of the House (53% and 47%, respectively, in 2009). For 2008, his ratings were 57% more conservative and 42% more liberal (48% and 52%, respectively, in 2007).

In an October 11, 2007 interview with The Washington Post, Paul said, "There's nobody in this world that could possibly attack us today ... we could defend this country with a few good submarines. If anybody dared touch us we could wipe any country off of the face of the earth within hours. And here we are, so intimidated and so insecure and we're acting like such bullies that we have to attack third-world nations that have no military and have no weapons."

==== Afghanistan ====
Paul voted with the majority for the original Authorization for Use of Military Force Against Terrorists in Afghanistan. considering that it was a response to the September 11 attacks. But over the years even though he initially supported the War in Afghanistan, Paul also advocates withdrawing troops from Afghanistan because he believes a decade of war in Afghanistan is enough.

Paul also stated:

There really is nothing for us to win in Afghanistan. Our mission has morphed from apprehending those who attacked us, to apprehending those who threaten or dislike us for invading their country, to remaking an entire political system and even a culture ... This is an expensive, bloody, endless exercise in futility. Not everyone is willing to admit this just yet. But every second they spend in denial has real costs in lives and livelihoods ... Many of us can agree on one thing, however. Our military spending in general has grown way out of control.

==== Iraq ====
Paul was the only 2008 Republican presidential candidate who voted against the Iraq War Resolution in 2002, and he opposed the U.S. presence in Iraq, charging the government with using the war on terror to curtail civil liberties. He believes a just declaration of war after the September 11, 2001, attacks should have been directed against the actual terrorists, Al-Qaeda, rather than against Iraq, which has not been linked to the attacks. In 2003, Paul said that when America seeks war, it must be sought only to protect citizens, it must be declared by the U.S. Congress, and it must be concluded when the victory is complete as previously planned, which would allow all resources to be dedicated to victory; he added, "The American public deserves clear goals and a definite exit strategy in Iraq." However, the original authorization to invade Iraq (Public Law 107-243), passed in late 2002, authorized the president to use military force against Iraq to achieve only the following two specific objectives: "(1) defend the national security of the United States against the continuing threat posed by Iraq; and (2) enforce all relevant United Nations Security Council resolutions regarding Iraq". Accordingly, Paul introduced legislation to add a sunset clause to the original authorization.

During the 2003 invasion, Paul found himself "annoyed by the evangelicals being so supportive of pre-emptive war, which seems to contradict everything that [he] was taught as a Christian". Paul's consistent opposition to the war expanded his conservative and libertarian Republican support base to include liberal Democrats.

==== Israel ====
Paul argues that if the United States cares about Israel, the U.S. should allow them to be more independent. He states that "the surrounding Arab nations get seven times as much aid as Israel gets and also a recent study came out that showed that for every dollar you give to an Arab nation it prompts Israel to spend 1.4 dollars." Paul would not stop Israel from defending its interests in any way it saw fit.

Our foreign military aid to Israel is actually more like corporate welfare to the U.S. military industrial complex, as Israel is forced to purchase only U.S. products with the assistance. We send almost twice as much aid to other countries in the Middle East, which only insures increased militarization and the drive toward war.

We have adopted a foreign policy that has left Israel surrounded by militaristic nations while undermining Israel's sovereignty by demanding that its foreign and defense policies be essentially pre-approved in Washington. That is a bad deal for Israel, as sovereign nations must determine on their own what is a most appropriate national defense. On foreign policy as well, the U.S. steps in to prevent Israel from engaging in dialogue with nations of which the U.S. administration disapproves.

Paul was in Congress when Israel bombed Iraq's Osirak nuclear plant in 1981 and—unlike the United Nations and the Reagan administration—defended its right to do so. He says Saudi Arabia has an influence on Washington equal to Israel's. He votes against support for Israel due to his opposition to foreign aid by the US in general.

In an interview with Don Imus, Paul was asked for his view of the 2010 Gaza flotilla raid. He responded, "... I think it's absolutely wrong to prevent people that are starving and having problems, that are almost like in concentration camps, and saying yes we endorse this whole concept that we can't allow ships to go in there in a humanitarian way ..." Imus remarked, "They are allowing humanitarian aid in ... what they're concerned about is weapons falling into the hands of Hamas ..." Paul responded, "Well, they're an elected government, I mean Hamas; We have thousands of our soldiers dying to say that we want elections and we want democracy, so we finally get one in Palestine, and they elect Hamas, and then all of a sudden whoa you've elected the wrong people ..."

At the ABC News Iowa Republican Debate, Paul was asked if he agreed with Newt Gingrich's "characterization, that the Palestinians are an invented people." Paul responded, "No, I don't agree with that. And that's just stirring up trouble. And I believe in a non-interventionist foreign policy. I don't think we should get in the middle of these squabbles. But to go out of our way and say that so-and-so is not a real people? Technically and historically, yes-- you know, under the Ottoman Empire, the Palestinians didn't have a state, but neither did Israel have a state then too."

==== Iran ====
Paul rejects the "dangerous military confrontation approaching with Iran and supported by many in leadership on both sides of the aisle". He claims the current circumstances with Iran mirror those under which the Iraq War began, and has urged Congress not to authorize war with Iran. In the U.S. House of Representatives, only Paul and Dennis Kucinich voted against the Rothman-Kirk Resolution, which asks the United Nations to charge Iranian president Mahmoud Ahmadinejad with violating its genocide convention and charter. Paul was one of 12 representatives to vote against the Comprehensive Iran Sanctions, Accountability, and Divestment Act, and said, "Sanctions are literally an act of war."

==== Sudan ====
In his speech before the House on a related bill, H. Con. Res. 467, Paul rejected the proposal for "[urging] the Administration to seriously consider multilateral or even unilateral intervention to stop genocide in Darfur should the UN Security Council fail to act". Paul argued the proposal was unrelated to "the US national interest" or "the Constitutional function of [United States] military forces". The resolution passed unanimously, with Paul among 12 non-voters.

Paul was the only "no" vote on H.R. 180, the Darfur Accountability and Divestment Act of 2007 (passed House 418–1–13, not reported out of committee in the Senate), which would "require the identification of companies that conduct business operations in Sudan [and] prohibit United States Government contracts with such companies". Among the bill's findings were Colin Powell's Senate testimony that the Sudanese government and the Janjaweed militias it supported were responsible for genocide, and the observation that many Americans inadvertently invest in foreign companies which disproportionately benefit the Sudanese regime in Khartoum. Paul cited the past ineffectiveness of sanctions against Cuba and Iraq as evidence against divestment from businesses connected to the Sudanese government.

==== Cuba ====
Paul advocates ending the United States embargo against Cuba, arguing, "Americans want the freedom to travel and trade with their Cuban neighbors, as they are free to travel and trade with Vietnam and China. Those Americans who do not wish to interact with a country whose model of governance they oppose are free to boycott. The point being – it is Americans who live in a free country, and as free people we should choose whom to buy from or where to travel, not our government ... Considering the lack of success government has had in engendering friendship with Cuba, it is time for government to get out of the way and let the people reach out."

==== Ukraine and Russia ====
Following the Orange Revolution protests in 2004, which led to Viktor Yanukovych's ouster from government, Paul accused the National Endowment for Democracy of having staged a coup in Ukraine. Paul supported the 2014 Crimean status referendum, and has objected to sanctions during the Russo-Ukrainian War and foreign aid to Ukraine.

==== International organizations ====
Paul advocates withdrawing U.S. participation and funding from organizations he believes override American sovereignty, such as the United Nations, the International Criminal Court, the Law of the Sea Treaty, NATO, and the Security and Prosperity Partnership of North America.

==== The World Trade Organization ====
Paul states that the WTO is a barrier to free trade and that the economic argument for free trade should be no more complex than the moral argument.

Tariffs are taxes that penalize those who buy foreign goods. If taxes are low on imported goods, consumers benefit by being able to buy at the best price, thus saving money to buy additional goods and raise their standard of living. The competition stimulates domestic efforts and hopefully serves as an incentive to get onerous taxes and regulations reduced ... By endorsing the concept of managed world trade through the World Trade Organization, proponents acknowledge that they actually believe in order for free trade to be an economic positive, it requires compensation or a "deal".

Paul introduced HJR 90 to withdraw membership from the World Trade Organization.

=== International trade ===
Paul is a proponent of free trade and rejects protectionism, advocating "conducting open trade, travel, communication, and diplomacy with other nations". He opposes many free trade agreements (FTAs), like the North American Free Trade Agreement (NAFTA), stating that "free-trade agreements are really managed trade" and serve special interests and big business, not citizens.

He voted against the Central American Free Trade Agreement (CAFTA), holding that it increased the size of government, eroded U.S. sovereignty, and was unconstitutional. He has also voted against the Australia–U.S. FTA, the U.S.–Singapore FTA, and the U.S.–Chile FTA, and voted to withdraw from the WTO. He believes that "fast track" powers, given by Congress to the President to devise and negotiate FTAs on the country's behalf, are unconstitutional, and that Congress, rather than the executive branch, should construct FTAs.

Paul also has a 57% voting record in favor of free trade in the House of Representatives, according to the Cato Institute.

=== Borders and immigration ===
Paul considers it a "boondoggle" for the U.S. to spend much money policing other countries' borders (such as the Iraq–Syria border) while leaving its own borders porous and unpatrolled; he argues the U.S.–Mexico border can be crossed by anyone, including potential terrorists. During the Cold War, he supported Reagan's Strategic Defense Initiative, intended to replace the "strategic offense" doctrine of mutual assured destruction with strategic defense.

Paul favors legal immigration to the United States—today, approximately 1 million people per year—and opposes illegal immigration.

Paul believes illegal aliens take a toll on welfare and Social Security and would end such benefits, concerned that uncontrolled immigration makes the U.S. a magnet for illegal aliens, increases welfare payments, and exacerbates the strain on an already highly unbalanced federal budget.

Paul believes that illegal immigrants should not be given an "unfair advantage" under law. He has advocated for a "coherent immigration policy", and has spoken strongly against amnesty for illegal aliens because he believes it undermines the rule of law, grants pardons to lawbreakers, and subsidizes more illegal immigration. Paul voted for the Secure Fence Act of 2006, authorizing an additional 700 miles (1100 kilometers) of double-layered fencing between the U.S. and Mexico mainly because he wanted enforcement of the law and opposed amnesty, not because he supported the construction of a border fence.

Paul believes that mandated hospital emergency treatment for illegal aliens should be ceased and that assistance from charities should instead be sought because there should be no federal mandates on providing health care for illegal aliens.

Paul also believes children born in the U.S. to illegal aliens should not be granted automatic birthright citizenship. He has called for a new Constitutional amendment to revise Fourteenth Amendment principles and "end automatic birthright citizenship", and believes that welfare issues are directly tied to the illegal immigration problem.

=== Terrorism ===
==== Letters of marque and reprisal ====
Calling the September 11, 2001, attacks an act of "air piracy", Paul introduced the Marque and Reprisal Act of 2001. Letters of marque and reprisal, authorized by article I, section 8 of the Constitution, would have targeted specific terrorist suspects instead of invoking war against a foreign state. Paul reintroduced this legislation as the Marque and Reprisal Act of 2007. He voted with the majority for the original Authorization for Use of Military Force Against Terrorists in Afghanistan. In April 2009, following the Maersk Alabama hijacking, he proposed issuing letters of marque to combat the problem of piracy in Somalia.

==== Airport security ====
Following the 9/11 attacks, Paul "opposed the federalization of airport security, the creation of the DHS and increased police state measures, but did propose legislation that would allow airline pilots to begin carrying firearms in cockpits", on the rationale that "it's much harder for terrorists to commandeer an airplane when pilots can fight back."

==== Investigation ====
Paul supports reopening investigation into the attacks to discover why the Federal Bureau of Investigation did not act on 70 internal field tips: "We had one FBI agent, I think sent dozens and dozens of memos to his superiors saying that there are people trying to fly airplanes but not land them, and nobody would pay any attention." He also advocates investigating why the various intelligence agencies could not collaborate on information to prevent the attacks while spending $40 billion per year. He has called the 9/11 Commission Report a "charade", saying "spending more money abroad or restricting liberties at home will do nothing to deter terrorists, yet this is exactly what the 9–11 Commission recommends."

==== Rejection of 9/11 conspiracy theory ====
Paul does not believe the World Trade Center and Pentagon attacks were a government conspiracy and has explicitly denied being a 9/11 "truther", arguing that the issue is not a conspiracy but a failure of bureaucracy. He believes the 9/11 Commission Report's main goal was "to protect the government and to protect their ineptness—not ... to do this so they can use this as an excuse to spread the war ... Some who did want to spread the war would use it as an opportunity. But, it wasn't something that was deliberately done." He does not think the government would have staged such an attack. Paul has stated that he is concerned that someone might create a "contrived Gulf of Tonkin-type incident" to justify the invasion of Iran or suspend the democratic process, adding, "Let's hope I'm wrong about this one."

==== Operation to kill Osama bin Laden ====
In May 2011, Paul said he would not have ordered the raid that killed Osama bin Laden, calling the operation "absolutely not necessary". Instead he would have done it differently, stating that America should have worked with the Pakistani government who in the past had arrested Khalid Sheikh Mohammed and other terrorists who were then tried in court. Paul also stated that other alternatives were viable that were less of a violation of Pakistan's sovereignty.

==== Operation to kill Anwar al-Awlaki ====
On September 30, 2011, Paul said "If the American people accept this blindly and casually – have a precedent of an American president assassinating people who he thinks are bad. I think that's sad."

== Legislation ==
Paul has sponsored many bills in the United States House of Representatives, such as those that would abolish the income tax or the Federal Reserve. Except where indicated, all named bills below were originally authored and sponsored by Paul.

The following table contains links to the Congressional Record hosted by the Library of Congress. All the specifics and actions done for each individual bill Paul has either sponsored or cosponsored can be reviewed further there. "Original bills" and "Original amendments" indicate instances where Paul had pledged to endorse the legislation at the time the bill was initially introduced rather than at some other phase of the legislative process of the bill.

Rep. Ron Paul – U.S. House of Representatives – [R-TX-14]
Years covered	All bills sponsored	All amendments sponsored	All bills cosponsored	All amendments cosponsored	Original bills cosponsored	Original amendments cosponsored	Bill support withdrawn	Amendment support withdrawn
1997–98	32	7	223	0	76	0	0	0
1999–2000	51	8	316	0	119	0	0	0
2001–02	64	4	323	0	104	0	1	0
2003–04	68	8	354	0	150	0	0	0
2005–06	71	8	393	0	141	0	0	0
2007–08	70	0	443	0	160	0	0	0
2009–10	64	0	388	0	149	0	1	0
2011–12	48	0	256	0	116	0	0	0

Note: The numbers for the current session of Congress may no longer represent the actual numbers as they are still actively in session.

=== Foreign policy ===
==== Non-intervention ====
- Kosovo, 1999–2000: Prohibits the Department of Defense from using troops in Kosovo unless specifically authorized by law.
- Iraq Resolution declaration of war. Motion in re H.J.Res. 114, 2002-10-02. In order to prevent Congress from yielding its Constitutional authority to declare war to the executive branch, which does not Constitutionally hold that power, gives Congress the opportunity to declare war on Iraq, rather than merely "authorizing" the president to deploy forces without a declaration of war. Paul said that he would not vote for his own motion, but that if his fellow members of Congress wished to go to war in Iraq, they should follow the Constitution and declare war.
- Iran and Syria: H.Con.Res. 43, 2007-01-23. Expressing the sense of Congress that the President should implement Recommendation 9 of the Iraq Study Group Report. Urges the President to implement Recommendation 9 of the Iraq Study Group Report, recommending direct diplomatic engagement with Iran and Syria toward constructive results.
- Sunset of Public Law 107-243 Act of 2007. H.R. 2605, 2007-06-07. Establishes a sunset clause for the Authorization for Use of Military Force Against Iraq Resolution of 2002. As one of six Republicans to vote against the Iraq Resolution (which authorized military force for stated purposes without declaring war), Paul also inspired the founding of a group called the National Peace Lobby Project to promote a resolution he and Oregon representative Peter DeFazio sponsored to repeal the war authorization in February 2003. His speech, 35 "Questions That Won't Be Asked About Iraq", was translated and published in German, French, Russian, Italian, and Swiss periodicals before the Iraq War began.
- Constitutional War Powers Amendments of 2007. H.J.Res. 53, 2007-09-25 (cosponsor). Replaces the 1973 War Powers Resolution with law ensuring the "collective judgment of both the Congress and the President" in use of war powers.

==== International organizations ====
- American Sovereignty Restoration Act of 2009. H.R. 1146, 2009-02-24, originally H.R. 1146, 1997-03-20. Ends U.S. participation and membership in the United Nations and its activities.
- World Trade Organization, 1999-2000: Withdraws U.S. membership in the World Trade Organization.

The American Sovereignty Restoration Act of 2009 (ASRA) is U.S. House of Representatives bill 1146 (H.R. 1146) of the first session of the 111th Congress, "to end membership of the United States in the United Nations" (U.N.). The bill was first introduced on March 20, 1997, as H.R. 1146, to the first session of the 105th Congress (the American Sovereignty Restoration Act of 1997); it was a legislative effort to remove the U.S. from the UN. Paul reintroduced the bill on February 24, 2009

The bill was authored by Ron Paul to effect U.S. withdrawal from the United Nations. It would repeal various laws pertaining to the U.N., terminate authorization for funds to be spent on the U.N., terminate U.N. presence on U.S. property, and withdraw diplomatic immunity for U.N. employees. It would provide up to two years for the U.S. to withdraw. The Yale Law Journal cited the Act as proof that "the United States’s complaints against the United Nations have intensified."

In a letter to Majority Leader Tom DeLay of April 16, 2003, and in a speech to Congress on April 29, Paul requested the repeatedly-bottlenecked issue be voted on, because "Americans deserve to know how their representatives stand on the critical issue of American sovereignty."

It had 54 supporters in the House in its first year. It was referred to the House Committee on Foreign Affairs and was never released for a vote.

National Review cited the ASRA as an example of grassroots effort "to educate the American people about the efforts of foreign tyrants to disarm them".

On its front page, the Victoria, Texas, Advocate, a newspaper in Paul's district, expressed pride for the Act in the face of what it called several undeclared "United Nations wars".

Henry Lamb considers it "the only way to be sure that the U.S. will win the showdown at the U.N. Corral", considering that without withdrawal, U.N. claims of diplomatic immunity and Congressional subpoena power threaten each other, as in the oil-for-food scandal.

Critics say it "undoubtedly paints a bull's-eye across the entire country". Tim Wirth, president of the United Nations Foundation, finds the bill contrary to United States interests: "This piece of legislation has been brought by Ron Paul every year over the last 20 [sic] years and it never goes anywhere."

A policy review of U.S.–Canada relations describes the Act as reflecting "extreme views", but indicative of a majority pro-sovereignty view in Congress, expressed in tighter border and immigration policy, unilateralism in foreign policy, and increased national security focus.

The 2002 Republican Party of Texas platform explicitly urged passage of the ASRA; withdrawal from the U.N. had been on the platform at least since 1998.

Both houses of the Arizona legislature introduced legislation petitioning Congress to pass the ASRA (HCM 2009 in 2004, SCM 1002 in 2006); in 2007 similar legislation passed the Arizona Senate (SCM 1002 in 2007), but with the focus changed from the ASRA to Virgil Goode's Congressional resolution not to engage in a NAFTA Superhighway or a North American Union (H.Con.Res. 487, now H.Con.Res. 40).

The John Birch Society recognizes the ASRA as a reflection of its efforts since 1962 toward U.S. withdrawal.

In 2000, Tom DeWeese's American Policy Center said it delivered to Congress more than 300,000 signatures from petitions in support of the Act.

An organization calling itself the Liberty Committee also organized a nationwide petition drive asking Majority Leader Tom DeLay to schedule the bill for a vote.

==== Borders and immigration ====
- Terror Immigration Elimination Act of 2007. H.R. 3217, 2007-07-27, originally H.R. 488, 2003-01-29. Limits the issuance of student and diversity immigrant visas in relation to Saudi Arabia, countries that support terrorism, and countries not cooperating fully with United States antiterrorism efforts.
- Birthright citizenship: H.J.Res. 46, 2007-06-13, originally H.J.Res. 46, 2005-04-28. Proposing an amendment to the Constitution of the United States to deny United States citizenship to individuals born in the United States to parents who are neither United States citizens nor persons who owe permanent allegiance to the United States. Clarifies the Fourteenth Amendment in accord with Paul's opposition to birthright citizenship.
- Trans-Texas Corridor: H.R. 5191, 2008-01-29. To prohibit the use of Federal funds to carry out the highway project known as the "Trans-Texas Corridor".

==== Terrorism ====
- Police Security Protection Act. H.R. 3304, 2007-08-01, originally H.R. 1410, 1997-04-23 (Law Officer's Armor Vest Tax Credit Act of 1997). Creates tax credit for law enforcement officers who purchase armor vests.
- Anti-Terrorism Act of 2007. H.R. 3305, 2007-08-01, originally H.R. 2896, 2001-09-14. Proposed immediately after the September 11, 2001, attacks, permits pilots and navigators of aircraft, and law enforcement personnel detailed to aircraft, to carry firearms.
- Marque and Reprisal Act of 2007. H.R. 3216, 2007-07-27. To authorize the President to issue letters of marque and reprisal with respect to certain acts of air piracy upon the United States on September 11, 2001, and other similar acts of war planned for the future.

=== Economy ===
==== Taxes ====
- Tax Free Tips Act of 2009. H.R. 779, 2009-01-28, originally H.R. 4408, 1998-08-05. Provides that tips shall not be subject to income or employment taxes.
- Public Safety Tax Cut Act. H.R. 3303, 2007-08-01, originally H.R. 3124, 1999-10-21. Creates tax credit for police officers and professional firefighters, and makes public safety volunteer benefits nontaxable.
- Cost of Government Awareness Act of 2007. H.R. 3601, 2007-09-19, originally H.R. 4855, 2000-07-13. Eliminates employer withholding tax and replaces it with monthly installment payment of income tax by employees, finding that withholding taxes are inherently deceptive and unfair and that they "hide the true cost of government from taxpayers, making tax increases more feasible".
- Taxpayers' Freedom of Conscience Act of 2009. H.R. 1233, 2009-02-26, originally H.R. 1548, 2003-04-01. To prohibit any Federal official from expending any Federal funds for any population control or population planning program or any family planning activity.
- Property tax: H.R. 4293, 2007-12-05, originally H.R. 5860, 2006-07-20. Creates income tax deduction for real property taxes.
- Abolition of income tax: H.J.Res. 23, 2007-02-07. Proposing an amendment to the Constitution of the United States relative to abolishing personal income, estate, and gift taxes and prohibiting the United States Government from engaging in business in competition with its citizens. Repeals the Sixteenth Amendment, income tax, estate tax, and gift tax, and limits the government only to Constitutionally authorized enterprises. Paul had proposed similar legislation in 1999-2000 and in 2001.
- Lutetium oxide: H.R. 962, 2009-02-10, originally H.R. 3731, 2007-10-02. To suspend temporarily the duty on lutetium oxide, an ingredient in laser crystals.
- Tax Relief for Transportation Workers Act. H.R. 1097, 2009-02-13, originally H.R. 5991, 2008-05-07. To amend the Internal Revenue Code of 1986 to provide tax relief for obtaining transportation worker identification credentials.

==== Inflation ====
- Affordable Gas Price Act. H.R. 2415, 2007-05-21, originally H.R. 4004, 2005-10-06. To reduce the price of gasoline by allowing for offshore drilling, eliminating Federal obstacles to constructing refineries and providing incentives for investment in refineries, suspending Federal fuel taxes when gasoline prices reach a benchmark amount, and promoting free trade.
- Make No Cents Until It Makes Sense Act. H.R. 4127, 2007-11-08. To amend title 31, United States Code, to prohibit the further minting of 1-cent coins until the Secretary of the Treasury and the Chairman of the Board of Governors of the Federal Reserve System certify in writing that there is not a surplus of 1-cent coins already available for use in transactions, and for other purposes. The U.S. Mint currently spends $.014, which is more than the face value, for each copper-clad zinc U.S. cent it produces. Paul joked, "We can't even afford a zinc standard anymore."

==== Sound money/federal reserve ====
- Coinage Act of 1983. Called for new legal-tender gold and silver coins. Ahead of its time, this Act anticipated the successful Gold Bullion Coin Act of 1985, which led to the minting of American Gold Eagles.
- Gold standard, 1983: Attempted to reinstate the gold standard.
- Coinage legislation, 1984: Sought to require Congressional approval of any new coinage and paper money designs, and formal retention of all test notes from the Bureau of Engraving and Printing.
- Federal Reserve Board Abolition Act. H.R. 833, 2009-02-03, originally H.R. 1148, 1999-03-17. Abolishes the Federal Reserve Board and its banks and repeals the Federal Reserve Act.
- Honest Money Act. H.R. 2756, 2007-06-15, originally H.R. 2779, 2003-07-17. Repeals 31 U.S.C. 5103, the legal tender law that currently mandates acceptance of Federal Reserve notes as legal tender, in accord with hard money policy.
- Sunshine in Monetary Policy Act. H.R. 2754, 2007-06-15, originally H.R. 4892, 2006-03-07. Requires the Federal Reserve Board to continue to publish the M3 monetary aggregate on a weekly basis. The Federal Reserve ceased publishing M3 statistics as of March 23, 2006, explaining that it costs a lot to collect the data but does not provide significantly useful information.
- Free Competition in Currency Act of 2007. H.R. 4683, 2007-12-13. Strikes sections 486 and 489 of title 18, United States Code, due to "prosecutorial abuse". The Code sections effectively restrict private minting, and were cited by the FBI as justification for its November 2007 raid of Liberty Services, and its seizure of property allegedly including nearly two tons of precious metals and copper — much of which had been independently minted by Liberty Services with Paul's image. Paul commented, "If we don't do something about the dollar, the market will. I would like to legalize competition in currency."
- Tax-Free Gold Act of 2008. H.R. 5427, 2008-02-13. To provide that no tax or fee may be imposed on certain coins and bullion. Prohibits taxation on gold, silver, platinum, palladium, or rhodium bullion and transactions, and state taxation on gold and silver legal tender currencies and instruments in interstate or foreign commerce.
- Federal Reserve Transparency Act of 2009. H.R. 1207, 2009-02-26. To reform the manner in which the Board of Governors of the Federal Reserve System is audited by the Comptroller General of the United States and the manner in which such audits are reported. Ensures the audit results are available to Congress, and includes the Fed's "discount window", its funding facilities, its open market operations, and its agreements with foreign bankers. Proponents state that the Fed has never been audited by Congress since the Fed's creation in 1913. The Federal Reserve states that "the financial statements of the Federal Reserve Banks and the Board of Governors are audited annually by an independent outside auditor." Paul says that the present audit process exempts the Fed's "most crucial activities".

Significant advocacy for the Transparency Act has ensued. At a rally in Bloomington, Indiana, outside the office of Baron Hill (D-IN), a Young Americans for Liberty petition encouraging Hill to vote in favor of the bill circulated among a crowd of 200; Hill did not comment to YAL, according to member Meredith Milton. The advocacy group Campaign for Liberty (CFL) encourages members to petition representatives to cosponsor the Transparency Act, sponsoring hundreds of pro-bill rallies in cities like Boone, North Carolina; Peoria, Illinois; Philadelphia, Pennsylvania; and (CFL regional conference) St. Louis, Missouri.

Glenn Beck of Fox News mentioned the Transparency Act while discussing ways for the average person to remind Congress, "Hey, you work for me". During Beck's April 15 show from his rally at the Alamo in San Antonio, Pat Gray interviewed a local supporter of the Transparency Act, drawing cheers from the crowd. A blogger on The Motley Fool website called the bill "the first attempt at a true audit of the Federal Reserve since its inception in 1913" and affirmed Paul's Congressionally published column describing his legislation.

- Federal Reserve Sunshine Act of 2009. H.R. 1348, 2009-03-05. Requires the Federal Reserve to publish information on financial assistance provided to various entities during the bailout of 2008; creates a website listing all banks that have borrowed from the Fed since March 24, 2008, and the amount, terms, and "specific rationale" of the loans. U.S. Senate sponsor Bernie Sanders (I-VT) commented, "I have a hard time understanding how you have put $2.2 trillion at risk without making those names available." Fed chair Ben Bernanke had told Sanders that publishing the names would make the banks feel stigmatized and potentially reluctant to borrow further.

==== Social Security ====
- Social Security earnings limit repeal (cosponsor): Repealed the earnings limitation on Social Security. Seniors now continue working after retirement without being penalized.
- Social Security Beneficiary Tax Reduction Act. H.R. 161, 2009-01-06, originally H.R. 2723, 1997-10-23. Repeals the 1993 increase in taxes on Social Security benefits.
- Social Security Preservation Act of 2009. H.R. 219, 2009-01-06, originally H.R. 219, 1999-01-06, cosponsored since H.R. 857, 1997-02-27. Invests the Social Security surplus "trust funds" in marketable interest-bearing obligations and certificates of deposit, essentially insuring the integrity of the surplus.
- Senior Citizens Tax Elimination Act. H.R. 162, 2009-01-06, originally H.R. 4790, 2002-05-22, cosponsored since H.R. 761, 1999-02-12. Makes Social Security and Railroad Retirement Board payments nontaxable.
- Social Security for Americans Only Act of 2009. H.R. 160, 2009-01-06, originally H.R. 489, 2003-01-29. Limits Social Security benefits to U.S. citizens and nationals.

=== Constitutional rights ===
==== Freedom of religion ====
- Religious Freedom Amendment. H.J.Res. 78, 1997-05-08 (cosponsor). Clarifies the "right to acknowledge God according to the dictates of conscience" to include the right of prayer in public schools and other public property, and to prohibit state establishment of religion or requirements to participate in prayer.
- Hostettler amendment (Ten Commandments display): H.Amdt. 278, 2005-06-15 (voted in favor), amending H.R. 2862, 2005-06-10. Defunds the southern Indiana U.S. District Court judgment Russelburg v. Gibson County, which had directed the removal of a Ten Commandments display on the county courthouse lawn. The district judge later reversed himself, holding that the Indiana display met the Supreme Court of the United States's test described in Van Orden v. Perry, handed down two weeks after the Hostettler amendment.
- See We the People Act.

==== Freedom of association ====
- National ID (amendment): Prohibited funding for national identification numbers.
- Identity Theft Prevention Act of 2009. H.R. 220, 2009-01-06, originally H.R. 220, 1999-01-06 (Freedom and Privacy Restoration Act). Protects Social Security number confidentiality, prohibits uniform national identifying numbers, and prohibits imposition of federal identification standards.
- TV Consumer Freedom Act. H.R. 3602, 2007-09-19, originally H.R. 1078, 1999-03-11. Requires consent for signal retransmission, eliminates must-carry requirements, terminates Federal Communications Commission (FCC) mandates for television features and functions, and clarifies retransmission rights of satellite carriers.
- Freedom to Bank Act. H.R. 1419, 2009-03-10, originally H.R. 6297, 2006-09-29. Ends laws and regulations which deny decision-making opportunities and communication control to bank account holders. States in its long title that such laws "treat the American people like children".

==== Right to keep and bear arms ====
- Second Amendment Protection Act of 2007. H.R. 1096, 2007-02-15, originally H.R. 2721, 1997-10-23. Defends law-abiding citizens' Second Amendment rights to own firearms.
- National Park Second Amendment Restoration and Personal Protection Act of 2007. H.R. 1897, 2007-04-17. Prohibits firearm regulation within the National Park System. Based on 2006 legislation by Senator George Allen.
- Citizens Protection Act of 2007. H.R. 2424, 2007-05-22. Repeals the Gun-Free School Zones Act of 1990 as amended.
- See also the Anti-Terrorism Act of 2007.

==== Habeas corpus ====
- See American Freedom Agenda Act.

==== Limited government ====
- Term limits, 1970s: Paul was the first member of Congress to propose term limits legislation in the House, one of several bills considered "ahead of their time" by Texas Monthly magazine.
- Market Process Restoration Act of 1999. H.R. 1789, 1999-05-13. Repeals United States antitrust law (which limits cartels and monopolies), with intent to restore market economy benefits.
- To repeal the Military Selective Service Act. H.R. 424, 2007-01-11, originally H.R. 1597, 2001-04-26, cosponsored since H.R. 2421, 1997-09-05. Abolishes the Selective Service System, prohibits reestablishment of the draft, and forbids denial of rights due to failure to register.
- Eminent domain: attempted to prevent the Department of Housing and Urban Development from seizing a church in New York through eminent domain.
- International Criminal Court (ICC): Barred ICC jurisdiction over the U.S. military (2002 amendment).
- Global tax: Barred American participation in any U.N. "global tax" (2005 amendment).
- Surveillance: Barred surveillance on peaceful First Amendment activities by citizens (2006 amendment). Individual privacy may be an area of Paul's greatest influence, and he has long worked tirelessly against forms of what he considers to be federal snooping.
- Sunlight Rule. H.Res. 216, 2009-03-05, originally H.Res. 709, 2006-03-02. Amending the Rules of the House of Representatives to ensure that Members have a reasonable amount of time to read legislation that will be voted upon. Prohibits votes on legislation from occurring until ten days after its introduction, with the intent of giving lawmakers enough time to read bills before voting on them; allots 72 hours for House members and staff to examine the contents of amendments. Paul charged his fellow legislators with voting for the Patriot Act in 2001 without reading it first; more than 300 pages long, it was enacted into law less than 24 hours after being introduced.
- Congressional Responsibility and Accountability Act. H.R. 3302, 2007-08-01. Prohibits federal rules and regulations not enacted into law by Congress, if they result in job loss or exceed specified costs to individuals, corporations, or all persons in aggregate.
- American Freedom Agenda Act of 2007. H.R. 3835, 2007-10-15. To restore the Constitution's checks and balances and protections against government abuses as envisioned by the Founding Fathers. Proposes to "bar the use of evidence obtained through torture; require that federal intelligence gathering is conducted in accordance with the Foreign Intelligence Surveillance Act (FISA); create a mechanism for challenging presidential signing statements; repeal the Military Commissions Act, which, among other things, denies habeas corpus to certain detainees; prohibit kidnapping, detentions, and torture abroad; protect journalists who publish information received from the executive branch; and ensure that secret evidence is not used to designate individuals or organizations with a presence in the U.S. as foreign terrorists."
- See also the limited government and income tax abolition amendment.

=== Federal power ===
==== "We the People" Act ====
- We the People Act. H.R. 539, 2009-01-14, originally H.R. 3893, 2004-03-04. Forbids all federal courts from hearing cases on abortion, same-sex unions, sexual practices, and establishment of religion, unless such a case were a challenge to the Constitutionality of federal law. Makes federal court decisions on those subjects nonbinding as precedent in state courts, and forbids federal courts from spending money to enforce their judgments.

Because it forbids federal courts from adjudicating "any claim involving the laws, regulations, or policies of any State or unit of local government relating to the free exercise or establishment of religion", secularists have criticized the bill as removing federal remedy for allegations of state violation of religious freedom. As an example of potential for violation, Article 1 of the Texas Constitution provides the (currently unenforced) requirement that office-holders "acknowledge the existence of a Supreme Being". The Democratic Underground online community published the holding that the bill would give state sexual-orientation laws special immunity.

Cosponsors include Roscoe Bartlett, Tom Tancredo, Sam Johnson, Walter B. Jones Jr., John Sullivan, John Duncan Jr., and Ted Poe.

==== Abortion ====
- Sanctity of Life Act of 2007. H.R. 2597, 2007-06-06, originally H.R. 776, 2005-02-10. For the purposes of statutory construction over the jurisdictional limitation imposed, declares that "human life shall be deemed to exist from conception". Removes federal court jurisdiction over abortion cases arising from state laws and effectively negates Roe v. Wade as binding legal precedent. Such a law returns to each state the power to decide whether or not abortion should be allowed, banned, or regulated.
- See also Taxpayers' Freedom of Conscience Act of 2007.

==== Stem-cell research ====
- Cures Can Be Found Act of 2009. H.R. 1654, 2009-03-19, originally H.R. 3444, 2005-07-26. Provides tax credits for qualified stem-cell research or storage and for donation of umbilical cord blood.

==== Capital punishment ====
- Opposes federal use of capital punishment.

==== Education ====
- Teacher certification (amendment): Prohibited funding of federal teacher certification.
- Family Education Freedom Act of 2009. H.R. 1951, 2009-04-02, originally H.R. 1816, 1997-06-05. Provides tax credits to families towards spending on any type of children's education–related expenses, public, private, or homeschool.
- Education Improvement Tax Cut Act. H.R. 1952, 2009-04-02, originally H.R. 936, 1999-03-02. Applies a $5,000 tax credit per child for donations to any school in support of scholarships or academic or extracurricular programs.
- Teacher Tax Cut Act of 2009. H.R. 1949, 2009-04-02, originally H.R. 937, 1999-03-02. Provides all elementary and secondary school teachers with a $1,000 tax cut.
- Hope Plus Scholarship Act of 2009. H.R. 1953, 2009-04-02, originally H.R. 2410, 2001-06-28. Includes qualified education expenses within the Hope credit.
- Professional Educators Tax Relief Act of 2009. H.R. 1950, 2009-04-02, originally H.R. 2411, 2001-06-28. Gives all K–12 school librarians, counselors, and other personnel the same $1,000 tax credit as the Teacher Tax Cut Act.
- Make College Affordable Act of 2009. H.R. 1954, 2009-04-02, originally H.R. 401, 2005-01-26, cosponsored since H.R. 1631, 1999-04-29. Creates full tax deduction for higher education expenses and interest on student loans.
- Education Professional Development Tax Credit Act of 2007. H.R. 4078, 2007-11-05. To amend the Internal Revenue Code of 1986 to allow elementary and secondary school teachers a credit against income tax for professional development and training expenses.

==== Sexual orientation legislation ====
- Marriage Protection Act of 2007. H.R. 724, 2007-01-30, originally H.R. 3313, 2003-10-16 (cosponsor). To limit Federal court jurisdiction over questions under the Defense of Marriage Act. Explicitly permits states to continue making a public-policy exception when deciding the status of same-sex relationships independently of the decisions of other states, as states have in fact been permitted to do in the case of incestuous marriages.

==== Environment ====
- A bill to repeal the Soil and Water Conservation Act of 1977. H.R. 7079, 1980-04-16.
- Dredging: H.R. 7245, 1980-05-01. Amends the Federal Water Pollution Control Act to remove federal jurisdiction from dumping in private (non-navigable) waters, and from state dumping permit programs; permits applicants, rather than the Secretary of the Army, to specify disposal sites when requesting permission to discharge dredged or fill material into interstate navigable waters.
- Fisheries: H.R. 3735, 1998-04-28. To disapprove a rule requiring the use of bycatch reduction devices in the shrimp fishery of the Gulf of Mexico. Annuls federal mandates that require private fisheries to reduce catches of non-targeted species at their own cost.
- Environmental Protection Agency: H.J.Res. 104, 2000-07-13. Disapproves an EPA rule published on 2000-07-13, relating to proposed revisions to its pollutant discharge reduction program, federal antidegradation policy, and water quality planning and management regulations.
- Lake Texana dam: Transferred ownership of the Lake Texana dam project from the federal government to Texas.
- San Jacinto disposal area: H.R. 4829, 2007-12-18. To authorize the Secretary of the Army to convey the surface estate of the San Jacinto Disposal Area to the city of Galveston, Texas.
- To provide for the transfer of certain Federal Property to the Galveston Historical Foundation. H.R. 2121, 2009-04-27, originally H.R. 6440, 2008-07-08.
- Energy Efficient and Environmentally Friendly Automobile Tax Credit Act of 2009. H.R. 1768, 2009-03-26, originally H.R. 6441, 2008-07-08.

=== Health ===
==== Health reform ====
- Quality Health Care Coalition Act of 2009. H.R. 1493, 2009-03-12, originally H.R. 1247, 2003-03-12. Exempts health care professionals from antitrust laws in their negotiations with health plans and health insurance issuers.
- Comprehensive Health Care Reform Act of 2009. H.R. 1495, 2009-03-12, originally H.R. 1287, 2003-03-13. Strengthens health savings accounts and credit for health care costs, carries forward unused health benefits, and repeals threshold on medical expenses deduction.
- Seniors' Health Care Freedom Act of 2009. H.R. 164, 2009-01-06, originally H.R. 580, 2005-02-02, cosponsored since H.R. 2867, 1999-09-14. Facilitates private contracts under Medicare.
- Nursing Home Emergency Assistance Act. H.R. 1494, 2009-03-12, originally H.R. 4002, 2005-10-06.
- Treat Physicians Fairly Act of 2009. H.R. 1497, 2009-03-12, originally H.R. 4872, 2006-03-02. Creates tax credit to medical care providers against income tax for uncompensated emergency medical care, and deduction to hospitals for such care.
- Enhanced Options for Rural Health Care Act of 2007. H.R. 1899, 2007-04-17, originally H.R. 6154, 2006-09-21. Gives specific permission for rural health facilities designated as critical access hospitals to offer assisted living services without losing their designation.

==== Tax cuts ====
- Prescription Drug Affordability Act. H.R. 163, 2009-01-06, originally H.R. 3636, 2000-02-10 (Pharmaceutical Freedom Act). Creates prescription drug tax credit and facilitates import and Internet sale of such drugs.
- Cancer and Terminal Illness Patient Health Care Act. H.R. 4684, 2007-12-13, originally H.R. 4265, 2000-04-13. Assists those suffering from cancer and other life-threatening illnesses by waiving the employee portion of Social Security taxes.
- Child Health Care Affordability Act. H.R. 1496, 2009-03-12, originally H.R. 4799, 2000-06-29 (Family Health Tax Cut Act). Creates income tax credit for medical expenses for dependents.
- Freedom From Unnecessary Litigation Act of 2009. H.R. 1498, 2009-03-12, originally H.R. 1249, 2003-03-12. Creates tax credit for the cost of insurance against negative outcomes from surgery, such as against malpractice of a physician.
- Evacuees Tax Relief Act of 2008. H.R. 7055, 2008-09-24, originally H.R. 4066, 2005-10-17.
- Phosphoric acid: H.R. 961, 2009-02-10, originally H.R. 3732, 2007-10-02. To suspend temporarily the duty on phosphoric acid, lanthanum salt, cerium terbium-doped, compounds which have medical uses.

==== Alternative Health ====
- Medical Marijuana Patient Protection Act. H.R. 5842, 2008-04-17, cosponsored since H.R. 2592, 2001-07-23 (States' Rights to Medical Marijuana Act). Protects authorized medical marijuana patients and protects state-legal farmers against federal raids. Lets states choose their own stances on medical marijuana regulations, and permits further study, regulation, and use by reclassifying the plant medically.
- Parental Consent Act of 2007. H.R. 2387, 2007-05-17, originally H.R. 5236, 2004-10-06 (Let Parents Raise Their Kids Act). To prohibit the use of Federal funds for any universal or mandatory mental health screening program.
- Health Freedom Protection Act. H.R. 2117, 2007-05-02, originally H.R. 4282, 2005-11-09. Amends the Federal Food, Drug, and Cosmetic Act regarding health claims of foods and dietary supplements. Authorizes specific health claims to be made about saw palmetto, omega-3 fatty acids, glucosamine, chondroitin sulfate, and calcium. Establishes government burden of proof in false advertising cases.
- Act to Remove Federal Penalties for the Personal Use of Marijuana by Responsible Adults. H.R. 5843, 2008-04-17 (cosponsor).

=== Agriculture ===
- Ag and rural legislation: Cofounded Congressional Rural Caucus, a bipartisan group which promotes legislation to help the agriculture industry and rural communities.
- Agriculture Education Freedom Act. H.R. 1955, 2009-04-02, originally H.R. 3626, 1998-04-01. Makes nontaxable the sale of animals raised and sold as part of an educational program.
- Industrial Hemp Farming Act of 2009. H.R. 1866, 2009-04-02, originally H.R. 3037, 2005-06-22. Excludes industrial hemp from the definition of marihuana for Controlled Substances Act purposes, thereby giving the states the power to regulate and permit farming of hemp. The measure would be a first since the national prohibition of industrial hemp farming in the United States. Paul joined prominent liberal Democrats in urging this proposal. He contends that it would help North Dakota and other agriculture states, where farmers have requested the ability to farm hemp for years. The Economist wrote that his support for hemp farming could appeal to farmers in Iowa.
- Seafood: H.Con.Res. 125, 2007-04-23 (cosponsor). Recognizing the health benefits of eating seafood as part of a balanced diet, and supporting the goals and ideals of National Seafood Month.
- Unpasteurized milk: H.R. 778, 2009-01-28, originally H.R. 4077, 2007-11-05. To authorize the interstate traffic of unpasteurized milk and milk products that are packaged for direct human consumption between states permitting its sale.

=== Ballot access ===
- Voter Freedom Act of 2007. H.R. 3600, 2007-09-19, originally H.R. 2477, 1997-09-16. Establishes the right of ballot access for candidates with timely petitions containing 1,000 signatures.

== See also ==
- Classical liberalism
- Monetary policy of the United States
- Paleolibertarianism
- Right-libertarianism
- Treasury bills
- Usury
