= Human Life Amendment =

Proposed U.S. Constitutional amendments to restrict or abolish the right to abortion

The Human Life Amendment is the name of multiple proposals to amend the United States Constitution that would have the effect of overturning the Supreme Court 1973 decision Roe v. Wade, which ruled that prohibitions against abortion were unconstitutional. All of these amendment proposals seek to overturn Roe v. Wade, but most of them go further by forbidding both Congress and the states from legalizing abortion. Some of the proposals define human life as beginning with conception or fertilization.

These amendments are sponsored or supported by United States anti-abortion movements and opposed by the United States abortion rights movement. As of August 2022, none of these proposals have succeeded though Roe v. Wade was overturned in full by the Supreme Court in Dobbs v. Jackson Women's Health Organization in 2022.

== History of the Human Life Amendment ==
A number of Human Life Amendments have been proposed in Congress since 1973, with 20 total days of hearings before the Senate Judiciary Committee in 1974, 1975, and 1981, several other hearings before other committees, and a number of floor debates. Between 1973 and 2003, the National Committee for a Human Life Amendment reports a total of 330 proposals using varying texts, with most dying in committee. The only version of the Human Life Amendment to reach a formal floor vote was the Hatch-Eagleton Amendment, which received 49 supporting votes in the Senate on June 28, 1983, falling 18 votes short of the 67 required for passage.

=== The Hogan Amendment ===
Introduced by Rep. Lawrence Hogan (R-MD) on January 30, 1973, under H.J.Res. 261.

Section 1. Neither the United States nor any State shall deprive any human being, from the moment of conception, of life without due process of law; nor deny to any human being, from the moment of conception, within its jurisdiction, the equal protection of the laws.

Section 2. Neither the United States nor any State shall deprive any human being of life on account of illness, age, or incapacity.

Section 3. Congress and the several States shall have the power to enforce this article by appropriate legislation.

=== The Whitehurst Amendment ===
Introduced by Rep. G. William Whitehurst (R-VA) on March 13, 1973, under H.J.Res. 427.

Section 1. Nothing in this Constitution shall bar any State or territory or the District of Columbia, with regard to any area over which it has jurisdiction, from allowing, regulating, or prohibiting the practice of abortion.

=== The Burke Amendment ===
Introduced by James Burke (D-MA) on September 12, 1973, under H.J.Res. 769.

Section 1. With respect to the right to life, the word 'person,' as used in this article and in the fifth and fourteenth articles of amendment to the Constitution of the United States, applies to all human beings, including their unborn offspring at every stage of their biological development, irrespective of age, health, function, or condition of dependency.

Section 2. No abortion shall be performed by any person except under and in conformance with law permitting an abortion to be performed only in an emergency when a reasonable medical certainty exists that the continuation of pregnancy will cause the death of the mother and requiring that person to make every reasonable effort, in keeping with good medical practice, to preserve the life of her unborn offspring.

Section 3. The Congress and the several States shall have power to enforce this article by appropriate legislation within their respective jurisdictions.

=== Scott Amendment ===
Introduced by Sen. William Scott (R-VA) on June 6, 1975, under S.J.Res. 91.

The power to regulate the circumstances under which pregnancy may be terminated is reserved to the states.

=== The Paramount Amendment ===
Introduced by Rep. Romano Mazzoli (D-KY) on April 5, 1979, under H.J.Res. 294.

The paramount right to life is vested in each human being from the moment of fertilization without regard to age, health, or condition of dependency.

=== Hatch Amendment ===
Introduced by Sen. Orrin Hatch (R-UT) on September 21, 1981, under S.J.Res. 110.

A right to abortion is not secured by this Constitution. The Congress and the several States shall have the concurrent power to restrict and prohibit abortions: Provided, That a law of a State which is more restrictive than a law of Congress shall govern.

=== The Hatch-Eagleton Amendment ===
Introduced by Sen. Orrin Hatch and Sen. Thomas Eagleton (D-MO) on January 26, 1983, under S.J.Res. 3, and referred to the Committee on the Judiciary. The matter was referred to the Subcommittee on Constitution on February 22, and hearings were held by the subcommittee on Feb 28 and March 7. On March 23, the Subcommittee "[a]pproved for full committee consideration with an amendment favorably". The Committee itself ordered the resolution to be reported with amendment without recommendation on April 19, and the resolution was reported to the Senate and placed on the legislative calendar on July 7. The resolution finally came before the full Senate on June 27 and 28, failing passage by a 49-50 vote.

== See also ==
- Sanctity of Life Act
