= Marriage Protection Act =

Marriage Protection Act of 2004
- Long title: An Act to amend title 28, United States Code, to limit Federal court jurisdiction over questions under the Defense of Marriage Act.

Codification
- Titles amended: 28: Judiciary and Judicial Procedure
- U.S.C. sections amended: Chapter 99 § 1632

Legislative history
- Introduced in the House as H.R. 3313 by John Hostettler (R–IN) on October 16, 2003; Passed the House on July 22, 2004 (233-194)

The Marriage Protection Act of 2004 (MPA) was a bill introduced in the United States Congress in 2003 to amend the federal judicial code to deny federal courts jurisdiction to hear or decide any question pertaining to the interpretation of the Defense of Marriage Act (DOMA) or the MPA itself. Introduced as H.R. 3313 during the 108th Congress, the Republican-controlled House passed it in 2004, but it did not pass the Senate.

== Text ==
The version approved by the House of Representatives would have added this text as Section 1632 to Chapter 99 in Part IV of Title 28 of the United States Code (28 U.S.C. § 1632), governing the judiciary and judicial procedures:

No court created by Act of Congress shall have any jurisdiction, and the Supreme Court shall have no appellate jurisdiction, to hear or decide any question pertaining to the interpretation of, or the validity under the Constitution of, section 1738C or this section.

28 U.S.C. § 1738C forbade (prior to the Respect for Marriage Act) requiring any state or any other political subdivision of the United States to credit as a marriage a same-sex relationship treated as marriage in another state or equivalent government.

== Major actions ==
On October 16, 2003, the bill was introduced in the House of Representatives by John Hostettler (R–Indiana) and immediately referred to the House Committee on the Judiciary. The bill was co-sponsored by Ron Paul of Texas (R–Texas). The legislation passed the House by a vote of 233 to 194. The Senate referred the bill to the Senate Judiciary Committee on September 7, 2004, where it died in committee. Hostettler reintroduced the legislation as H.R. 1100 in the 109th Congress on March 3, 2005. It had 76 co-sponsors. It again died in committee. Dan Burton (R–Indiana) reintroduced the legislation as H.R. 724 in the 110th United States Congress, on January 30, 2007, with 50 cosponsors. It died when the 110th Congress ended. Burton reintroduced it again in the 111th Congress on March 3, 2009, as H.R. 1269 and it died in committee. Dan Burton reintroduced it in the 112th Congress on March 2, 2011, as H.R. 875 with 26 cosponsors. It was referred to the Subcommittee on Courts, Commercial and Administrative Law and the Subcommittee on Constitution.

== Analysis ==
The proposed legislation raises Constitutional questions in relation to the Full Faith and Credit Clause. Joanna Grossman, writing for FindLaw, emphasized "the need for the federal courts to weigh in", rather than for states to continue making a public-policy exception when deciding the status of same-sex relationships independently of the decisions of other states, as states have been permitted to do in the case of incestuous marriages. The Act was designed to protect DOMA by prohibiting federal courts from hearing cases like that of Nancy Wilson, who sued to have her relationship with Paula Schoenwether treated as marriage in Florida because it had been treated as marriage in Massachusetts. In that case, the federal court upheld DOMA.

The U.S. Constitution permits Congress to make exceptions to court jurisdiction. The degree to which such exceptions may undermine federal separation of powers, the Equal Protection Clause, or the Due Process Clause, may render the Marriage Protection Act unconstitutional, according to Grossman.

== See also ==
- Jurisdiction stripping
- Federal Marriage Amendment
- Defense of Marriage Act (1996)
- LGBT rights in the United States
- We the People Act
- Respect for Marriage Act (2022)
