= Medical Marijuana Patient Protection Act of 2008 =

The Medical Marijuana Patient Protection Act of 2008, also known as H.R. 5842, was a bill repeatedly introduced in the United States House of Representatives since 2001, most recently on April 17, 2008, by Ron Paul, M.D. (R-TX), Barney Frank (D-MA), Dana Rohrabacher (R-CA), Maurice Hinchey (D-NY), and Sam Farr (D-CA). It seeks to enact legal protections for authorized medical marijuana patients, in the House of Representatives. It was introduced along with HR 5843, or Personal Use of Marijuana by Responsible Adults Act of 2008.

Currently, 13 states—Alaska, California, Colorado, Hawaii, Maine, Michigan, Montana, Nevada, New Mexico, Oregon, Rhode Island, Vermont and Washington—have enacted laws protecting medical marijuana patients from state prosecution, but they are not recognized federally, and, thus, federal raids are still possible on state-legal institutions of cannabis growing and distribution. Due to Gonzales v. Raich, federal agents may intervene even when the cannabis does not cross state boundaries.

It does not change current federal regulations on recreational use, but simply lets states choose their own stance on medical marijuana regulations, as well as opening the door for further study, regulation, and use by reclassifying the plant medically.
