= Family Education Freedom Act =

The Family Education Freedom Act is a bill initially introduced in the United States House of Representatives by Representative Ron Paul (R-TX) in 1998. It would allow tax credits for education expenses.

On February 15, 2007, Rep. Paul introduced the Act again in the House, this time with an initial three co-sponsors, Tom Feeney (R-FL), Bobby Rush (D-IL), and Jim Sensenbrenner (R-WI). The bill was designated H.R. 1056 and was referred to the Ways and Means Committee. The bill has since gained three more co-sponsors, Roscoe Bartlett (R-MD), Patrick McHenry (R-NC), and Jeff Miller (R-FL).

== Summary of bill ==
The bill says that it will "amend the Internal Revenue Code of 1986 to allow individuals a credit against income tax for tuition and related expenses for public and nonpublic elementary and secondary education." The tax credit was originally $3,000 in past versions of the bill, and in 2007 the proposed tax credit was increased to $5,000 per child in school.

While the tax credit could be used to pay private school tuition, it could also be used for any school-related expenses for those whose children attend public school or donate to extracurricular activities or for those whose child attends home school. Qualified expenses would include tuition or fees, a personal computer, books, supplies, or transportation.

== History ==
Paul noted when introducing the bill originally that the state of Arizona had introduced similar tax credits, and the state found that it had increased resources available for education as a result. He said, "The Arizona experience is further proof that putting control of education resources into the hands of the American people through education tax credits is the best way to improve education. Tax credits allow parents and other concerned citizens to devote more of their resources to education, and allow the American people to work with educators to ensure that all children have the opportunity to receive a quality education that suits each child's unique needs."

The bill has been introduced in what Congressman Paul has described as the "Education Freedom Package," along with the Education Improvement Tax Cut Act, which would allow a $3,000 credit for donations to schools or scholarship programs, and the Teacher Tax Cut Act, which would allow a $1,000 tax deduction to be taken by all teachers.

The bill has been referred to as "pro-homeschool," and the Home School Legal Defense Association has "strongly lobbied" for and endorsed the bill in 2003, 2001 and as far back as 1997. In 1999, the Minnesota Libertarian Party announced plans to pass a Minnesota version of the bill as part of an announced legislative agenda.

As part of his 2008 presidential campaign, Paul said that if elected President, he would pass the Family Education Freedom Act.

== Past versions ==
Paul introduced this bill in other versions in other sessions of Congress.

- 105th Congress: H.R. 1816
- 106th Congress: H.R. 935
- 107th Congress: H.R. 368 (2001) Introduced January 31, 2001

This version was co-sponsored by Bartlett, Charlie Norwood (R-GA), and Bob Schaffer (R-CO).

- 108th Congress: H.R. 612 (2003) Introduced February 5, 2003, referred to Ways and Means
- 109th Congress: H.R. 406 (2005)

This version was initially co-sponsored by Bartlett, Tom Tancredo (R-CO), Sensenbrenner, Marilyn Musgrave (R-CO), and Mario Díaz-Balart (R-FL) and eventually gained 10 co-sponsors. The bill was referred to the Committee on Ways and Means.
