= American Freedom Agenda =

Former political advocacy organization

Logo of the American Freedom Agenda.

The American Freedom Agenda (AFA) was a United States organization established in 2007 by disaffected libertarian-oriented conservatives demanding that the Republican Party return to its traditional mistrust of concentrated government power. It described itself as "a coalition established to restore checks and balances and civil liberties protections under assault by the executive branch." It was founded by Bruce Fein (chairman), Bob Barr, David Keene and Richard Viguerie.

The ten points of the American Freedom Agenda pledge were:

- No military commissions except on the battlefield.
- No evidence extracted by torture or coercion.
- No detaining citizens as unlawful enemy combatants.
- Restoring habeas corpus for suspected alien enemy combatants.
- Prohibiting warrantless spying by the National Security Agency in violation of law.
- Renouncing presidential signing statements.
- Ending secret government by invoking State Secrets Privilege.
- Stopping extraordinary rendition by the United States by the U.S.
- Stopping threats to prosecuting journalists under the Espionage Act of 1917.
- Ending the listing of individuals or organizations as terrorists based on secret evidence.

== Timeline ==
On March 20, 2007, Ron Paul became the first presidential candidate to sign the American Freedom Agenda Pledge. The group labeled presidential candidate Mitt Romney "unfit to serve as president" when he failed to sign the pledge. Steve Kubby, a former candidate for the Libertarian Party nomination for president, also signed the pledge.

On October 15, 2007, Paul introduced legislation, the "American Freedom Agenda Act of 2007" (H.R. 3835) before Congress, which sought to legislate the aims of the American Freedom Agenda. The measure, which was co-sponsored by Congressmen Dennis Kucinich (D-Ohio) and Peter Welch (D-Vermont), was referred to several House committees but never received a floor vote.
