= Sanctity of Life Act =

The proposed Sanctity of Life Act was a bill first introduced in the United States House of Representatives by Rep. Steve Stockman (R-TX) on July 20, 1995, and co-sponsored by Rep. Barbara Cubin (R-WY). It was reintroduced with similar text by Rep. Ron Paul (R-TX) in 2005 in the 109th United States Congress, 110th United States Congress, 111th United States Congress, and the 112th United States Congress. The repeatedly introduced bill sparked advocacy from anti-abortion activists and opposition from abortion-rights activists. The bill has never become law.

== Summary ==
=== Findings ===
The proposed Sanctity of Life Act would have defined human life and legal personhood (specifically, natural personhood) as beginning at conception, "without regard to race, sex, age, health, defect, or condition of dependency." By contrast, the Born-Alive Infants Protection Act of 2002 amended 1 U.S.C. § 8 to provide that legal personhood includes all Homo sapiens who are "born alive".

Section 2(b)(2) of the bill further would have recognized that each state has the authority to protect the lives of unborn children residing in the jurisdiction of that state. Such legislative declarations are nonbinding statements of policy and are used by federal courts in the context of determining the intent of the legislature in legal challenges.

=== Provisions ===
The bill would have amended the federal judicial code to remove Supreme Court and district court jurisdiction to review cases arising out of any statute, ordinance, rule, regulation, or practice, or any act interpreting such a measure, because such measure: (1) protects the rights of human persons between conception and birth; or (2) prohibits, limits, or regulates the performance of abortions or the provision of public funds, facilities, personnel, or other assistance for abortions.

== Legislative history ==
The Stockman bill, H.R. 2087, was introduced on July 20, 1995, and immediately referred to the House Committee on the Judiciary. It was then referred to the Subcommittee on the Constitution, Civil Rights, and Civil Liberties on July 28, 1995.

The first Paul bill, H.R. 776, was introduced on February 10, 2005, and again referred to the Judiciary Committee, which referred it to the Subcommittee on Courts, the Internet, and Intellectual Property on April 4, 2005. It had five cosponsors.

On February 15, 2007, Paul reintroduced the Act in the 110th Congress, with four cosponsors; he reintroduced another version with the same name on June 6, 2007, with five cosponsors. The bills, H.R. 1094 and H.R. 2597, were referred to the Judiciary committee. The committee referred the first bill to the Subcommittee on the Constitution on March 19, 2007, and the second bill to the Subcommittee on Courts on July 16, 2007; both bills expired in the subcommittee. In 2009, Paul reintroduced another version of the bill H.R. 2533 with one cosponsor.

Ron Paul introduced it again in March 2011, as H.R. 1096, for the 112th Congress (2011-2012).

== Anti-abortion advocacy ==
Paul's reintroduction of the bill was introduced the same year as the proposed We the People Act, which would have removed “any claim based upon the right of privacy, including any such claim related to any issue of ... reproduction” from federal court jurisdiction. Neither bill passed the 109th Congress. Paul spoke passionately about his anti-abortion position, which includes his introduction of the Sanctity of Life Act, while campaigning for U.S. president in 2007, such as in Lawton, Iowa. In 2011 and 2012, Ron Paul pointed to the Sanctity of Life Act to demonstrate his opposition to abortion rights. Paul Dorr of nearby Ocheyedan became Paul's Iowa campaign field coordinator because of Paul's strong anti-abortion stance, stating that, unlike other Republicans, Paul does not abandon his position while in office; Paul's sponsorship of the Sanctity of Life Act was immediately cited.

When Paul mentioned the legislation in a personal "Statement of Faith", CBN News White House correspondent David Brody noted that Paul was an exception to the pattern of the 2008 Republican candidates for president not engaging in "God talk". The California Catholic Daily also cited Paul as "abortion's 'unshakeable foe'" with the Act as evidence.

On January 22, 2008, the 35th anniversary of Roe v. Wade, Norma McCorvey ("Jane Roe"), then an anti-abortion activist, endorsed Paul for president based on his authorship of the Sanctity of Life Act and the We the People Act.
