= Personal Use of Marijuana by Responsible Adults Act of 2008 =

The Personal Use of Marijuana by Responsible Adults Act of 2008 was a bill in the United States House of Representatives introduced by Barney Frank (D-MA) in the 110th congress on April 17, 2008 as H.R. 5843. The bill had a total of 8 cosponsors. Its passage would have eliminated federal criminal penalties for possession of up to 100 grams (3.5 oz) and nonprofit transfer of up to an ounce of cannabis under the Controlled Substances Act. It does not change the regulation on the manufacturing or the sale of cannabis. It is the first bill of its kind to be introduced at the federal level in the U.S. since 1984.

The bill incorporates the basic recommendations of the National Commission on Marijuana and Drug Abuse (also known as the Shafer Commission). The commission published its findings in 1972 and recommended that then-president Richard Nixon decriminalize possession of marijuana in amounts that constituted "simple possession."

The National Organization for the Reform of Marijuana Laws (NORML), the Marijuana Policy Project (MPP), and the Drug Policy Alliance (DPA) had a large hand in the formation of bill, working closely with Rep. Frank. The bill also as mentioned earlier relied heavily also on information and advice from the federally funded National Commission on Marijuana and Drug Abuse.

Rep. Frank says that it's time "for the politicians to catch up with the public on this. The notion that you lock people up for smoking marijuana is pretty silly."

The bill died in committee as it was not passed through the House committee prior to the end of the 110th Congress. It has been re-introduced in the 111th Congress as H.R. 2943, the Personal Use of Marijuana by Responsible Adults Act of 2009 with ten cosponsors.

== Supporters ==
=== People ===
- Barney Frank, J.D. (D-MA) U.S. Representative, bill sponsor
- Ron Paul, M.D. (R-TX), U.S. Representative, bill cosponsor
- Barbara Lee, M.S.W., (D-CA), U.S. Representative
- Tammy Baldwin, J.D., (D-WI), U.S. Representative, bill cosponsor
- William Lacy Clay, Jr., (D-MO), U.S. Representative
- Earl Blumenauer, J.D., (D-OR), U.S. Representative, bill cosponsor
- Pete Stark, M.B.A., (D-CA), U.S. Representative, bill cosponsor
- Zoe Lofgren, J.D., (D-CA), U.S. Representative, bill cosponsor
- Jim McDermott, M.D., (D-WA), U.S. Representative, bill cosponsor

=== Organizations ===
- Congressional Black Caucus
- Drug Policy Alliance (DPA)
- Marijuana Policy Project (MPP)
- NORML

== Opponents ==
- Office of National Drug Control Policy (ONDCP) David Murray

== See also ==
- Personal Use of Marijuana by Responsible Adults Act of 2009
- Massachusetts Sensible Marijuana Policy Initiative
- Adult lifetime cannabis use by country
- Annual cannabis use by country
- Decriminalization of non-medical marijuana in the United States
- Health issues and the effects of cannabis
- Illegal drug trade
- Legal and medical status of cannabis
- Legality of cannabis by country
- Removal of cannabis from Schedule I of the Controlled Substances Act
- Single Convention on Narcotic Drugs
