= Telefónica SA v Commission =

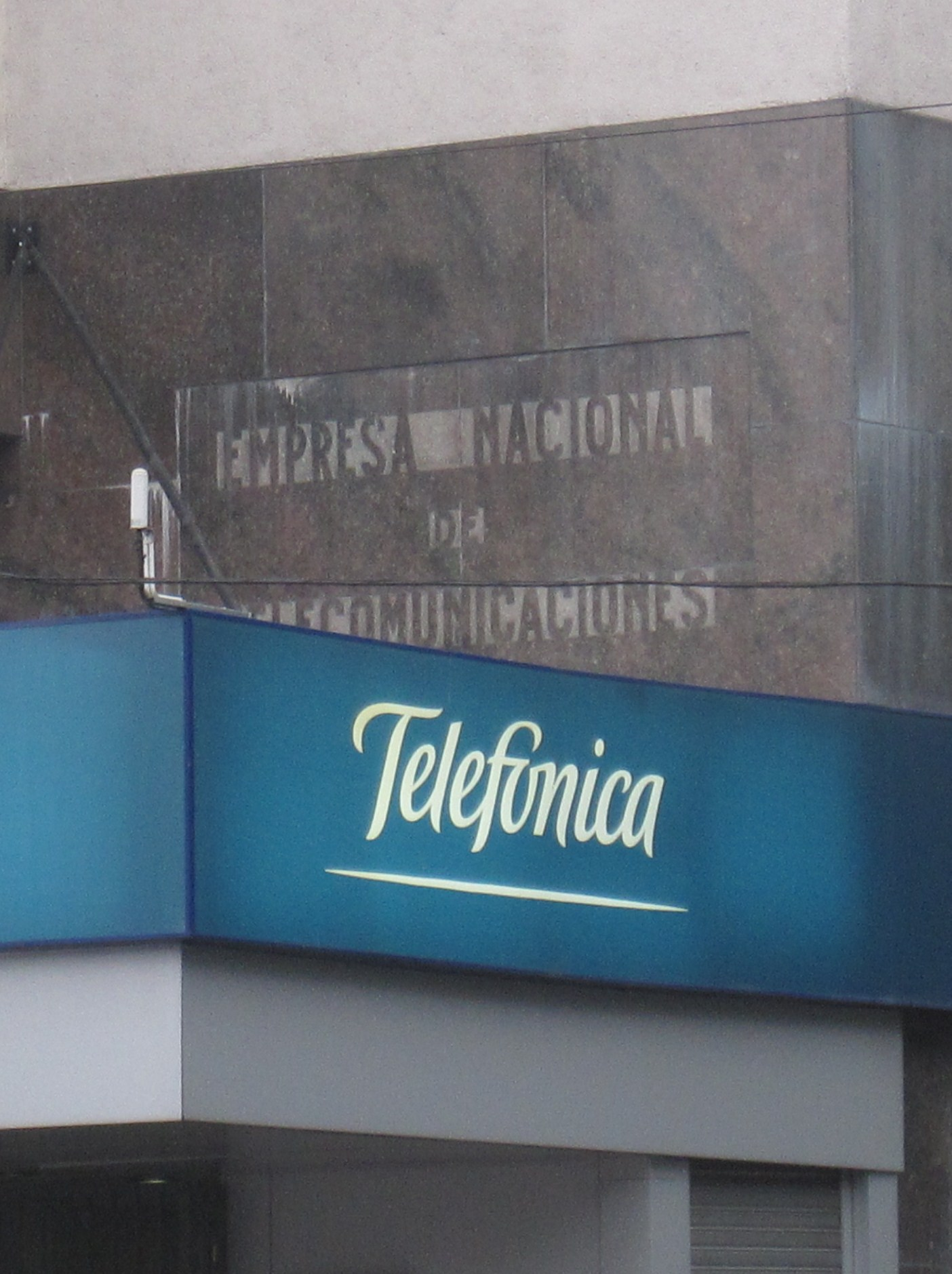
- Court: Court of Justice
- Citation: (2014) C-295/12

Keywords
- Telecommunications

Telefónica SA v Commission (2014) C-295/12 is a European competition law case relevant for UK enterprise law, concerning telecommunications.

== Facts ==
Telefonica appealed against a Commission fine of €151m for abuse of dominance for wholesale ADSL broadband in Spain from 2001-2006. Telefonica had a statutory monopoly on retail provision of landlines before 1998. It was the only company with a nationwide fixed telephone network. It provided wholesale broadband to other telecomms companies, and its own retail services. The Commission found Telefonica imposed unfair prices through a margin squeeze on competitors, so the difference between their wholesale prices and its retail prices were not enough to make a profit. It assessed Telefonica’s downstream costs using LRAIC as the standard.

The General Court held that to establish a margin squeeze there was no need to show excessive or predatory prices: the abuse was in the spread available. The test was whether an equally efficient competitor, based on the dominant undertaking’s own costs could survive.

== Judgment ==
The CJEU upheld the General Court's decision in its entirety, so that Telefonica still had to pay a fine for abuse of a dominant position.

9. The General Court summarised the background to the dispute at paragraphs 3 to 29 of the judgment under appeal as follows:

[...]

26 ... the Commission assessed the gravity and the impact of the infringement and also the size of the relevant geographic market. First of all, as regards the gravity of the infringement, the Commission considered that it was dealing with a clear-cut abuse on the part of an undertaking holding what was virtually a monopoly position, that must be qualified as “very serious” under the 1998 Guidelines (recitals 739 to 743 to the contested decision). At recitals 744 to 750 to the contested decision, the Commission distinguished the present case from Commission Decision 2003/707/EC of 21 May 2003 relating to a proceeding under Article [102 TFEU] (Case COMP/C 1/37.451, 37.578, 37.579 — Deutsche Telekom AG) (OJ 2003 L 263, p. 9; “the Deutsche Telekom decision”), in which the abuse on the part of Deutsche Telekom, which also concerned a margin squeeze, had not been qualified as “very serious” within the meaning of the 1998 Guidelines. Next, so far as the impact of the infringement found was concerned, the Commission took account of the fact that the relevant markets were of considerable economic importance, that they played a crucial role in the creation of the information society and that the impact of Telefónica’s abuse on the retail market had been significant (recitals 751 and 753 to the contested decision). Last, as regards the size of the relevant geographic market, the Commission observed, in particular, that the Spanish broadband market was the fifth largest national broadband market in the European Union (EU) and that, while margin squeeze cases were necessarily limited to a single Member State, it prevented operators from other Member States from entering a fast-growing market (recitals 754 and 755 to the contested decision).

27 According to the contested decision, the starting amount of the fine, EUR 90 000 000, takes account of the fact that the gravity of the abusive practice became clear over the period under consideration and, more particularly, after the adoption of the Deutsche Telekom decision (recitals 756 and 757). A multiplier of 1.25 was applied to that amount to take account of Telefónica’s significant economic capacity and to ensure that the fine was sufficiently deterrent, and the starting amount of the fine was thus increased to EUR 112 500 000 (recital 758).

28 Second, as the infringement had lasted from September 2001 until December 2006, that is to say, for five years and four months, the Commission increased the starting amount of the fine by 50%. The basic amount of the fine was thus increased to EUR 168 750 000 (recitals 759 to 761 to the contested decision).

29 Third, on the basis of all the evidence available, the Commission considered that the existence of certain attenuating circumstances could be recognised in this case, since the infringement had at least been committed as a result of negligence. A reduction of 10% of the amount of the fine was thus granted to Telefónica, which reduced the amount of the fine to EUR 151 875 000 (recitals 765 and 766 to the contested decision).’

[...]

74 By the third part of their first ground of appeal, the appellants maintain that, at paragraph 182 of the judgment under appeal, the General Court distorted the facts and infringed their rights of defence by finding that they had not relied on the non‑essential nature of wholesale products when assessing the effects of their conduct.

75 That argument is ineffective, as pointed out by the Advocate General at point 27 of his Opinion, since the appellants’ reliance on the non-essential nature of wholesale products formed part of a broader argument in which the General Court was invited to apply the criteria established by the Court of Justice in Bronner (Case C‑7/97 EU:C:1998:569) in connection with a refusal to supply amounting to abuse. As is apparent from paragraphs 180 and 181 of the judgment under appeal, the abusive conduct of which the appellants stand accused, which took the form of a margin squeeze, constitutes an independent form of abuse distinct from that of refusal to supply, so that the criteria established in Bronner (EU:C:1998:569) were not applicable in the present case (Case C‑52/09 TeliaSonera Sverige EU:C:2011:83, paragraphs 55 to 58).

[...]

124... in order to establish that a practice such as margin squeeze is abusive, that practice must have an anti-competitive effect on the market, although the effect does not necessarily have to be concrete, it being sufficient to demonstrate that there is a potential anti‑competitive effect which may exclude competitors who are at least as efficient as the dominant undertaking (see TeliaSonera Sverige EU:C:2011:83, paragraph 64) and, second, the General Court found at paragraph 282 of the judgment under appeal, in its assessment of the facts, that the Commission had demonstrated that there were such potential effects.

== See also ==
- United Kingdom enterprise law
- EU law
