= Irsai Olivér =

Variety of grape

- Grape (Vitis)
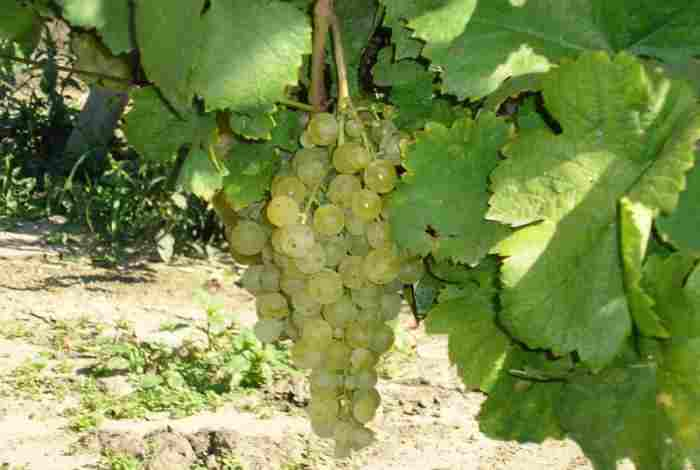
- Irsai Olivér in a Moldovan vineyard.
- Color of berry skin: Blanc
- Species: Vitis vinifera
- Origin: Hungary
- Original pedigree: Pozsonyi × Perle von Csaba
- Breeder: Pál Kocsis
- Year of crossing: 1930
- VIVC number: 5557

Irsai Olivér is a Hungarian white wine variety, cross-bred between Pozsonyi and Pearl of Csaba in 1930. It ripens early and has a distinctive Muscat character.

== Description and spread ==
This relatively recent Hungarian cross has rare leafage, big, loose clusters of grapes, and resistance to many vine diseases. The grapes ripen in August.

This type of wine can be compared to Pinot Grigio, but gives more fragrance, similar to Muscat. Its light, green-yellow color associates with a fragrance reminiscent of tropical fruits and lemon, and a low acidity level. Irsai Olivér alone is best drunk young, but is often improved by blending with a more structured variety.

Irsai is mostly planted in Hungary, although it appears in Moldova, Slovakia and Russia. The wine is popular in Central Europe, as an easy-going, true chilled summer wine. It goes well with less spicy Hungarian dishes, but it is more often drunk between meals, often with soda water (as fröccs i. e. Spritzer).

== Synonyms ==
Irsai Olivér has been known also under the synonyms Aranyló, Aranyló Korai, Irchai Oliver, Irsai, Irsai Olivér Muskotály, Irshai Oliver, Korai Aranyló, Muscat Oliver, Muskat Irsai Oliver, Muskat Oliver, Olivér Irsai, Oliver Irsay, Zoeloetistii Rannii, Zolotisti Ranij, Zolotistyi Rannii, Zolotistyi Ranniy, Zolotistyj Rannij, and Zolotisztuej Rannij.

== See also ==
- Hungarian grape varieties
- Cserszegi fűszeres
