= Elgin Mental Health Center =

Psychiatric hospital in northern Illinois, United States

Coordinates: 42.01545°N 88.28812°W

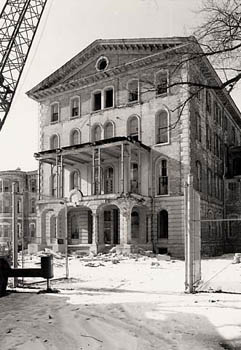
- Main entrance of the Center Building of the Elgin State Hospital in early 1993, just before demolition
- Interactive map of the Elgin Mental Health Center area
- Former names: Elgin State Hospital; Northern Illinois Hospital and Asylum for the Insane

General information
- Status: Active - Most of old campus demolished
- Type: Mental Care Facility; Hospital
- Architectural style: Italianate
- Location: Elgin, IL, 750 S State Street, United States
- Groundbreaking: 1870 (North wing); July 1st, 1873 (Central section and South wing)
- Completed: July 30, 1874
- Opened: April 3rd, 1872
- Closed: 1973 (Kirkbride building)
- Demolished: Early 1993
- Cost: $330,000 USD (1874)

Technical details
- Structural system: Kirkbride Plan
- Material: Brick and stone
- Size: North/South length: 776ft 4in; East/West width: 401ft
- Floor count: 4 (Center section and transverse wings); 3 (Intermediate, longitudinal wings)
- Grounds: 1,139 acres

Design and construction
- Architect: Stephen V. Shipman
- Developer: State of Illinois
- Main contractor: Fish, Stephens and Sorenson (Center section and South wing); W. F. Bushnell & Co (North wing)

The Elgin Mental Health Center (formerly Elgin State Hospital & the Northern Illinois Hospital and Asylum for the Insane) is a mental health facility operated by the State of Illinois in Elgin, Illinois. Throughout its history, Elgin's mission has changed. At times, it treated mental illness, tuberculosis, and provided federally funded care for veterans. The hospital's site, which included a patient-staffed farm reached a maximum of 1,139 acres (461 ha) after World War II. Its maximum population was reached in the mid-1950s with 7,700 patients. Between 1993 and 2008, most of the older buildings in the complex were demolished due to being in poor condition as the result of being abandoned for decades. The site is/was popular among teens and in the paranormal world due to its claims of hauntings in the older buildings and the hospital's cemetery.

== History ==
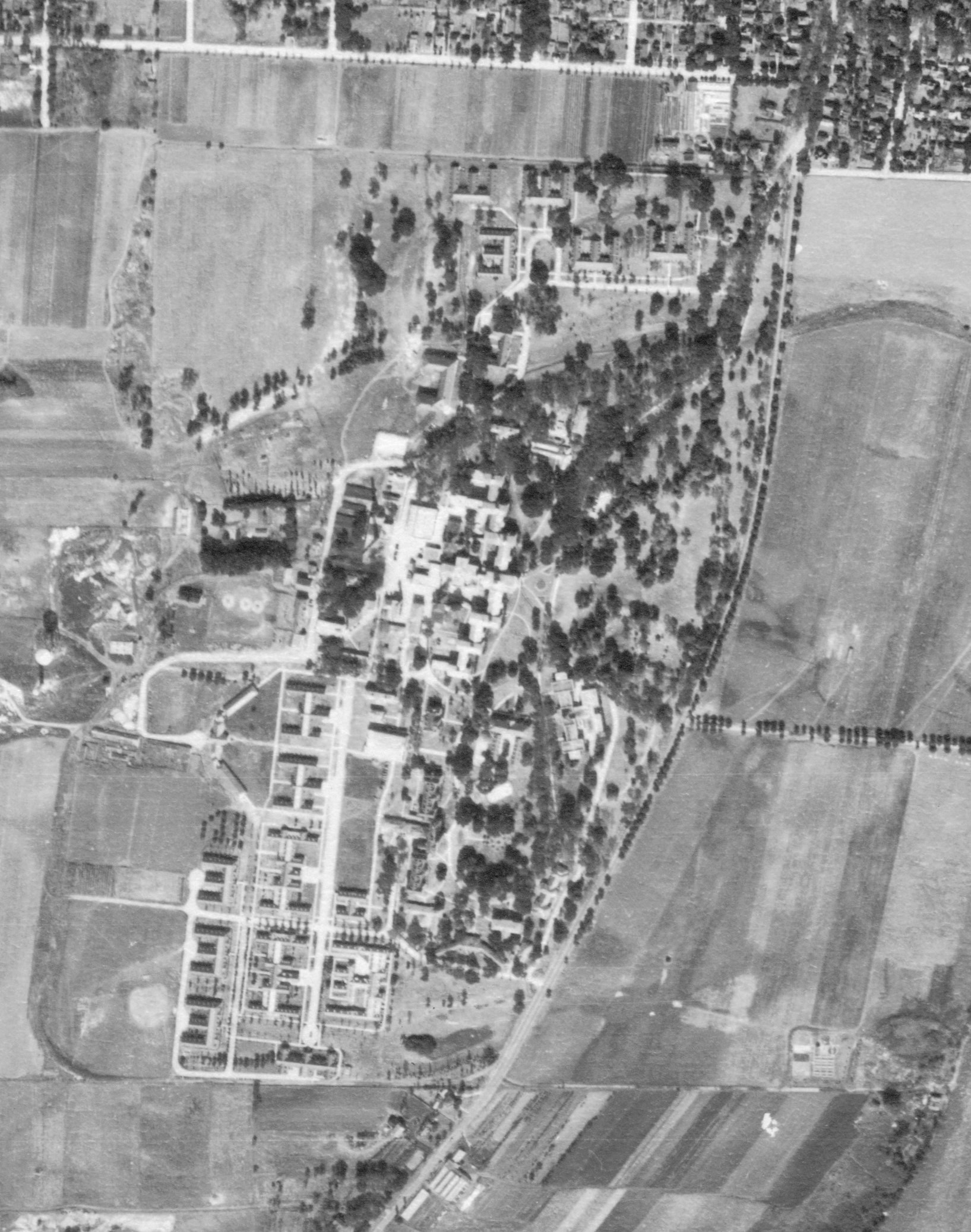
Aerial photo of the main 207-acre campus taken on September 28, 1939

Illinois' first mental hospital opened in Jacksonville, Illinois in 1851, but the need for two more hospitals serving Northern and Southern Illinois became apparent. The legislature authorized the two new hospitals on April 16, 1869. The result was the establishment of the Northern Illinois Hospital and Asylum for the Insane. The next step was to secure a location near Chicago which led to many new and growing towns to compete for the selection of the hospital. To gain this important source of future employment, the City of Elgin sold more than $40,000 worth of bonds to purchase 80 acres (32 ha) of land southwest of the city limits and also promised to provide free freight to the site for building materials. After the site was selected in Elgin, a Board of Trustees, primarily consisting of prominent Elgin residents, were appointed to construct and run the new hospital.

The Trustees followed the recommendations of the Association of Medical Superintendents of American Institutions for the Insane (AMSAII), in terms of the amount of land required and also by adopting the Kirkbride Plan for the Central Building. Colonel S. V. Shipman, who had designed the main building of the Mendota, Wisconsin State Hospital, was selected as the architect of the Elgin building. Early bids for the Center Building emerged in 1870. Construction soon began on the North wing of the Kirkbride type structure with the second phase beginning on July 1, 1873. Need for the hospital was sufficiently urgent that the facility opened during construction in 1872, with the North wing completed by that time. Construction continued simultaneously with hospital operations. The building was finally completed on July 30, 1874. As the need arose, expansions were added to the Center Building and other structures were built. The front expanse of the Center Building was just over 776 ft (236.6 m) long and was designed to be narrow in order to offer natural light and ventilation. The building was used until the mid-1970s.

Officially opening its doors on April 3, 1872, as the Northern Illinois Hospital and Asylum for the Insane, it did not take long for the hospital to receive its first criminal patient who was deemed "not guilty by reason of insanity" in 1873. This "forensic" population grew until the legislature established a separate state hospital for the forensic population in Chester, Illinois in 1889. its first superintendent was Edwin Arius Kilbourne.

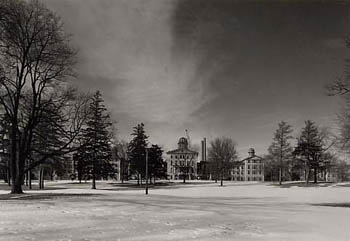
Front view of Center Building

The hospital eventually outgrew the Central Building and the need for more buildings was obvious. The new Annex building was opened in 1891. It featured a variation of the Kirkbride Plan as the base for its design. It was located just south of the Center Building. It added 300 additional beds to the hospital, a much-needed step due to its growing population. Sister buildings that resembled the Annex at Elgin State were also built at Jacksonville State Hospital and Anna State Hospital. The Annex was closed in 1971 and razed in 1972 to make way for a newer and more modern building.

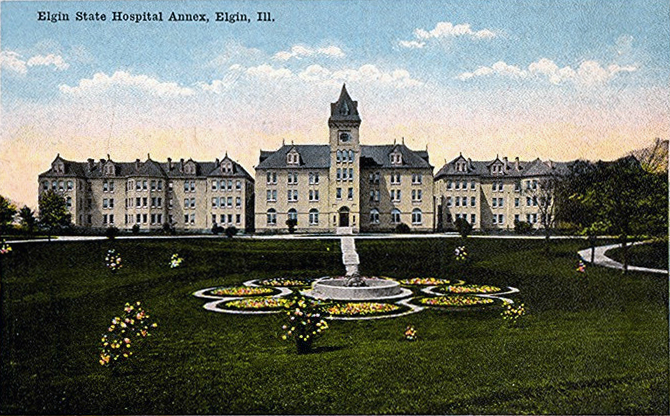
Postcard image of the Annex building at Elgin State Hospital.

Prior to 1894, many physically ill patients were denied admission to the state hospitals as being too infirm to benefit from care and were kept in local almshouses. However, changes in Illinois laws required that they be treated by the state hospitals. As a result, in 1894, Wing Hall opened as a detached infirmary building, bringing the total hospital capacity to 1,107 beds. In 1910, a 110-bed infirmary for female patients opened in an addition to the north end of the Center Building called "D-North" bringing the bed capacity to 1,210. These buildings were replaced in 1921 with the construction of a new general hospital located between the Central Building and the Annex. In 1967, the general hospital was replaced by a new Medical and Surgical Building. The new circular building was designed by Bertrand Goldberg, who also designed Marina City in Chicago.

The name Elgin State Hospital was adopted on January 1, 1910, shortly after the administration of all state charitable institutions came under the new Board of Administration, which replaced the previous Board of State Commissioners of Public Charities and the local board of trustees. In 1917, the Department of Public Welfare assumed responsibility for Elgin State Hospital and retained control until the creation of the Department of Mental Health in 1961 (L. 1961, p. 2666).

The hospital attracted staff by offering subsidized housing on its grounds. Both the Central Building and the Annex included staff apartments. Later a separate Nurses' Home, Staff House, Ricketts & Carriel Hall offered staff apartments. There were also at least seven single-family houses. Cooking and laundry facilities were provided to employees, but many ate in central staff dining rooms located in the Center Building and the Staff House. Senior staff had their own dining room on the second floor of the Center Building. The cost of housing, food and laundry was deducted from employee paychecks. In 1965, the hospital began to phase out staff housing, with the last residents departing in 1969.

Following World War I, the federal veteran's bureau contracted with the State of Illinois to erect new buildings on the grounds of the state hospitals to care for veterans. Elgin received the first such building, named Wilson Cottage, which was opened in 1921. The veteran's program was a "hospital within a hospital" with separate federal funding. Elgin State continued to maintain over 400 beds for ex-servicemen through the 1930s.

In 1929, the Illinois State Psychopathic Institute relocated to the grounds of Elgin State, which included schools for nursing, hydrotherapy and occupational therapy. The institute also conducted clinical trials for new drugs. Although the Institute moved to the Medical campus of the University of Illinois in 1935, its laboratory remained at Elgin State. Further innovations at Elgin came from the pastoral training of its chaplain Anton Boisen.

Beginning in 1962, a series of expansions were undertaken by architect Bertrand Goldberg. These expansions provided a new laundry building as well as additional space for patients. Goldberg's structures are currently not used. Within the next decade, many of the older buildings began to be phased out of use due to a declining population, leading to the closing of the main Center Building in 1973.

In 1975, the hospital changed its name to the present Elgin Mental Health Center.

In 1983, the Governor decided that state hospital operations would be consolidated, and closed the hospitals in Manteno and Galesburg with certain patients being transferred to Elgin. In 1987, Illinois and the United States Justice Department entered into a consent decree committing to greater resources at Elgin and improved patient care.

== Farm colony ==
From its founding through the 1960s, the hospital maintained a farm to supply a portion of its food needs. For example, an October 1, 1880 inventory reported 285 hogs, 40 cattle and 26 horses. The original farm was located to the west of the Center Building and Annex. In the 1880s, a slaughterhouse was built along the Fox River to provide meat for the hospital. In 1929, the state purchased the 143-acre (58 ha) farm adjacent to the southwest corner of its grounds, which brought its land area to 817 acres (331 ha) with another 190 acres (77 ha) under lease. The farm was adjacent to McLean Blvd on the west end of the grounds with three wards, a central kitchen, a power plant, a large dairy barn and a water tower. During the 1930s and 1940s the farm not only grew crops such as corn, but also raised 100 to 150 dairy cattle, 500 to 1,500 hogs, and 5,000 chicken at any time. The farm colony housed able-bodied male patients. The farm colony contributed approximately one-third of the total cost of food used at the hospital, which fed both patients and staff. After World War II, the hospital reached its maximum size of 1,139 acres, but later shrunk as a portion of the grounds were assigned to the State Highway Department for the construction of US Route 20 and the Elgin Community College campus. Nothing much of the farm remains today, an old horse barn still stands on the original grounds.

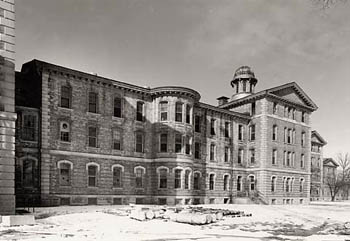
North wing of the Center Building

== Demolition of original campus ==
The first significant loss of the original campus was in 1972 when the Annex Building was razed to make way for a more modern facility during a renovation and modernization period. The hospital's Center Building was in serious disrepair by the early 1990s. Years of abandonment and neglect had turned the once beautiful structure into a horrid eyesore. At one point, some proposed that the Center Building be used for the Elgin Police Department's new headquarters. However, plans never actually materialized and EPD built a new headquarters in downtown Elgin in 1994. While attempts were made to try the save the structure, it was to no avail. Stalled for demolition in the spring and summer of 1993, the Historic American Buildings Survey team was contacted by the State of Illinois & the City of Elgin to document the building. By fall 1993, the Kirkbride style building was finally razed after standing for 119 years. Throughout the rest of the 1990s and 2000s, most of the former facilities and buildings of the hospital that were located at the northern half of the property were demolished. Most of the old campus was then sold to the City of Elgin for future development. As of 2018, only the Powerhouse which is still in operation, along with the New Administration Building (built in 1967), as well as some of the original asphalt roads, curbs, and sidewalks remain. The old hospital cemetery is kept up well by volunteers and the City of Elgin.

Elgin Mental Health Center
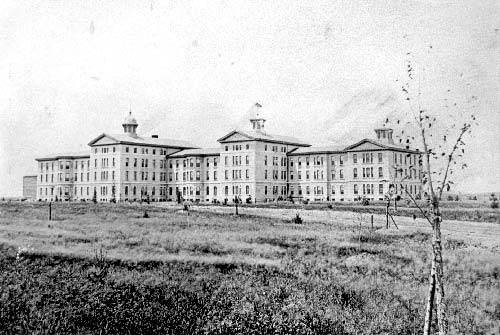
Northern Illinois Hospital and Asylum for the Insane after completion.

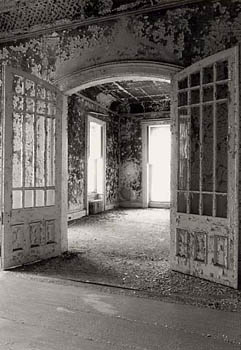
Original doors and architectural features still remained during demolition.

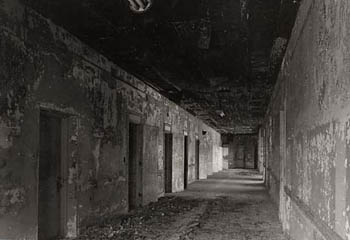
Hallways of Center Building at Elgin State

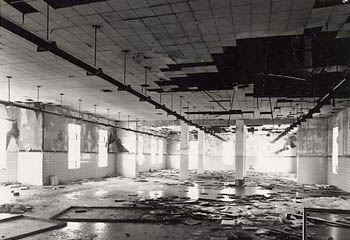
Old cafeteria

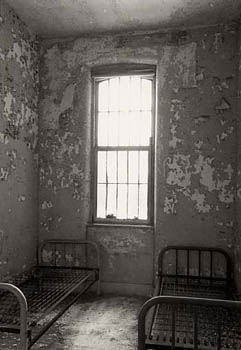
One of the interior rooms with two patient beds.

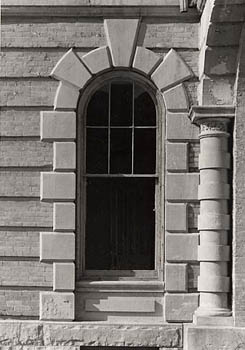
Italianate style windows

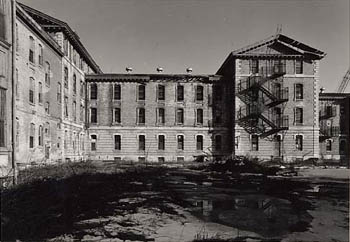
Looking at the start of the South wing from the rear of the building.

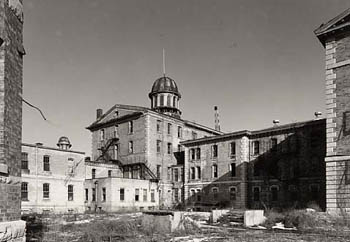
Rear of the center section from the southwest.

Superintendents/Hospital Administrators of Elgin Mental Health Center
Name	Years
Edwin A. Kilbourne	1871–1890
Henry Brooks	1890–1893
Arthur Loewy	1893–1897
John B. Hamilton	1897–1898
Frank Jenks (acting)	1898–1899
Frank Witman	1899–1906
Vaclav Podstata	1906–1910
Sidney D. Wilgus	1910–1911
Ralph Hinton	1911–1914 and 1917–1930
Henry J. Gahagan	1914–1917
Charles F. Read	1930–1946
D. Louis Steinberg	1946–1953
Daniel Haffron	1953–1963
Ernest S. Klein	1963–1970
Daniel Manelli	1970–1972
Robert J. Mackie	1972–1986
Roalda Alderman	1986–1991
Angelo Campagna	1992–1995
Nancy Staples	1996-
Rosamond Geary	
Raul Almazar	
Tajudeen Ibrahim	
Paul Brock	
Meredith Kiss	2013-2016
Brian Dawson	2016-2018
Diana Hogan	2019
Michelle Evans	2019-

== Today ==
While most of the complex was demolished and the area is no longer as large as it used to be, the Elgin Mental Health Center today is well and alive as it continues its mission to provide service for mental health. The hospital is primarily used to care for "forensic patients" who have been found "not guilty by reason of insanity", and those persons found "unfit to stand trial" but who are required by Illinois law to remain confined in a mental hospital for a period. The hospital also provides mental health inpatient treatment for adults from a specific geographic catchment area and works closely with the community mental health agencies and community hospital psychiatric units in its region.

Elgin Mental Health Center also serves as a training site for Psychiatry Residents from Chicago Medical School and Loyola University.

As of the end of fiscal year 2008, Elgin had 759.5 employees and an appropriation of $66,251,900. As of 2002, Elgin had 582 beds, 40 physicians, 163 registered nurses, and 67 medical social workers.

== Notable patients ==
- David Hyrum Smith, son of Joseph Smith, Jr., founder of the Latter Day Saint movement. Was confined for 27 years.
- Emanuel (Emil) Bronner - founder of "Dr. Bronner's Magic Soaps" company. Escaped from the hospital in 1945.
