= Bronner =

Bronner is a surname. Notable people with the surname include:

- Augusta Fox Bronner (1881–1966), American psychologist and author
- David Bronner (born 1973), American soap company executive and activist
- David G. Bronner (born 1945), American businessman
- E. H. Bronner (1908–1997), soapmaker
- Ethan Bronner (born 1954), American journalist
- Gerhard Bronner (1922–2007), Austrian composer
- Leila Leah Bronner (1930–2019), American Jewish historian and biblical scholar
- Liza Brönner (born 1989), Afrikaans singer and songwriter
- Oscar Bronner (born 1943), Austrian newspaper editor, son of Gerhard
- Rudolph Bronner (1890–1960), Australian broadcasting executive
- Simon J. Bronner (born 1954), American folklorist, historian, educator, and author
- Stephen Bronner (born 1949), American political philosopher

== See also ==
- Dr. Bronner's Magic Soaps
- Till Brönner, German jazz musician
- Bronner (grape), a grape variety
- Bronner Bros., African-American hair and skin care manufacturer
- Bronner's Christmas Wonderland, a Christmas store in Michigan, US
- Brunner (surname)
- Brenner (disambiguation)
