= Seattle Hempfest =

Cannabis festival in Seattle, Washington

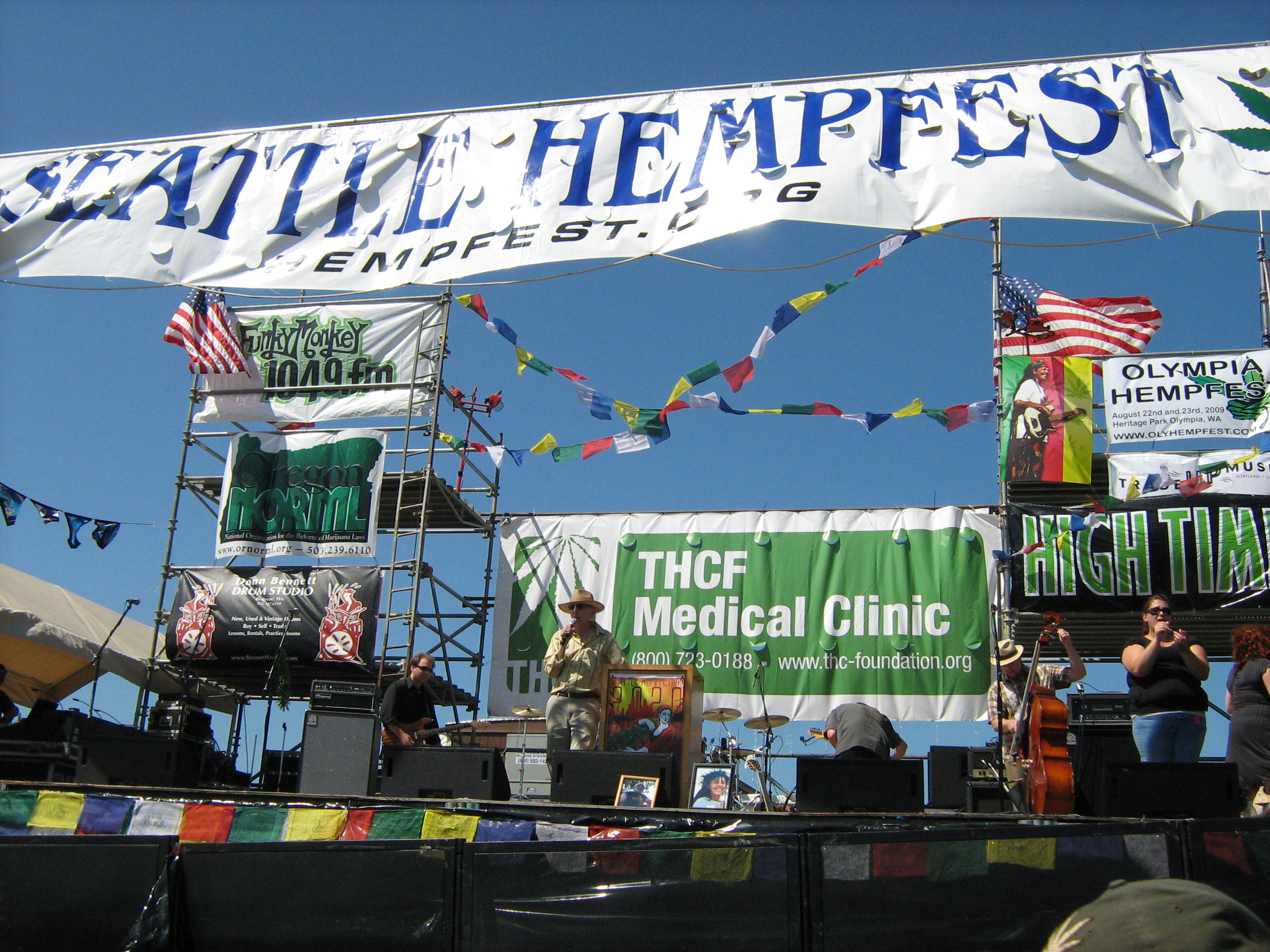
- Seattle city council member Nick Licata speaking at the 2009 Seattle Hempfest
- Genre: Political
- Frequency: Annually
- Locations: Myrtle Edwards Park, Seattle, Washington, U.S.
- Years active: 35
- Inaugurated: August 1, 1991
- Previous event: 10 October 2020 – 11 October 2020
- Attendance: 100,000
- Budget: $1,000,000
- Organiser: Seattle Events, a Non-Profit Corporation
- Member: Hempfest Central; Seattle Peace Heathens Community Action Group
- Website: www.hempfest.org

Seattle Hempfest was an annual event in the city of Seattle, Washington, United States, (and the world's largest annual gathering) advocating the legalization of cannabis. It was held every summer for 19 years, from 1991 to 2020, after which permission for vendors to use an access road was revoked and the logistical problems of getting vendors into and out of the park became an insurmountable obstacle. As of 2025, its future appears uncertain.

Vivian McPeak serves as the organization's executive director. Founded in 1991 as the Washington Hemp Expo, a self-described "humble gathering of stoners" attended by only 500 people, and renamed the following year as Hempfest, it grew into a three-day annual political rally, concert, and arts and crafts fair with attendance typically over 100,000. Speakers included Seattle City Council member Nick Licata, actor/activist Woody Harrelson (2004), travel writer and TV host Rick Steves (2007), (2010), 2012 Green Party speaker Jill Stein, Dallas Cowboys center Mark Stepnoski (2003), and former chief of the Seattle Police Department Norm Stamper (2006). Hempfest also in recent years attracted such well-known performers as Fishbone (2002), The Kottonmouth Kings (2004), Rehab (2006), and Pato Banton (2007) to its five stages spread throughout Myrtle Edwards Park and Elliott Bay Park, on Seattle's waterfront.

== History ==
Early Hempfests "featured blatant marijuana smoking"; 60 people were cited for illegal marijuana use at the 1997 Hempfest, and about 20 were arrested the following year. Eventually Hempfest and the police reached a modus vivendi: there was only one arrest in 2001. About this time, the director was Dominic Holden, who was also campaign manager of an organization trying to make cannabis the city of Seattle's lowest law enforcement priority through a voter initiative, I-75. The political context surrounding marijuana in Seattle and Washington has changed considerably over the years. Washington legalized medical marijuana in 1998. In 2003, Seattle passed I-75.

The 2008 Seattle Hempfest, which took place August 16–17, set a new record for attendance, topping 310,000 people. The volunteers of Seattle Hempfest were awarded the National Organization for the Reform of Marijuana Laws (NORML) award for "Outstanding Cannabis Advocate of the Year Award" on October 17, 2008 at the National NORML Conference for their efforts.

2011 Hempfest speakers included numerous elected officials, among them Ohio congressman Dennis Kucinich, Seattle Mayor Mike McGinn, City Attorney Pete Holmes, a return by Councilman Licata, and Washington State Representatives Mary Lou Dickerson and Roger Goodman.

2013 saw the legalization of cannabis use in Washington state; that year's Seattle Hempfest featured performances by Everlast, Hed PE and DJ Muggs of Cypress Hill. As of 2013, the festival had an annual budget of approximately $700,000.

The 2015 Hempfest named David Bronner, CEO of Dr. Bronner's Magic Soaps, the Cannabis Activist of the Year.

The 2020 Hempfest was the most recent event. The organizers once stated that they were planning to return in 2024, but as of 2025 Hempfest's future is uncertain.
