= Jacksonville Developmental Center =

Institution for developmentally delayed people in Jacksonville, Illinois, U.S.

Coordinates: 39.719248°N 90.229773°W

The Jacksonville Developmental Center was an institution for developmentally delayed clients, located in Jacksonville, Illinois. It was open from 1851 to November 2012. As of December 2012, the 134-acre (54 ha) grounds was still owned by the State of Illinois.

== History ==
Illinois originally did not have any system for caring for its mentally ill citizens who were either living with their family or kept in local almshouses. Dorothea Dix lobbied the state legislature to create a facility in Illinois designed for the care of the mentally ill. On March 1, 1847, the legislature established the Illinois State Asylum and Hospital for the Insane with a nine-member board of trustees that was empowered to appoint a superintendent, purchase land within four miles of Jacksonville, and construct facilities. (L. 1847, p. 52). At the time, only two other states had state-operated facilities for the mentally ill. The hospital was created to shift the economic burden of the mentally ill onto the state, which paid all of the patients' expenses. However, patients (or their county of residence) remained responsible for transportation, clothing and incidentals.

At the time, institutions for the mentally ill either had a number of small cottages, or a single large central building under the Kirkbride Plan. The trustees selected Kirkbride's approach for the new institution. The center building was five and a half stories high, with two separate wings for each gender extending with staggered setbacks from the center. In 1984, the building was listed on the National Register of Historic Places, although it was demolished in the 1970s.

Construction of the buildings was begun in 1848 and James M. Higgins was hired as Superintendent. Although Dix had expressed interest that Jacksonville State Hospital be opened by 1849, it wasn't until November 3, 1851, that the first two wards were ready for occupancy and the first patient, Sophronia McElhiney, of McLean County, was admitted.

In 1860, Elizabeth P.W. Packard's husband had her committed to Jacksonville against her will, due to a disagreement over her religious beliefs. At the time, Illinois law (which was enacted when the hospital opened) had an exception to its commitment hearing requirement to allow husbands to confine their wives to an asylum without any hearing. After three years, she was discharged from the hospital. Her husband then imprisoned her in their home, and after gaining her freedom through a lawsuit, she formed the Anti-Insane Asylum Society. She led a campaign to amend the Illinois law to guarantee a public hearing for all people declared insane, including women whose husbands wished to have them committed. She also saw similar laws passed in three other states.

Jacksonville remained Illinois' only such hospital until two additional facilities, the hospital at Elgin and the hospital at Anna, were authorized in 1869, and the legislature renamed Jacksonville as the Illinois Central Hospital for the Insane, assumed primary responsibility for patients from the counties of central Illinois. As a part of this reorganization, the legislature also reduced the size of Jacksonville's board of trustees to three members and the newly created a new statewide Board of State Commissioners of Public Charities to supervise all state institutions while each one retained its own separate board.

When the Board of State Commissioners of Public Charities was abolished in 1909, the institute was reorganized and renamed Jacksonville State Hospital effective January 1, 1910. In 1917, the Department of Public Welfare assumed responsibility for Jacksonville State Hospital and retained control until the creation of the Illinois Department of Mental Health in 1961 (L. 1961, p. 2666).

From 1944 to 1974, the hospital provided training in psychiatric nursing for students from general hospital nursing schools. Jacksonville's Psychiatric Nursing Affiliation Program, which was headed by the State Alienist.

In 1974, Jacksonville State Hospital's duties expanded beyond in-patient care of mental illness to include treatment for the *developmentally disabled." To reflect this change in mission, the legislature renamed it the Jacksonville Mental Health and Developmental Center' in 1975. (P.A. 79-581, p. 1895.) Jacksonville phased out its in-patient treatment of mental illness and its name was changed one last time to reflect its new mission.

=== Final years ===
When closed, the Jacksonville Developmental Center treated primarily developmentally delayed patients, some of whom also had mental illnesses. The center was operated by the Illinois Department of Human Services.

As of the end of fiscal year 2009, Jacksonville had 400 employees and an appropriation of $30,107,300.

In September 2011, Governor Pat Quinn announced a plan to close the facility in February 2012 due to budget issues.

The last residents were moved out in late November 2012.

== Famous patients ==
- Elizabeth Packard

== Books ==
- Packard, Elizabeth,The Prisoners' Hidden Life Or Insane Asylums Unveiled (1868) Kessinger Publishing, LLC (February 21, 2008) ISBN 978-0-548-83741-2.
- Packard, Elizabeth, Marital Power Exemplified in Mrs. Packard's Trial Fred B Rothman & Co (October 1994) ISBN 978-0-8377-2552-9
