= Cserszegi fűszeres =

Variety of grape

- Grape (Vitis)
- Color of berry skin: Blanc
- Also called: Cserszegi Fűszeres
- Origin: Hungary
- Notable regions: Hungary
- VIVC number: 3277

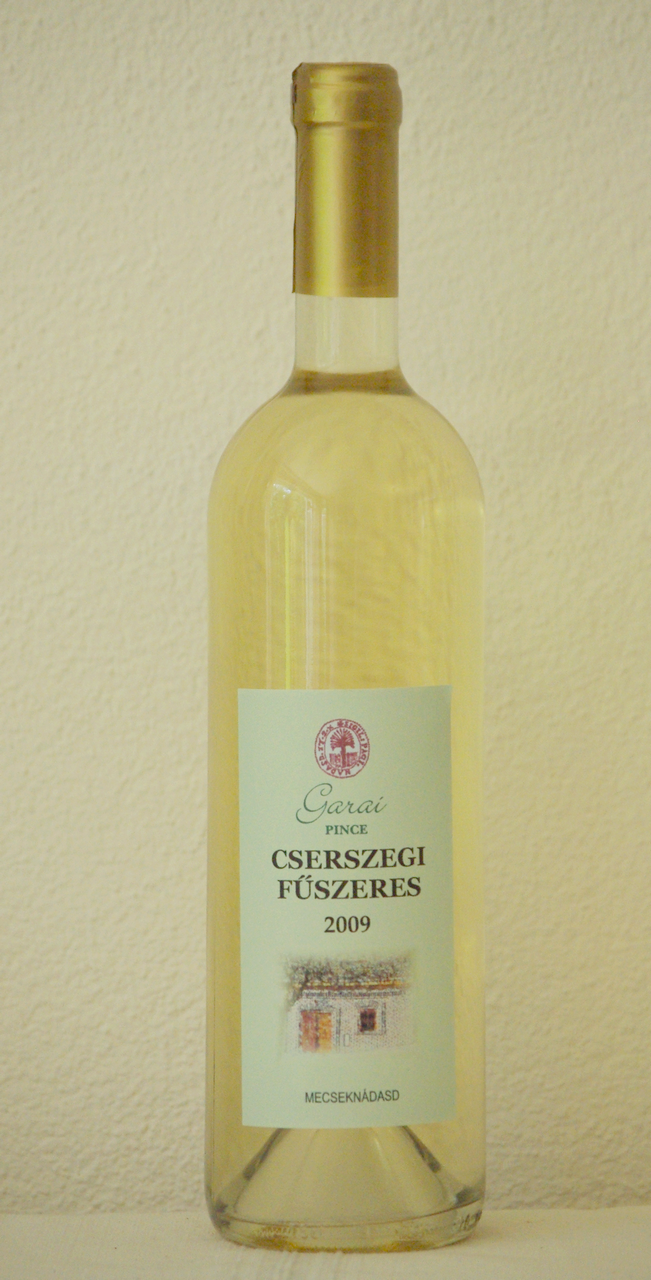
A bottle of Cserszegi fűszeres wine from the Mecsek region of southern Hungary

Cserszegi fűszeres is the name of a white Hungarian wine-grape variety and of the wine made from it. Its name derives from its place of origin: the village of Cserszegtomaj, near Keszthely. The attribute fűszeres means spicy.

== Origin and character ==
The white Cserszegi fűszeres grape was created as a hybrid between Irsai Olivér and Roter Traminer. It belongs to the Traminer family and is closely related to Gewürztraminer. It was bred in 1960 by Károly Bakonyi (died 2010), who taught at the Pannon University of Agriculture.

The grape variety has a high yield with a high sugar content. It is not unduly sensitive to cold, but it may suffer in a drought. The grapes ripen early and are picked in the second half of September. Its wines are dry or off dry and have a distinctive aroma and a flavorsome taste with a harmonious acidity. It is appreciated especially when new. The variety is often known informally as "spiced wine" (fűszeres bor) in Hungary.

Cserszegi fűszeres wine in Hungary comes mainly from vineyards in the Csongrád, Hajós–Baja and Kunság regions of the Great Hungarian Plain and the Etyek–Buda, Balatonfelvidék, Zala and Mecsek regions of Transdanubia.

== Notes ==
- Some information has been taken from the Hungarian Wikipedia page.

== See also ==
- Hungarian grape varieties
- Irsai Olivér
