= Anne Hazen McFarland =

American physician, medical journal editor

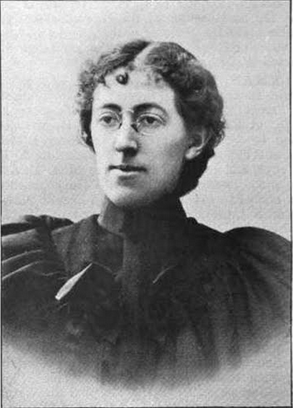
- Photo in (1896) Physicians and Surgeons of America, 1896
- Born: Anne Hazen McFarland; October 10, 1868; Lexington, Kentucky, U.S.
- Died: December 13, 1930 (aged 62); Tallahassee, Florida, U.S.
- Education: University of Kentucky; Northwestern University
- Occupations: physician; medical journal editor
- Spouses: Vincent Carroll Cromwell (m. 1896; died 1899); J. Thompson Sharpe (m. 1901)
- Children: 2
- Relatives: Andrew McFarland

Anne Hazen McFarland (née, McFarland; after first marriage, Cromwell; after second marriage, Sharpe; October 10, 1868 – December 13, 1930) was an American physician and medical journal editor. She specialized in the treatment of mental illness in women. McFarland criticized the contemporary idea that gynecological disorders caused insanity and nervousness in them.

== Early life and education ==
Anne Hazen McFarland was born October 10, 1868, (Note: Watson (1896) records McFarland's date of birth as October 10, 1867.) in Lexington, Kentucky. She was the daughter of Dr. George Clinton and Elizabeth Eliott (Bush) McFarland, also a native of Kentucky. Both the McFarland and Bush families were represented in the Revolutionary War. She was the granddaughter of Andrew McFarland, M. D., LL. D., for many years Superintendent of the Illinois Central Hospital for the Insane. George McFarland, after a service in the Civil War, practiced medicine in Kentucky from 1866 until 1880.

At the age of 12, along with her parents, Anne Hazen McFarland went to live with her grandfather, Andrew McFarland, at Jacksonville, Illinois, who was a celebrated specialist in the treatment of the insane, and founder of Oak Lawn Retreat, also in Jacksonville. In time, her father became Assistant Physician of the Oak Lawn Sanitarium.

McFarland graduated from the Jacksonville Female Academy (merged with Illinois College) after a four-year course in 1887, and later took a course in bookkeeping and stenography at the University of Kentucky. Andrew McFarland saw in his granddaughter the elements from which his theory for the fitness of women for the care of the female insane could be tested, and after a preliminary study under the direction of her father and her grandfather, in 1888, she entered the Woman's Medical College of Northwestern University, Chicago, Illinois. After three courses of medical lectures, she graduated with honors on March 30, 1891.

== Career ==
After graduation from medical school, McFarland began working as Medical Superintendent of the Oak Lawn Sanitarium, fulfilling her grandfather's wish that she make a special study of the care of the insane. She was a specialist in the department of nervous system disease. She removed a fibroid tumor in a case of acute mania, in June, 1893; and performed four operations upon the heads of epileptics, with two negative results, one improved, and the last cured. McFarland was a critic of contemporary notions that gynecological disorders caused insanity and nervousness in women. She "ridiculed the gynecological hypothesis as 'dull' and as serving the economic interests of physicians 'who otherwise should have to take to a change of occupation to earn a livelihood.'" In 1914, she was appointed the medical examiner for the women's department of Armour and Company.

McFarland wrote many papers upon various subjects, among them being "Treatment of the Insane", Transactions Illinois State Medical Society, 1892; "The Lunacy Law of Illinois", ibid., 1893; "Treatment of the insane", n.p., n.d.; "The Relations of Operative Gynecology to Insanity", Medical Review, June, 1893; "Nervous Men, Nervous Women", The Woman's Medical Journal, 1895; and "Nervous Troubles among Women", read before the Physical Culture Club, Springfield, Illinois. For a number of years, she served as associate editor of Woman's Medical Journal, published at Toledo, Ohio, which at the time, was the only woman's medical journal in the world.

McFarland was a member of the Illinois State Medical Society; Morgan County Medical Society, Brainard District Medical Society, the Capital Medical Society, and the American Medical Society. She was also a member and secretary of the Illinois Queen Isabella Medical Association.

== Personal life ==
On June 10, 1896, McFarland married Vincent Carroll Cromwell, in Jacksonville, Illinois. They lived at Cromwell place in Lexington, Kentucky, until his death in 1899. On January 2, 1901, also in Jacksonville, she married J. Thompson Sharpe of Port Elizabeth, New Jersey, whose father and grandfather were both physicians. After his marriage, J. Sharpe became the business manager of the Oak Lawn Sanitarium. McFarland had two sons: Vincent Carroll Cromwell, born August 25, 1897; and Maskell McFarland Sharpe, born January 6, 1902.

McFarland was a member of the Rector's Aid Society, the Home Economics Club, and the Country Club, as well as an honorary member of “The Fortnightly.” She was also a Colonial Dame and a Daughter of the American Revolution. In religion, she affiliated with the Trinity Episcopal Church.

== Style and themes ==
McFarland read a paper, "The Lunacy Law of Illinois", at the Annual Meeting of the Illinois State Medical Society in 1893. The Journal of the American Medical Association reported on it, saying:—

McFarland strongly condemned the existing law, and called attention to the fact that many insane patients who might be easily cured if placed in an asylum at an early stage of the disease were rendered incurably insane through the delay, and the excitement connected with their commitment. She paid her respects to the sensational newspaper reporter who gets committed to an insane asylum for the purpose of writing up alleged abuses. She made a strong plea for a new law which should be more humane in its conditions. Her conclusions are: that the provisions of the present law relating to the commitment of patients to hospitals for the insane seem to be based on the theory that insanity is a crime rather than a disease. That strict forms of legal commitment are followed by a diminution of recent cases and a disproportionate increase of the chronic class, and an increasing tendency to look upon hospitals for the insane as places of illegal detention. That every State should have a law empowering judges to send patients to insane asylums for observation in case of doubt of their sanity. That voluntary commitment should be provided for by the law. That the lunacy law of New York should be adopted by the Illinois legislature.
