= Vivian McPeak =

American musician

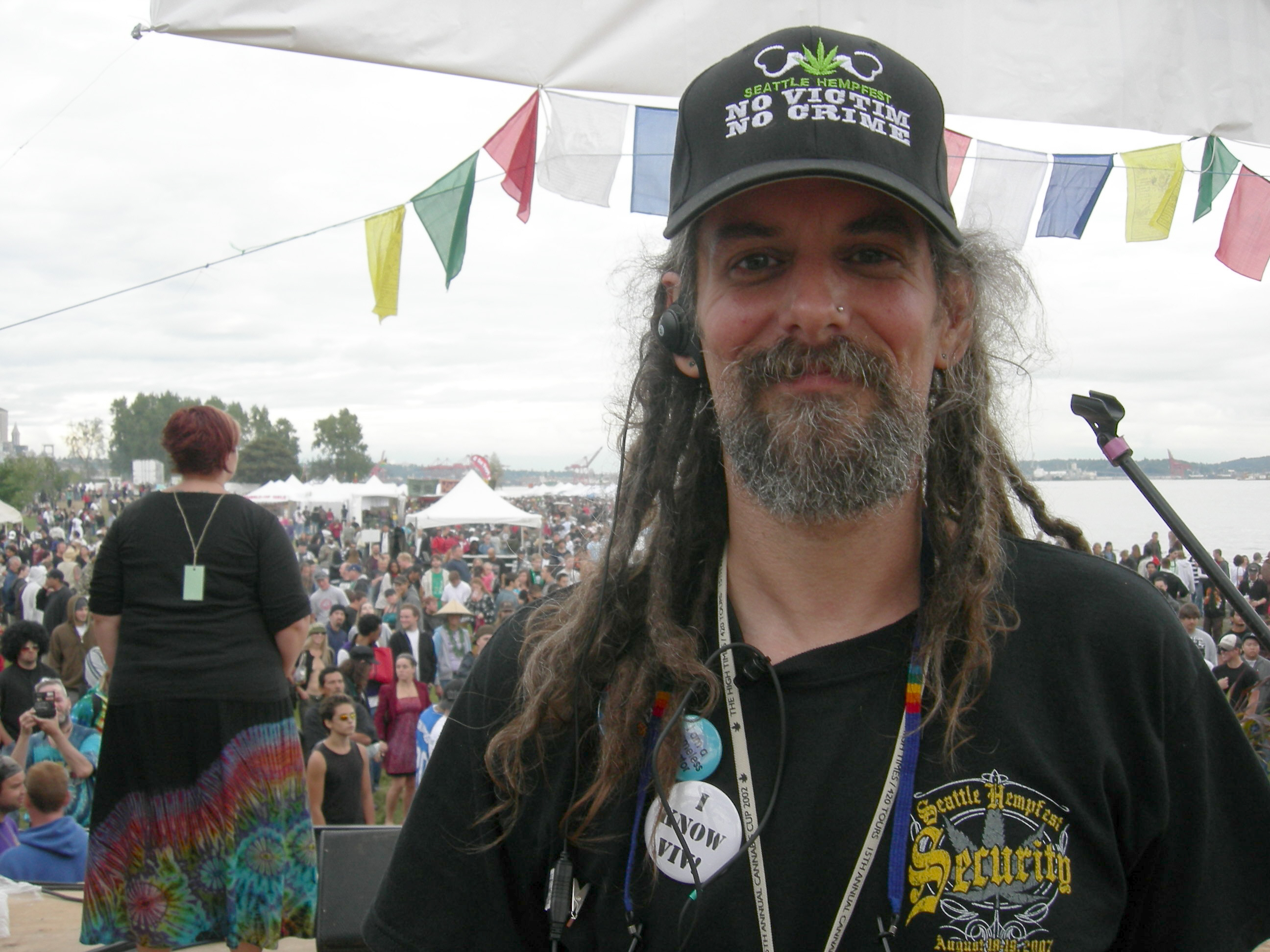
- Vivian McPeak at Seattle Hempfest in 2007
- Born: 1958; Los Angeles
- Occupations: Musician, activist
- Years active: 1988–present
- Known for: Seattle Hempfest
- Notable work: Protestival: A Twenty Year Retrospective of Seattle HEMPFEST

Vivian McPeak (born 1958) is an American peace, social justice activist, cannabis rights activist, and musician in Seattle, Washington. Mcpeak founded the Peace Heathens in 1988, a Seattle community action group. McPeak and Gary Cooke organized the first Seattle Hempfest in 1991, the 2-day event has grown to become the world's largest cannabis policy reform rally. McPeak, who is director of Hempfest, performed with the rock band Stickerbush in the 1980s.

== Life ==
Born in 1958 and raised in Los Angeles, California, McPeak came to Seattle to attend Ballard High for his sophomore year of high school in 1974. He lived in California, but returned to Seattle in 1986 after his California rock group broke up. In 1988 he founded the 'Seattle Peace Heathens Community Action Group' which started off with "just a piece of paper that was our creed, our kind of statement to the world."

The Peace Heathens group organized a Gas Works Park peace vigil in 1990, protesting the Gulf War. The protesters sang, meditated and one day invited a speaker from a marijuana law reform group, who didn't show up. As a response to that disappointment Gary Cooke suggested to McPeak that they organize a pot rally together. The "protestival" started in the spring of 1991 as the 'Washington Hemp Expo', with about 500 people in Volunteer Park. The following year, with the attendance quadrupling, it was renamed and continues to be known as the 'Seattle Hempfest'.

== Appearances ==
McPeak is the recipient of the High Times 2001 Freedom Fighter of the Year Award, as well as the 2012 High Times Lester Grinspoon Lifetime Achievement Award, the Dope Magazine Emery Award for lifetime achievement in the cannabis industry, and was listed by Seattle Magazine as one of the 50 Most Influential People of 2016.

McPeak has also appeared on numerous network and cable news outlets including CNN, FOX, and CNBC.

In 2015, McPeak was the opening keynote speaker at the inaugural Washington Cannabis Summit at the Crowne Plaza in Seatac, Washington.

== Publications ==
McPeak is the author of the book Protestival: A Twenty Year Retrospective of Seattle HEMPFEST. He has a weekly radio podcast at cannabisradio.com called Hempresent.

McPeak is a guest blogger for the SeattlePI.com, he has also been published in the "social-political-religious criticism and satire" magazine the Realist by Paul Krassner. Krassner in turn wrote a piece about McPeak for High Times, called 'The Trial of Vivian McPeak'.
