= Andrew McFarland =

American physician (1817–1891)

Dr. Andrew McFarland (14 July 1817 – 21 November 1891) was a United States physician.

== Biography ==
McFarland was born in Concord, New Hampshire. He was the son of Concord clergyman Asa McFarland and his wife Elizabeth Kneeland McFarland. McFarland attended Dartmouth College and lectured at Jefferson Medical College in 1843. He practiced medicine at Sandwich and Laconia, New Hampshire, and was appointed superintendent of the New Hampshire Asylum for the Insane in August 1845. After resigning in November 1852, he practiced in Concord and Lawrence, Massachusetts. About 1854, he became superintendent of the Illinois State Asylum for the Insane in Jacksonville, a role he held until 1869, when he resigned and established Oak Lawn Retreat, a private asylum in Jacksonville. Beyond his work in mental health, McFarland published a work of fiction titled, The Escape (Boston, 1851). He died by suicide in Jacksonville, Illinois, in 1891.

McFarland played a primary role in the wrongful commitment of Elizabeth Packard to the Jacksonville Insane Asylum (later known as the Illinois State Asylum) in the 1860s. As the superintendent of the asylum, he was responsible for the fate of many committed individuals, including Packard, who had been forcibly institutionalized by her husband for openly challenging him on theological and personal grounds. During her incarceration, Elizabeth persistently asserted her sanity, but McFarland consistently rebuffed her claims. Even when legal regulations evolved to allow institutionalized individuals the right to a public hearing, he continued to obstruct her release. Packard's experiences at the asylum under McFarland's oversight shone a spotlight on the abuses common in the psychiatric institutions of her day, including prescribing opium and blue mass (a mercury-based medicine), the poisonous tincture of veratria, “a concoction of quinine, arsenic, port wine, and cannabis”. Restraints, such as straitjackets, were used amongst the inmates and near drownings in ice cold or scorching hot water were also employed. Solitary confinement was another consequence as was mixing the murderers and truly mentally deranged inmates with the civil ones. After Elizabeth's release, she resolutely advocated for the rights and dignities of the patients committed to them. In 1869, spurred by growing public concerns about Packard's administration and accounts from former patients like Packard, the Illinois legislature launched a comprehensive investigation into the asylum's conditions and the treatment of its residents.

The investigation uncovered various deficiencies in care, questionable practices, and instances of neglect. Testimonies from former patients, supplemented by Packard's own account, painted a picture of life inside the asylum in which patient rights were frequently overlooked and the line between genuine medical care and punitive confinement was often blurred. These findings, aided by Packard's advocacy, ushered in a wave of reform in the state's mental health care system.

The 1869 legislative investigation also thrust McFarland's leadership into the public eye. Although some saw him as a progressive figure in the realm of mental health, the investigative findings, which corroborated the stories of former patients, raised serious questions about his methods and decision-making processes. The combined weight of these revelations eventually led to greater scrutiny of psychiatric institutions nationwide, prompting notable reforms in patient care, civil rights, and criteria for institutionalization.

In August 2023, the asylum was renamed from the Andrew McFarland Mental Health Center to the Elizabeth Parsons Ware Packard Mental Health Center, both in recognition of the mistreatment she suffered while incarcerated in the facility and to honor her subsequent work to reform mental health institutions.

== Legacy ==
McFarland's brother Asa was a noted New Hampshire journalist and politician. Immediately after graduation from medical school, his granddaughter, Anne Hazen McFarland, was installed as medical superintendent of the Oak Lawn Sanitarium, fulfilling her grandfather's earnest desire that she make a special study of the care of the insane.

== See also ==
- Moral treatment
