= Pearl of Csaba =

Variety of grape

- Grape (Vitis)
- Color of berry skin: Blanc
- Species: Vitis vinifera
- Also called: Perle von Csaba and other synonyms
- Origin: Hungary
- Original pedigree: Madeleine Angevine × Muscat Courtillier (but also claimed to be Bronner × Muscat Ottonel)
- Breeder: Adolf Stark and Janos Mathiasz
- Year of crossing: 1904
- VIVC number: 9166

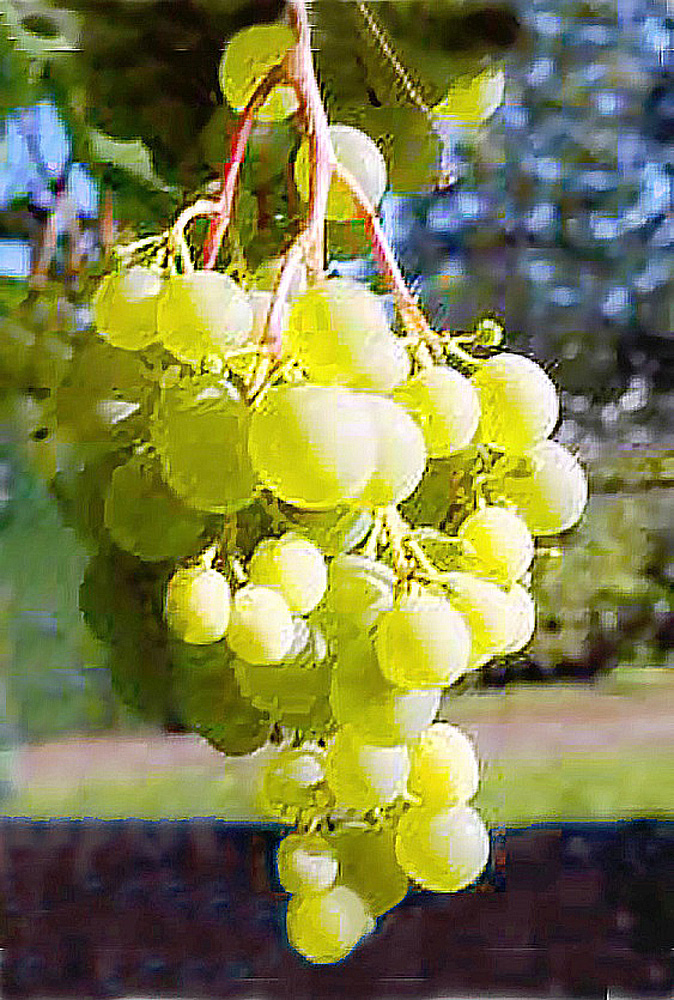
Pearl of Csaba

Pearl of Csaba (Csabagyöngye in Hungarian) is a white variety of grape. It was created in 1904 by the Hungarian viticulturalist Adolf Stark, presumably by crossing Madeleine Angevine × Muscat Courtillier (= Muscat Précoce de Saumur). Some sources instead state the parent varieties as Bronner x Muscat Ottonel, but this is seen as less likely. The variety's name was taken from the city Békéscsaba, which is also called Csaba for short.

Pearl of Csaba is primarily used as a table grape. Worldwide cultivation is estimated to be around 2,000 hectares (4,900 acres), and it is primarily found in Romania, Hungary and Bulgaria.
