= Elizabeth Packard =

American women's rights activist

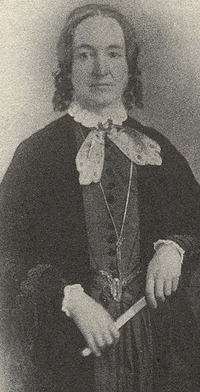
- Born: Elizabeth Parsons Ware; December 28, 1816; Ware, Massachusetts
- Died: July 25, 1897 (aged 80)
- Known for: Wrongful involuntary commitment
- Movement: Women's rights; Anti-Insane Asylum Society
- Spouse: Theophilus Packard
- Children: 6

Elizabeth Parsons Ware Packard (December 28, 1816 – July 25, 1897), also known as E.P.W. Packard, was an American advocate for the rights of women and people perceived to have insanity. She was wrongfully committed to an insane asylum by her husband, who claimed that she had been insane for more than three years. At her trial, however, a jury concluded that she was not insane after only seven minutes of deliberation. She later founded the Anti-Insane Asylum Society, campaigning for divorced women to retain custody of their children.

== Life ==
Elizabeth Packard, born in Ware, Massachusetts, was the oldest of three children and the only daughter of Samuel and Lucy Ware. Samuel was a Congregational minister in the Connecticut Valley of the Ware Congregational Church from 1810 to 1826. She was educated at the Amherst Female Seminary, where she studied French, algebra, and the new classics, thanks to the "adequate wealth" of her parents. In 1835, at age 19, she was diagnosed with brain fever, a nineteenth-century term for an illness thought to be caused by a severe emotional upset. When the family physician failed to help her, Samuel Ware decided to admit her to Worcester State Hospital, with Dr. Samuel Woodard at the helm; he was highly regarded for patient care. On the admission papers, Samuel Ware wrote that she suffered from "mental labor" from her occupation as a teacher. She remained in the hospital for six weeks.

At the insistence of her parents, Ware married Calvinist minister Theophilus Packard, fourteen years her senior and said to be "cold and domineering", on May 21, 1839. The couple had six children: Theophilus (b. 1842), Ira Ware (b. 1844), Samuel Ware (b. 1847), Elizabeth Ware (b. 1850), George Hastings (b. 1853), and Arthur Dwight (b. 1858). They lived in Western Massachusetts until September 1854. Beginning in 1857, after having lived in Ohio and Iowa for short periods, the family moved to Manteno, Illinois, and appeared to have a peaceful and uneventful marriage.

Theophilus, however, held quite decisive religious beliefs. After many years of marriage, Elizabeth Packard outwardly questioned her husband's beliefs and began expressing opinions that were contrary to his. While the main subject of their dispute was religion, the couple also disagreed on methods of child rearing and managing family finances, as well as the morality of slavery, with Elizabeth defending abolitionist John Brown, which embarrassed Theophilus.

When Illinois opened its first hospital for the mentally ill in 1851, the state legislature passed a law that within two years of its passage was amended to require a public hearing before a person could be committed against their will, with the exception that a husband could have his wife committed without either a public hearing or her consent. In 1860, Theophilus Packard judged that his wife was "slightly insane", a condition he attributed to "excessive application of body and mind". He arranged for a doctor, J.W. Brown, to speak with her. The doctor pretended to be a sewing machine salesman. During their conversation, Elizabeth complained of her husband's domination and his accusations to others that she was insane. Brown reported this conversation to Theophilus (along with the observation that Mrs. Packard "exhibited a great dislike to me"). Theophilus decided to have Elizabeth committed. She learned of this decision on June 18, 1860, when the county sheriff arrived at the Packard home to take her into custody.

Elizabeth Packard spent the next three years at the Jacksonville Insane Asylum in Jacksonville, Illinois (now the Jacksonville Developmental Center). She was regularly questioned by doctors, but refused to agree that she was insane or to change her religious views. In June 1863, due, in part, to pressure from her children, who wished her to be released, the doctors declared that she was incurable and discharged her. Upon her discharge, Theophilus locked her in the nursery of their home and nailed the windows shut. Elizabeth managed to drop a letter complaining of this treatment out of the window, which was delivered to her friend Sarah Haslett. Sarah Haslett in turn delivered the letter to Judge Charles Starr, who issued a writ of habeas corpus ordering Theophilus to bring Elizabeth to his chambers to discuss the matter. After being presented with Theophilus' evidence, Judge Starr scheduled a jury trial to allow a legal determination of Elizabeth's sanity to take place.

== Packard v. Packard ==
At the subsequent trial of Packard v. Packard, which lasted five days, Theophilus's lawyers produced witnesses from his family who testified that Elizabeth had argued with her husband and tried to withdraw from his congregation. These witnesses concurred with Theophilus that this was a sign of insanity. The record from the Illinois State Hospital stating that Mrs. Packard's condition was incurable was also entered into the court record.

Elizabeth's lawyers, Stephen Moore and John W. Orr, responded by calling witnesses from the neighborhood who knew the Packards but were not members of Theophilus' church. These witnesses testified they never saw Elizabeth exhibit any signs of insanity, while discussing religion or otherwise. The final witness was Dr. Duncanson, who was both a physician and a theologian. Dr. Duncanson had interviewed Elizabeth and he testified that while not necessarily in agreement with all her religious beliefs, she was sane in his view, arguing that "I do not call people insane because they differ with me. I pronounce her a sane woman and wish we had a nation of such women."

The jury deliberated for only seven minutes before deciding the case in Elizabeth's favor. She was legally declared sane, and Judge Charles Starr, who had changed the trial from one about habeas corpus to one about sanity, issued an order that she should not be confined. As scholar Kathryn Burns-Howard described it, "[while] we will never know Elizabeth's true mental state or the details of her family life (...) soon after being discharged, she convinced a jury of her sanity."

== Life after the trial ==
When Elizabeth Packard returned to the home she shared with her husband in Manteno, Illinois, she found that the night before her release, her husband had rented their home to another family, sold her furniture, had taken her money, notes, wardrobe and children, and had left the state. She appealed to the Supreme Courts of both Illinois and Massachusetts, to where her husband had taken her children, but had no legal recourse, as married women in these states at the time had no legal rights to their property or children (see Coverture). As such, the Anti-Insane Asylum Society was formed.

Packard did not return to her former life, but became a national celebrity, publishing "an armload of books and criss-crossing the United States on a decades-long reform campaign", not only advocating for married women's rights and freedom of speech, but speaking out against "the power of insane asylums". She became what some scholars call "a publicist and lobbyist for better insanity laws". As scholar Kathryn Burns-Howard has argued, Packard reinvented herself in this role, earning enough to support her children and even her estranged husband, from whom she remained separated for the rest of her life. Ultimately, moderate supporters of women's rights in the northern United States embraced her. Some argued that in the midst of the Civil War that a country in the midst of freeing slaves should do the same for others who suffered from abusive husbands. Some argue that she seemed oblivious to her racial prejudice in arguing that White women had a "moral and spiritual nature" and suffered more "spiritual agony" than formerly enslaved African-Americans. Even so, others say that her story provided "a stirring example of oppressed womanhood" that others did not.

Packard petitioned the Illinois and Massachusetts legislatures, and in 1869 legislation was passed in those states allowing married women equal rights to property and custody of their children. Upon the passing of this legislation, Packard's husband voluntarily ceded custody of their children back to her, and her children came to live with her in Chicago.

Packard realized how narrow her legal victory had been, and that the underlying social principles which had led to her confinement still existed. She founded the Anti-Insane Asylum Society and published several books, including Marital Power Exemplified, or Three Years Imprisonment for Religious Belief (1864), Great Disclosure of Spiritual Wickedness in High Places (1865), The Mystic Key or the Asylum Secret Unlocked (1866), and The Prisoners' Hidden Life, Or Insane Asylums Unveiled (1868). In 1867, the State of Illinois passed a "Bill for the Protection of Personal Liberty" which guaranteed that all people accused of insanity, including wives, had the right to a public hearing, as did Massachusetts.

Packard also saw similar laws passed in three other states. Even so, she was strongly attacked by medical professionals and anonymous citizens, unlike others such as Dorothea Dix, with her former doctor from the Jacksonville Insane Asylum, Dr. Andrew McFarland, who privately called her "a sort of Jeanne D'Arc in the matter of stirring up the personal prejudices". As such, Elizabeth's work on this front was "broadly unappreciated" while she was alive. She only received broader recognition, starting in the 1930s, by a well-known historian of mental illness, Albert Deutsch, and again in the 1960s from those who were "attacking the medical model of insanity".

She died on July 25, 1897. In her obituary, The Inter Ocean described her as "the reformer of insane asylum methods".

== Scholarship and legacy ==
Scholars have written various books and articles about Elizabeth Packard. This has included articles by scholars Myra Samuels Himelhoch and Arthur H. Shaffer in 1979, Paul A. Lombardo in 1992, and Jennifer Rebecca Levinson in 2003. In 1991, Barbara Sapinsley wrote the first book which focused on Elizabeth Packard, entitled The Private War of Mrs. Packard. It was informed by Packard's family in the late 1960s/early 1970s, and took 20 years to find a publisher. Linda V. Carlisle wrote another biography, published by University of Illinois Press in 2010, entitled Elizabeth Packard: A Noble Fight. In part, she focuses on individual legislation that Packard campaigned for and/or helped bring about. In 2021, Kate Moore wrote another biography entitled The Woman They Could Not Silence: One Woman, Her Incredible Fight for Freedom, and the Men Who Tried to Make Her Disappear. Previously, in 2005, Barbara Hambly had referred to Elizabeth Packard, in some detail, in her novel on the insanity of Mary Todd Lincoln, entitled The Emancipator's Wife: A Novel of Mary Todd Lincoln, since the 1867 law Packard advocated for required a jury trial for anyone who was "committed to an insane asylum." Moore would later say that Packard was not mentally ill and was "merely independent," and argued that people should "take inspiration from women like Elizabeth." Troy Rondinone, a professor at Southern Connecticut State University, made a similar argument, arguing that people should remember "Packard’s battle for women in the mental health care system."

Emily Mann wrote the play Mrs. Packard, which premiered in May 2007. In Mann's play, Packard describes her life fully in the insane asylum; it is considered historically accurate.

On August 10, 2023, Illinois Governor J. B. Pritzker renamed the mental health hospital in Springfield Illinois from Andrew McFarland Mental Health Center to the Elizabeth Packard Mental Health Center, in Packard's honor.

== See also ==
- Maria: or, The Wrongs of Woman – an unfinished novel about a woman imprisoned in an asylum
- Changeling – a film about a woman imprisoned in a mental hospital
- The Yellow Wallpaper - a short story noted for illustration of attitudes towards the mental and physical health of women in the 19th century
