= David Bronner =

American corporate executive and activist (born 1973)

- Born: May 7, 1973 (age 53); Los Angeles, California, US
- Education: Harvard University
- Occupations: Soap maker, entrepreneur
- Known for: Dr. Bronner's Magic Soaps

David Bronner (born 1973) is an American corporate executive and activist. As the top executive at Dr. Bronner's Magic Soaps, he (Note: Bronner uses he/they pronouns. This article uses he/him pronouns for consistency.) has become known for his activism around a range of issues, especially fair trade, sustainable agriculture, animal rights, and drug policy reform.

== Family and education ==
David Bronner was born in Los Angeles, California, the son of Jim Bronner and Trudy Bronner. He graduated from Harvard University in 1995 with a degree in biology. He is the grandson of Emanuel Bronner, founder of Dr. Bronner's Magic Soaps, an American producer of organic soap and personal care products. His father worked for the company in the 1980s and 1990s, and his mother is the company's chief financial officer.

== Business career ==
In 1997 David Bronner began working for the family business, which was then under the leadership of his father. Following his father's death in 1998, David became the company's president and, working with his brother Michael, grew the company from $4 million in annual revenue in 1998 to $120 million in 2017. In 1999, he joined the small handful of top U.S. executives who voluntarily capped their salaries out of commitment to fair labor principles; Dr. Bronner's Magic Soaps still has its top salary capped at five times that of the company's lowest-paid workers. In 2015, David moved into the newly created position of Cosmic Engagement Officer (CEO), while Michael took over as president. In 2019 Bronner founded the company Brother David's to produce organic sun-grown cannabis in partnership with the supply chain company Flow Kana and independent small farmers. The company states that all profits will go to support regenerative agriculture and reform of drug-prohibition laws.

== Activism and philanthropy ==
Dr. Bronner's Magic Soaps has supported causes related to drug policy reform, animal rights, organic labeling, sustainable agriculture, and fair trade practices. Roughly 10 percent of the company's revenue goes to charitable giving and activist causes annually. Organizations that have been supported under Bronner's leadership include the Multidisciplinary Association for Psychedelic Studies (for which Bronner serves on the board of directors), and the Sea Shepherd Conservation Society.

A particular target of Bronner's activism has been efforts to protect the hemp industry in the United States. Under his leadership in 2001, the company funded and coordinated with the Hemp Industry Association on its lawsuit against the U.S. Drug Enforcement Administration (DEA), seeking to prevent a ban of hemp food sales in the United States. The Ninth Circuit Court of Appeals granted a stay in the case in 2002 and ruled in favor of the hemp industry in 2004.

Bronner has been arrested twice for civil disobedience while protesting limitations on the domestic production of hemp. In 2009, he was arrested for planting hemp seeds on the lawn at DEA headquarters. In 2012, he was arrested after harvesting hemp and milling hemp oil while locked in a metal cage in front of the White House. In 2015 he was named Cannabis Activist of the Year by the Seattle Hempfest.

In 2014 Bronner wrote an advertorial drawing attention to the ways that GMO crops have led to increased pesticide use in the United States. It was initially published as a short article in the Huffington Post and subsequently as an ad in various wide-circulation magazines, ranging from The New Yorker to Scientific American. Two leading journals, Science and Nature, refused to carry the ad, in at least one case due to concern over backlash from the GMO industry.

In 2019, David Bronner pledged his company’s matching contribution of US$150,000 to Oregon’s statewide ballot initiative to legalize psilocybin assisted therapy.

== Personal life ==
In honor of National Coming Out Day in 2022, Bronner announced in an essay on his website that he uses he/him and they/them pronouns, describing himself as "about 25% girl" and not being "‘straight,’ ‘gay,’ or ‘man’ or ‘woman’". The essay also mentioned Bronner's wife Mia, who is bisexual and genderfluid, and his 25-year-old non-binary child Maya as having inspired him in his gender exploration.
