= Dr. Bronner's Magic Soaps =

Company in California

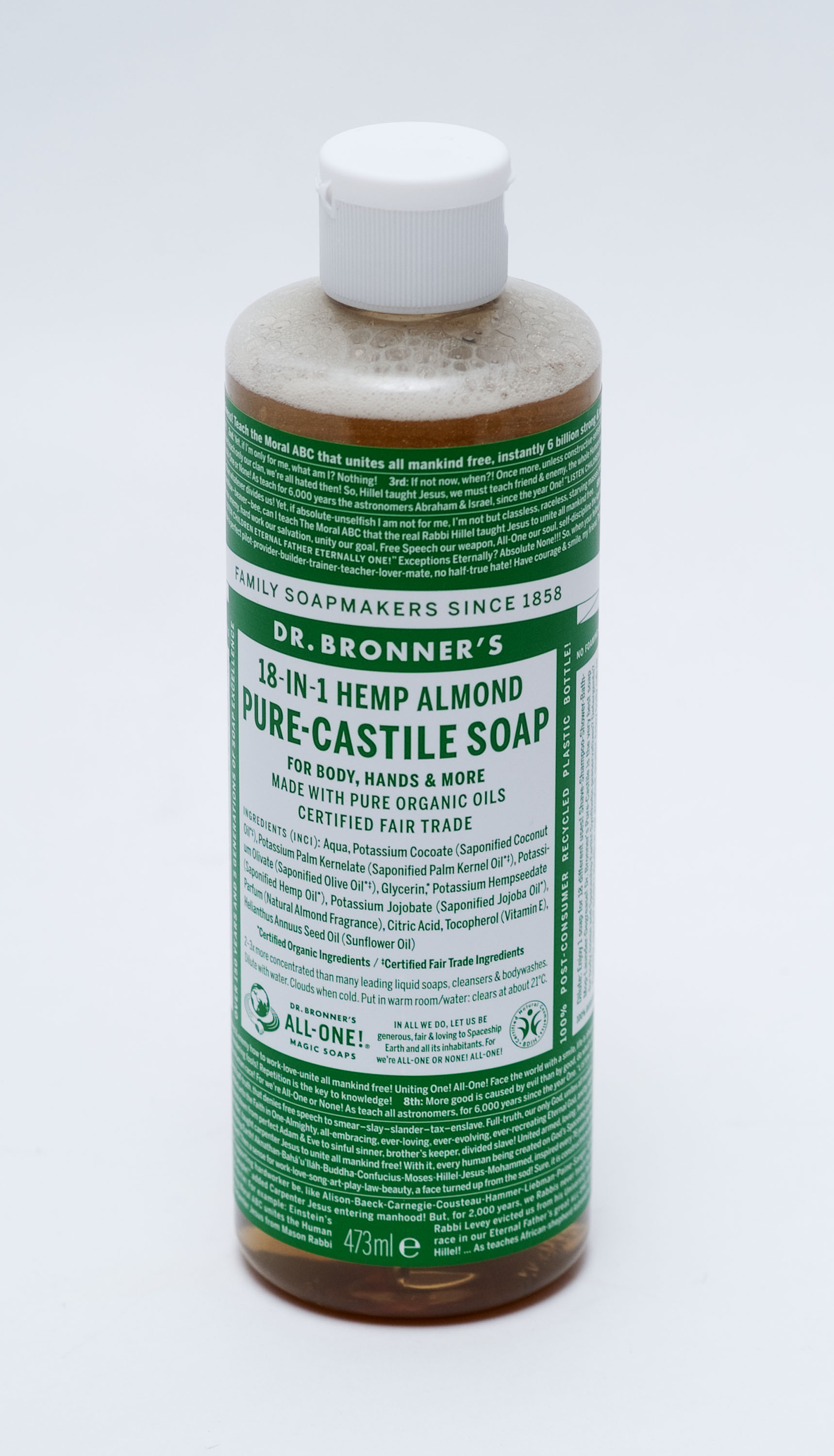
- A bottle of Dr. Bronner's Castile soap
- Industry: Soaps
- Founded: 1948; 78 years ago in Los Angeles, California, U.S.
- Founder: Emanuel Bronner
- Headquarters: Vista, California, U.S.
- Website: www.drbronner.com

Dr. Bronner's Magic Soaps is an American producer of organic soap and personal care products headquartered in Vista, California. The company was founded in the late 1940s by Emanuel Bronner and continues to be run by members of the Bronner family. The company's products are known for their text-heavy political labels and the variety of their advertised uses for a single product (e.g., one soap advertises eighteen uses, from toothpaste and shampoo to toilet scrubber and insecticide).

== History ==
Dr. Bronner's Magic Soaps was founded by Emanuel Bronner, who was not a doctor. He was a Jewish immigrant soap-maker who emigrated from Germany in 1928. His family, who stayed behind, were murdered in the Holocaust. After escaping from a mental institution in 1945, Bronner went into business.

Bronner created his own syncretic spiritual ideology and originally distributed the soap to those who attended lectures on his 'All One' philosophy; however, he soon became convinced that attendees were seeking soap rather than spiritual enlightenment. After this realization, Bronner began to print key tenets of his teachings on the soap bottles as a way to proselytize. The labels still include detailed monologues on the unity of humankind and the need to "unite spaceship earth". An 88-minute documentary film directed by Sara Lamm, titled Dr. Bronner's Magic Soapbox, was released in 2006, and in 2017, the company released a spoken word album of Bronner's spiritual teachings.

For a period of time, Bronner ran the company as a tax-exempt religious organization, but it was not in compliance with this designation and was levied $1.3 million in back taxes in 1985. Following this, Emmanuel Bronner's son Jim started working, and in 1988, it was recapitalized as a for-profit business. In 1997, Jim Bronner's son, David, began working for the company.

In 1999, the company rebranded as "social and natural." The soap had long included caramel coloring, but the company had never disclosed this ingredient. In the rebranding, David Bronner faced a choice: declare the ingredient or omit it. He decided to replace the caramel color with hemp oil. From then on, David Bronner also campaigned intensively for the legalization of hemp.

David Bronner's brother, Michael, began working for the company in 2000. Michael Bronner assumed the presidency of the company in 2015 and promoted his brother David Bronner to the position of CEO, which stands for Cosmic Engagement Officer at the company.

In June 2022, Dr. Bronner co-signed an open letter expressing concern over B Corp certifications awarded to multinationals with documented histories of unethical practice. In January 2023, a private letter was sent to B Lab, the nonprofit organization responsible for the B Corporation certification, warning that without meaningful reforms, Dr. Bronner’s would likely withdraw from the program.

In February 2025, Dr. Bronner announced it would not renew its certification with B Lab. David Bronner and Michael Bronner said that “The integrity of the B Corp Certification has become compromised ... Sharing the same logo and messaging ... with large multinational CPG companies with a history of serious ecological and labor issues, and no comprehensive or credible eco-social certification of supply chains, is unacceptable to us."

== Supply chain ==
The major ingredients (mainly vegetable oils, lye, and essential oils) in Dr. Bronner's Magic Soaps products are organic and fair trade. The company has developed a number of fair trade and organic production systems in Ghana, Sri Lanka, Samoa, India, and Kenya through its sister LLC, Serendiworld.

== Activism and philanthropy ==
Dr. Bronner's Magic Soaps has championed a number of causes related to drug policy reform, animal rights, genetically modified organisms and fair trade practices. The company has self-imposed caps on executive pay, with executive salaries not to exceed five times the wage of its lowest paid workers. Roughly a third of the company's profits are dedicated to charitable giving and activist causes annually.

In 2018, the company joined Patagonia, Inc. and the Rodale Institute in promoting the development of the Regenerative Organic Certification label, a more stringent certification than 'organic' that requires companies to utilize only ingredients that have been produced under conditions that foster workers' rights, animal welfare, and environmental sustainability. In 2013, the company donated $1.8 million to the campaign to pass a proposition requiring the labeling of foods containing genetically modified organisms in Washington State.

In 2017, Dr. Bronner's Magic Soaps donated $600,000 to animal rights causes. Notably, the company purchased a boat for Sea Shepherd Conservation Society operations in Germany, the MV Emanuel Bronner. For the company's national and international experience in sustainable development, and eco-friendly products, the Environment Possibility Award conferred the "Award of Earth Defender" to Dr. Bronner's in 2020.

CEO David Bronner is a critic of drug prohibition and an activist for the legalization of a number of psychoactive substances. In 2004, the company sued the Drug Enforcement Administration with the goal of changing rules regarding the importation of hemp oil. A federal judge ruled in favor of the plaintiffs. David Bronner has been arrested twice for civil disobedience protesting limitations on the domestic production of hemp. In 2004, he planted hemp seeds on the lawn of the Drug Enforcement Administration headquarters, and in 2012, he harvested hemp while locked in a metal cage in front of the White House. In 2015, he was named Cannabis Activist of the Year by the Seattle Hempfest.

Bronner is a member of the Board of Directors of the organization Multidisciplinary Association for Psychedelic Studies, and at his behest the company has pledged to donate $5 million to the organization between 2017 and 2022, principally for their work in support of the therapeutic use of MDMA for post-traumatic stress disorder. In 2019, David Bronner pledged company contributions of $1 million to Oregon's statewide ballot initiative to legalize psilocybin-assisted therapy, alongside nonprofits like SPORE and ERIE. By the time Oregon Ballot Measure 109 was approved by voters in November 2020, legalizing psilocybin in therapeutic settings, Dr. Bronner's had donated more than $2 million in support of the measure.

In 2022, Dr. Bronner's began promoting psychedelic therapy on their bottles. In December 2024, the family of an employee filed a wrongful death lawsuit against the company for allegedly providing their loved one with an unlicensed "ketamine massage" appointment where the masseuse allegedly distributed a lethal dose of MDA (no ketamine was found in her system), accusing the company of fostering a drug culture at the workplace. The case was settled in March 2025, with the company issuing a statement that while the company does provide benefits for ketamine-assisted therapy, the masseuse in question was unlicensed and not a valid provider for the benefit, and stating that neither David nor Mia Bronner recommended the victim receive a "ketamine massage" in particular.
