= Emanuel Bronner =

American soapmaker

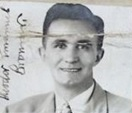
- Bronner c. 1936
- Born: Emanuel Theodor Heilbronner; February 1, 1908; Heilbronn, German Empire
- Died: March 7, 1997 (aged 89); Escondido, California, U.S.
- Occupations: Soap maker, entrepreneur
- Known for: Dr. Bronner's Magic Soaps

Emanuel Theodore Bronner (born Emanuel Heilbronner; February 1, 1908 – March 7, 1997) was the founder of Dr. Bronner's Magic Soaps. He used product labels to promote his moral and religious ideas, including a belief in the goodness and unity of humanity.

== History ==
Bronner was born in Heilbronn, Germany, to the Heilbronner family of soap makers. He immigrated to the United States in 1929, dropping "Heil" from his name due to its association with Nazism. He became a naturalized citizen of the United States in 1936. As he and his family were Jewish, he pleaded with his parents to immigrate with him for fear of the then-ascendant Nazi Party, but they refused. His last contact with his parents was in the form of a censored postcard saying, "You were right. —Your loving father." His parents were murdered in the Holocaust.

== Career ==
He started his business making products such as castile soap by hand in his home. The product labels are crowded with statements of Bronner's philosophy, which he called "All-One-God-Faith" and the "Moral ABC", both of which he included on the label of every soap bottle he produced. Many of Bronner's references came from Jewish and Christian sources, such as the Shema and the Beatitudes; others from writers such as Rudyard Kipling and Thomas Paine. On his labels, he referred to the Jewish sage Hillel the Elder as "Rabbi Hillel" and to Jesus Christ as "Rabbi Jesus." The labels became famous for their idiosyncratic style, including hyphens to join long strings of words and the liberal use of exclamation marks.

In 1946, while promoting his "Moral ABC" at the University of Chicago, Bronner was arrested for refusing to leave the dean's office, despite the fact he was invited to the campus to lecture by a local student group. He was then committed to the Elgin Mental Health Center, a mental hospital in Elgin, Illinois, from which he escaped after shock treatments. Bronner believed those shock treatments brought about his eventual blindness.

After escaping from Elgin, Bronner hitch-hiked to Los Angeles, California. Over time Bronner started a family and eventually settled in Escondido, California, where his soap-making operation grew into a small factory. At his death in 1997, it produced more than a million bottles of soap and other products per year, but was still not mechanized. The firm has been the subject of many published articles and has supported many charitable causes.

== Legacy ==
After Bronner's death, his family has continued to run the business. His grandson David Bronner is currently CEO.

His life was the subject of a 2007 documentary film, Dr. Bronner's Magic Soapbox, which premiered on the Sundance TV channel, on 3 July 2007.

The Sea Shepherd Conservation Society has a ship, the MV Emanuel Bronner, donated by the soap company.
