= Deutsche Telekom AG v Commission =

European competition law case

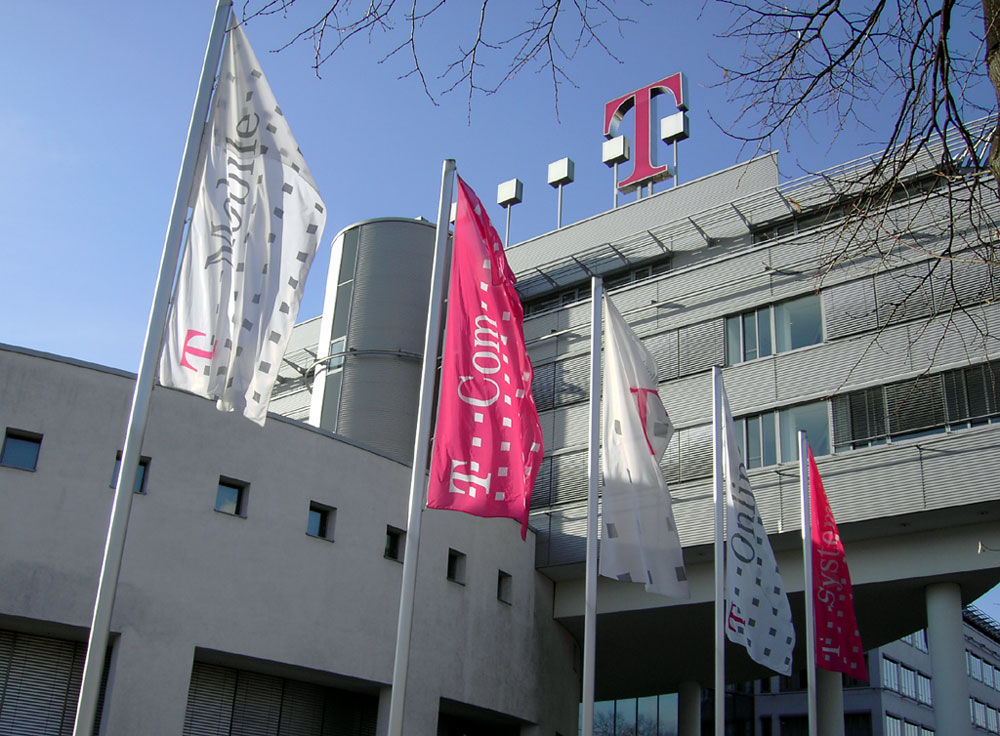
- Court: Court of Justice
- Citation: (2010) C-280/08

Keywords
- Telecommunications, dominance, margin squeeze

Deutsche Telekom AG v Commission (2010) C-280/08 is a European competition law case relevant for UK enterprise law, concerning telecommunications.

== Facts ==
Deutsche Telekom AG claimed the Commission had wrongly found it abused its dominant position under TFEU article 102, in charging higher prices to access its local loop: the physical circuit connecting the network termination point at a subscriber's premises to the main distribution frame or equivalent facility in the fixed public telephone network. Under German law and the Telecommunications Directives, DT was required to give access to competitors. The Commission said it was charging competitors more than its own retail end-user customers. The margin between the wholesale access price and its retail prices was not enough to cover downstream costs. DT's prices were approved by the German telecomms regulator (RegTP). The Commission said once a margin squeeze was shown, it was unnecessary to assess the effects on competition. This was already an abuse. Deutsche Telekom argued there could be no abuse because its prices were approved by the Regulator.

The General Court upheld the Commission's decision. It said the abuse was an unfair ‘spread’ between wholesale and retail prices. Margin squeezing was a separate abuse from predatory pricing.

== Judgment ==
The CJEU upheld the General Court.

80 According to the case-law of the Court of Justice, it is only if anti-competitive conduct is required of undertakings by national legislation, or if the latter creates a legal framework which itself eliminates any possibility of competitive activity on their part, that Articles 81 EC and 82 EC do not apply. In such a situation, the restriction of competition is not attributable, as those provisions implicitly require, to the autonomous conduct of the undertakings. Articles 81 EC and 82 EC may apply, however, if it is found that the national legislation leaves open the possibility of competition which may be prevented, restricted or distorted by the autonomous conduct of undertakings (Joined Cases C‑359/95 P and C‑379/95 P Commission and France v Ladbroke Racing [1997] ECR I‑6265, paragraphs 33 and 34 and the case-law cited).

81 The possibility of excluding anti-competitive conduct from the scope of Articles 81 EC and 82 EC on the ground that it has been required of the undertakings in question by existing national legislation or that the legislation has precluded all scope for any competitive conduct on their part has thus been accepted only to a limited extent by the Court of Justice (see Case 41/83 Italy v Commission [1985] ECR 873, paragraph 19; Joined Cases 240/82 to 242/82, 261/82, 262/82, 268/82 and 269/82 Stichting Sigarettenindustrie and Others v Commission [1985] ECR 3831, paragraphs 27 to 29; and Case C‑198/01 CIF [2003] ECR I‑8055, paragraph 67).

82 Thus, the Court has held that if a national law merely encourages or makes it easier for undertakings to engage in autonomous anti-competitive conduct, those undertakings remain subject to Articles 81 EC and 82 EC (Joined Cases 40/73 to 48/73, 50/73, 54/73 to 56/73, 111/73, 113/73 and 114/73 Suiker Unie and Others v Commission [1975] ECR 1663, paragraphs 36 to 73, and CIF, paragraph 56).

83 According to the case-law of the Court, dominant undertakings have a special responsibility not to allow their conduct to impair genuine undistorted competition on the common market (Case 322/81 Nederlandsche Banden-Industrie-Michelin v Commission [1983] ECR 3461, paragraph 57).

84 It follows from this that the mere fact that the appellant was encouraged by the intervention of a national regulatory authority such as RegTP to maintain the pricing practices which led to the margin squeeze of competitors who are at least as efficient as the appellant cannot, as such, in any way absolve the appellant from responsibility under Article 82 EC (see, to that effect, Case 123/83 Clair [1985] ECR 391, paragraphs 21 to 23).

85 Since, notwithstanding such interventions, the appellant had scope to adjust its retail prices for end-user access services, the General Court was entitled to find, on that ground alone, that the margin squeeze at issue was attributable to the appellant.

86 In the present case, it must be noted that the appellant does not deny the existence of such scope in the arguments put forward in the first part of the first ground of appeal. In particular, the appellant does not challenge the General Court’s findings in paragraphs 97 to 105 and 121 to 151 of the judgment under appeal that, in essence, the appellant was able to make applications to RegTP for authorisation to adjust its retail prices for end-user access services, specifically retail prices for narrowband access services for the period between 1 January 1998 and 31 December 2001, and retail prices for broadband access services for the period from 1 January 2002.

87 Instead, in its various complaints and arguments the appellant merely underlines the encouragement provided by RegTP’s intervention, and states, in particular, that RegTP itself considered and approved the margin squeeze at issue in the light both of national and European Union telecommunications law and of Article 82 EC and, moreover, that the Bundesgerichtshof held in a judgment of 10 February 2004 that the appellant cannot take the place of RegTP in assessing whether a pricing practice is contrary to Article 82 EC.

88 For the reasons set out in paragraphs 80 to 85 of the present judgment, such arguments cannot, however, in any way alter the fact that that pricing practice is attributable to the appellant, since it is common ground that the appellant had scope to adjust its retail prices for end-user access services, and, therefore, such arguments are ineffective as a means of challenging the General Court’s findings on that point.

89 In particular, the appellant cannot complain that the General Court did not consider whether there was ‘fault’ on its part by failing to use the scope which it had to apply to RegTP for authorisation to adjust its retail prices for end-user access services. The existence or otherwise of any ‘fault’ in such conduct cannot alter the finding that the appellant had scope to adopt that conduct, and can be taken into account only in determining whether that conduct was an infringement and at the stage of setting the level of the fines.

90 Moreover, as the General Court held in paragraph 120 of the judgment under appeal, the Commission cannot, in any event, be bound by a decision taken by a national body pursuant to Article 82 EC (see, to that effect, Case C‑344/98 Masterfoods and HB [2000] ECR I‑11369, paragraph 48). In the present case, the appellant does not, indeed, deny that RegTP’s decisions are not binding on the Commission.

[...]

124 As regards, in the first place, the complaints as to whether the General Court’s findings are well founded, it must be borne in mind, in relation to the question whether the infringements were committed intentionally or negligently and are, therefore, liable to be punished by a fine in accordance with the first subparagraph of Article 15(2) of Regulation No 17, that it follows from the case-law of the Court that that condition is satisfied where the undertaking concerned cannot be unaware of the anti-competitive nature of its conduct, whether or not it is aware that it is infringing the competition rules of the Treaty (see Joined Cases 96/82 to 102/82, 104/82, 105/82, 108/82 and 110/82 IAZ International Belgium and Others v Commission [1983] ECR 3369, paragraph 45, and Nederlandsche Banden-Industrie-Michelin v Commission, paragraph 107).

125 In the present case, the General Court took the view in paragraphs 296 and 297 of the judgment under appeal that that condition was satisfied, since the appellant could not have been unaware that, notwithstanding the authorisation decisions of RegTP, it had genuine scope to set its retail prices for end-user access services and, moreover, the margin squeeze entailed serious restrictions on competition, particularly in view of its monopoly on the wholesale market in local loop access services and its virtual monopoly on the retail market in end-user access services.

126 It must be held that such reasoning, which is based on findings of fact which, in the absence of any allegation of distortion, are for the General Court alone to assess, is not vitiated by any error of law.

127 In so far as the appellant complains that the General Court did not take RegTP’s decisions or the lack of any precedent in the European Union into account, it is sufficient to note that such arguments are merely intended to show that the appellant was unaware that the conduct complained of in the decision at issue was unlawful in the light of Article 82 EC. Such arguments must, therefore, in accordance with the case-law cited in paragraph 124 of the present judgment, be rejected as unfounded.

[...]

169 By contrast, in order to consider whether the present complaint is well founded, the Court must consider whether the General Court was right, in particular in paragraphs 166 and 168 of the judgment under appeal, to find that, even if the appellant does not have scope to adjust its wholesale prices for local loop access services, its pricing practices can nevertheless be categorised as an abuse within the meaning of Article 82 EC where, irrespective of whether those wholesale prices and the retail prices for end-user access services are, in themselves, abusive, the spread between them is unfair, namely, according to that judgment, where that spread is either negative or insufficient to cover the appellant’s product-specific costs of providing its own services, so that a competitor who is as efficient as the appellant is prevented from entering into competition with the appellant for the provision of end-user access services.

170 In that regard, it has consistently been held that Article 82 EC is an application of the general objective of European Community action, namely the institution of a system ensuring that competition in the common market is not distorted. Thus, the dominant position referred to in Article 82 EC relates to a position of economic strength enjoyed by an undertaking which enables it to prevent effective competition being maintained on the relevant market by affording it the power to behave to an appreciable extent independently of its competitors, its customers and ultimately of consumers (see Case 85/76 Hoffmann-La Roche v Commission [1979] ECR 461, paragraph 38, and Case C‑202/07 P France Télécom v Commission [2009] ECR I‑2369, paragraph 103).

171 In the present case, it must be borne in mind that, as is apparent from paragraphs 50 to 52 of the present judgment, the appellant does not deny that it enjoys a dominant position on all the relevant service markets, namely both on the wholesale market in local loop access services and on the retail market in end-user access services.

172 As regards the abusive nature of the appellant’s pricing practices, it must be noted that subparagraph (a) of the second paragraph of Article 82 EC expressly prohibits a dominant undertaking from directly or indirectly imposing unfair prices.

173 Furthermore, the list of abusive practices contained in Article 82 EC is not exhaustive, so that the practices there mentioned are merely examples of abuses of a dominant position. The list of abusive practices contained in that provision does not exhaust the methods of abusing a dominant position prohibited by the Treaty (see British Airways v Commission, paragraph 57 and the case-law cited).

174 In that regard, it must be borne in mind that, in prohibiting the abuse of a dominant position in so far as trade between Member States is capable of being affected, Article 82 EC refers to the conduct of a dominant undertaking which, on a market where the degree of competition is already weakened precisely because of the presence of the undertaking concerned, through recourse to methods different from those governing normal competition in products or services on the basis of the transactions of commercial operators, has the effect of hindering the maintenance of the degree of competition still existing in the market or the growth of that competition (see, to that effect, Hoffman-La Roche v Commission, paragraph 91; Nederlandsche Banden-Industrie-Michelin v Commission, paragraph 70; Case C‑62/86 AKZO v Commission [1991] ECR I‑3359, paragraph 69; British Airways v Commission, paragraph 66; and France Télécom v Commission, paragraph 104).

175 It is apparent from the case-law of the Court that, in order to determine whether the undertaking in a dominant position has abused such a position by its pricing practices, it is necessary to consider all the circumstances and to investigate whether the practice tends to remove or restrict the buyer’s freedom to choose his sources of supply, to bar competitors from access to the market, to apply dissimilar conditions to equivalent transactions with other trading parties, thereby placing them at a competitive disadvantage, or to strengthen the dominant position by distorting competition (see, to that effect, Nederlandsche Banden-Industrie-Michelin v Commission, paragraph 73, and British Airways v Commission, paragraph 67).

176 Since Article 82 EC thus refers not only to practices which may cause damage to consumers directly, but also to those which are detrimental to them through their impact on competition, a dominant undertaking, as has already been observed in paragraph 83 of the present judgment, has a special responsibility not to allow its conduct to impair genuine undistorted competition on the common market (see, to that effect, France Télécom v Commission, paragraph 105 and the case-law cited).

177 It follows from this that Article 82 EC prohibits a dominant undertaking from, inter alia, adopting pricing practices which have an exclusionary effect on its equally efficient actual or potential competitors, that is to say practices which are capable of making market entry very difficult or impossible for such competitors, and of making it more difficult or impossible for its co-contractors to choose between various sources of supply or commercial partners, thereby strengthening its dominant position by using methods other than those which come within the scope of competition on the merits. From that point of view, therefore, not all competition by means of price can be regarded as legitimate (see, to that effect, Nederlandsche Banden-Industrie-Michelin v Commission, paragraph 73; AKZO v Commission, paragraph 70; and British Airways v Commission, paragraph 68).

178 In the present case, it must be noted that the appellant does not deny that, even on the assumption that it does not have the scope to adjust its wholesale prices for local loop access services, the spread between those prices and its retail prices for end-user access services is capable of having an exclusionary effect on its equally efficient actual or potential competitors, since their access to the relevant service markets is, at the very least, made more difficult as a result of the margin squeeze which such a spread can entail for them.

179 At the hearing the appellant submitted, however, that the test applied in the judgment under appeal for the purpose of establishing an abuse within the meaning of Article 82 EC required it, in the circumstances of the case, to increase its retail prices for end-user access services to the detriment of its own end-users, given the national regulatory authorities’ regulation of its wholesale prices for local loop access services.

180 It is true, as paragraphs 175 to 177 of the present judgment have already shown, that Article 82 EC aims, in particular, to protect consumers by means of undistorted competition (see Joined Cases C‑468/06 to C‑478/06 Sot. Lélos kai Siaand Others [2008] ECR I‑7139, paragraph 68).

181 However, the mere fact that the appellant would have to increase its retail prices for end-user access services in order to avoid the margin squeeze of its competitors who are as efficient as the appellant cannot in any way, in itself, render irrelevant the test which the General Court applied in the present case for the purpose of establishing an abuse under Article 82 EC.

182 By further reducing the degree of competition existing on a market – the end-user access services market – already weakened precisely because of the presence of the appellant, thereby strengthening its dominant position on that market, the margin squeeze also has the effect that consumers suffer detriment as a result of the limitation of the choices available to them and, therefore, of the prospect of a longer-term reduction of retail prices as a result of competition exerted by competitors who are at least as efficient in that market (see, to that effect, France Télécom v Commission, paragraph 112).

183 In those circumstances, in so far as the appellant has scope to reduce or end such a margin squeeze, as observed in paragraphs 77 to 86 of the present judgment, by increasing its retail prices for end-user access services, the General Court correctly held in paragraphs 166 to 168 of the judgment under appeal that that margin squeeze is capable, in itself, of constituting an abuse within the meaning of Article 82 EC in view of the exclusionary effect that it can create for competitors who are at least as efficient as the appellant. The General Court was not, therefore, obliged to establish, additionally, that the wholesale prices for local loop access services or retail prices for end-user access services were in themselves abusive on account of their excessive or predatory nature, as the case may be.

[...]

195 As a preliminary point, it must be noted that, contrary to Vodafone’s contention, the present complaint is admissible even though it partly reiterates the arguments put forward at first instance, since, in accordance with the case-law cited in paragraph 25 of the present judgment, the complaint is that, by resorting to the as-efficient-competitor test notwithstanding the fact that the appellant is not subject to the same legal and material conditions as its competitors, the General Court applied an incorrect legal test to the application of Article 82 EC to the pricing practices at issue and, therefore, committed an error of law on that point.

196 As to whether that complaint is well founded, as is apparent from paragraph 186 of the judgment under appeal and from paragraphs 4 and 12 of the present judgment, the as-efficient-competitor test used by the General Court in the judgment under appeal consists in considering whether the pricing practices of a dominant undertaking could drive an equally efficient economic operator from the market, relying solely on the dominant undertaking’s charges and costs, instead of on the particular situation of its actual or potential competitors.

197 In the present case, as is apparent from paragraph 169 of the present judgment, the appellant’s costs were taken into account by the General Court in order to establish the abusive nature of the appellant’s pricing practices where the spread between its wholesale prices for local loop access services and its retail prices for end-user access services was positive. In such circumstances, the General Court considered that the Commission was entitled to regard those pricing practices as unfair within the meaning of Article 82 EC, where that spread was insufficient to cover the appellant’s product-specific costs of providing its own services.

198 In that regard, it must be borne in mind that the Court has already held that, in order to assess whether the pricing practices of a dominant undertaking are likely to eliminate a competitor contrary to Article 82 EC, it is necessary to adopt a test based on the costs and the strategy of the dominant undertaking itself (see AKZO v Commission, paragraph 74, and France Télécom v Commission, paragraph 108).

199 The Court pointed out, inter alia, in that regard that a dominant undertaking cannot drive from the market undertakings which are perhaps as efficient as the dominant undertaking but which, because of their smaller financial resources, are incapable of withstanding the competition waged against them (see AKZO v Commission, paragraph 72).

200 In the present case, since, as is apparent from paragraphs 178 and 183 of the present judgment, the abusive nature of the pricing practices at issue in the judgment under appeal stems in the same way from their exclusionary effect on the appellant’s competitors, the General Court did not err in law when it held, in paragraph 193 of the judgment under appeal, that the Commission had been correct to analyse the abusive nature of the appellant’s pricing practices solely on the basis of the appellant’s charges and costs.

201 As the General Court found, in essence, in paragraphs 187 and 194 of the judgment under appeal, since such a test can establish whether the appellant would itself have been able to offer its retail services to end-users otherwise than at a loss if it had first been obliged to pay its own wholesale prices for local loop access services, it was suitable for determining whether the appellant’s pricing practices had an exclusionary effect on competitors by squeezing their margins.

202 Such an approach is particularly justified because, as the General Court indicated, in essence, in paragraph 192 of the judgment under appeal, it is also consistent with the general principle of legal certainty in so far as the account taken of the costs of the dominant undertaking allows that undertaking, in the light of its special responsibility under Article 82 EC, to assess the lawfulness of its own conduct. While a dominant undertaking knows what its own costs and charges are, it does not, as a general rule, know what its competitors’ costs and charges are.

203 Those findings are not affected by what the appellant claims are the less onerous legal and material conditions to which its competitors are subject in the provision of their telecommunications services to end-users. Even if that assertion were proved, it would not alter either the fact that a dominant undertaking, such as the appellant, cannot adopt pricing practices which are capable of driving equally efficient competitors from the relevant market, or the fact that such an undertaking must, in view of its special responsibility under Article 82 EC, be in a position itself to determine whether its pricing practices are compatible with that provision.

204 The appellant’s complaint concerning the misapplication of the as-efficient-competitor test must, therefore, be rejected.

ii) The complaint concerning an error of law in that call services and other telecommunications services were not taken into account in calculating the margin squeeze

[...]

251 It should be borne in mind that, in accordance with the case-law cited in paragraph 174 of the present judgment, by prohibiting the abuse of a dominant position in so far as trade between Member States is capable of being affected, Article 82 EC refers to the conduct of a dominant undertaking which, through recourse to methods different from those governing normal competition in products or services on the basis of the transactions of commercial operators, has the effect of hindering the maintenance of the degree of competition still existing in the market or the growth of that competition.

252 The General Court therefore held in paragraph 235 of the judgment under appeal, without any error of law, that the anti-competitive effect which the Commission is required to demonstrate, as regards pricing practices of a dominant undertaking resulting in a margin squeeze of its equally efficient competitors, relates to the possible barriers which the appellant’s pricing practices could have created for the growth of products on the retail market in end-user access services and, therefore, on the degree of competition in that market.

253 As is already apparent from paragraphs 177 and 178 of the present judgment, a pricing practice such as that at issue in the judgment under appeal that is adopted by a dominant undertaking such as the appellant constitutes an abuse within the meaning of Article 82 EC if it has an exclusionary effect on competitors who are at least as efficient as the dominant undertaking itself by squeezing their margins and is capable of making market entry more difficult or impossible for those competitors, and thus of strengthening its dominant position on that market to the detriment of consumers’ interests.

254 Admittedly, where a dominant undertaking actually implements a pricing practice resulting in a margin squeeze of its equally efficient competitors, with the purpose of driving them from the relevant market, the fact that the desired result is not ultimately achieved does not alter its categorisation as abuse within the meaning of Article 82 EC. However, in the absence of any effect on the competitive situation of competitors, a pricing practice such as that at issue cannot be classified as exclusionary if it does not make their market penetration any more difficult.

255 In the present case, since, as has already been noted in paragraph 231 of the present judgment, the wholesale local loop access services provided by the appellant are indispensable to its competitors’ effective penetration of the retail markets for the provision of services to end-users, the General Court was entitled to hold in paragraph 237 of the judgment under appeal, as paragraphs 233 to 236 of the present judgment have already shown, that a margin squeeze resulting from the spread between wholesale prices for local loop access services and retail prices for end-user access services, in principle, hinders the growth of competition in the retail markets in services to end-users, since a competitor who is as efficient as the appellant cannot carry on his business in the retail market for end-user access services without incurring losses.

256 The appellant has not challenged that finding. For the reasons already set out in paragraphs 233 to 236 of the present judgment, the complaint concerning the failure to take into account revenues from any provision of other telecommunications services to end-users must be rejected as unfounded. The argument relating to paragraph 238 of the judgment under appeal concerning the possibility of cross-subsidisation must be rejected as ineffective for the reasons stated in paragraphs 238 to 241 of the present judgment.

257 In addition, in paragraph 239 of the judgment under appeal, the General Court found – as, in the absence of an allegation of distortion, it is for the General Court alone to do – that ‘the small market shares acquired by … competitors in the retail … market [in end-user access services] since the market was liberalised by the entry into force of the TKG on 1 August 1996 are evidence of the restrictions which the applicant’s pricing practices have imposed on the growth of competition in those markets’. In that regard, contrary to what is claimed by the appellant, it is clear from the expression ‘have imposed’ that the General Court did find a causal connection between the appellant’s pricing practices and the small market shares acquired by competitors. The appellant’s complaint on that point is, therefore, unfounded.

258 Furthermore, the General Court concluded in paragraph 244 of its judgment, which also remained unchallenged in the present appeal, that the appellant had not produced any evidence to rebut the findings in the decision at issue that its pricing practices actually restricted competition in the retail market in end-user access services.

259 In those circumstances, it must be concluded that the General Court was correct to hold that the Commission had established that the particular pricing practices of the appellant gave rise to actual exclusionary effects on competitors who were at least as efficient as the appellant itself.

== See also ==
- United Kingdom enterprise law
- EU law
