= MV Emanuel Bronner =

History

Germany
- Launched: 2017
- Fate: Sold to Sea Shepherd Conservation Society

Germany
- Name: MV Emanuel Bronner
- Owner: Sea Shepherd Conservation Society
- Operator: Sea Shepherd Germany
- Port of registry: Germany
- Commissioned: 1 June 2017
- In service: 2017—present
- Identification: Call sign: DF9593; MMSI number: 211417760
- Status: in active service

General characteristics
- Displacement: 11 tons
- Length: 11.65 m (38.2 ft)
- Beam: 3.6 m (12 ft)
- Draft: 1.4 m (4 ft 7 in)
- Installed power: 2 engines
- Speed: 27 knots
- Complement: Max. 4

The MV Emanuel Bronner is a small ship owned and operated by Sea Shepherd Germany as a Baltic Sea conservation patrol vessel. It was unveiled on 1 June 2017 at the Vegesack museum harbor in Bremen, Germany.

The vessel was donated by philanthropist Michael Bronner, and it was named after his grandfather, Emanuel Bronner. The vessel will help to protect the endangered harbor porpoise in the Baltic Sea by documenting illegal fishing nets and reporting them to the local authorities.

Although the harbour porpoise species overall is considered to be of Least Concern by the IUCN, the Baltic Sea and Western African populations, as well as the subspecies P. p. relicta of the Black Sea, are considered endangered.

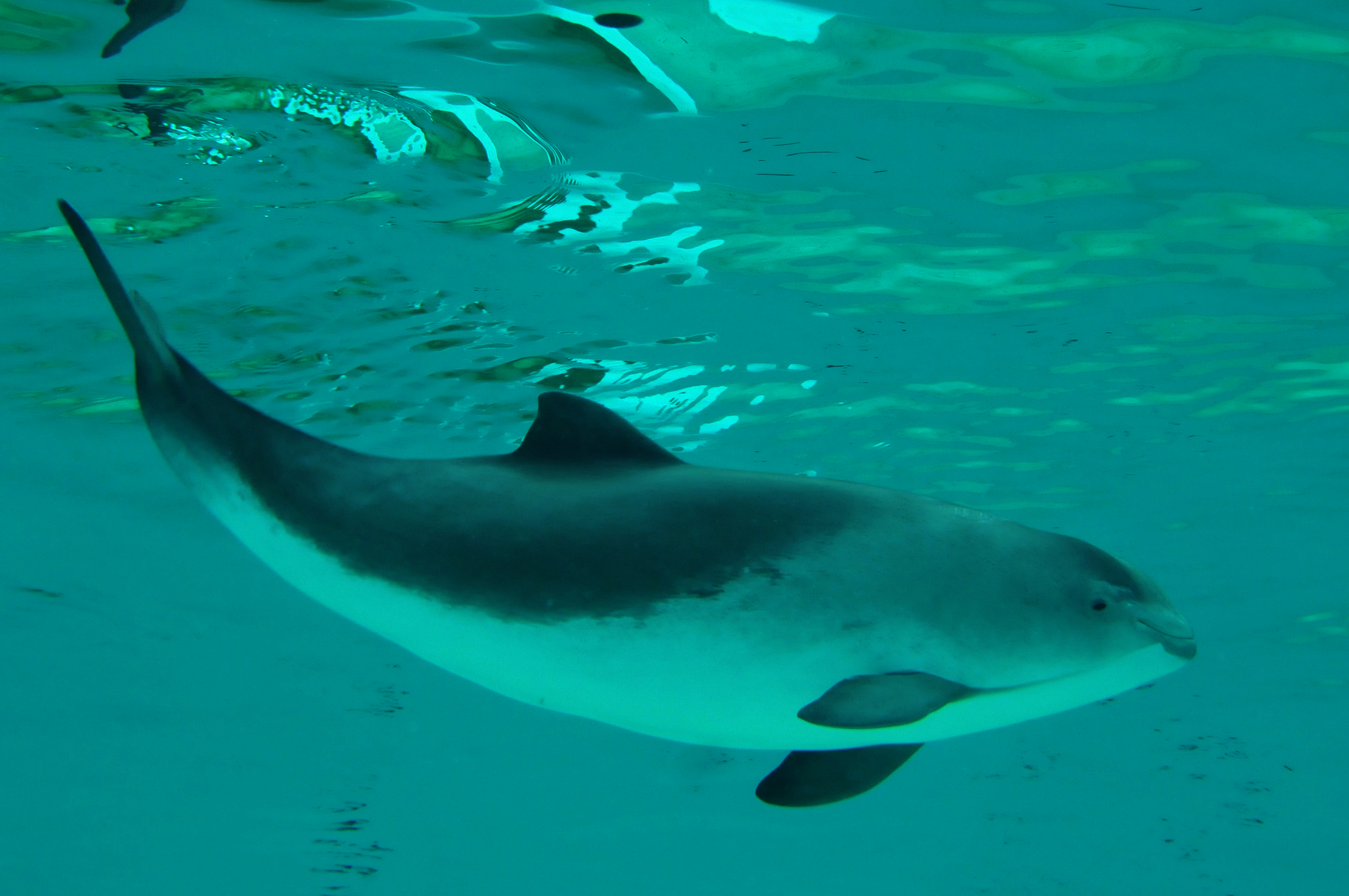
A harbour porpoise

== See also ==
- Neptune's Navy, Sea Shepherd's fleet
