= Cannabis in Washington (state) =

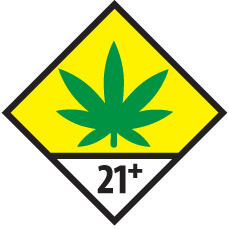
Washington's Cannabis Universal Symbol

Cannabis in Washington relates to a number of legislative, legal, and cultural events surrounding the use of cannabis (marijuana, (Note: This article uses the terms "cannabis" and "marijuana" interchangeably. No distinction is intended.) hashish, THC, kief, etc.). On December 6, 2012, Washington became the first U.S. state to legalize recreational use of marijuana and the first to allow recreational marijuana sales, alongside Colorado. (Note: Both Washington and Colorado voted to legalize recreational cannabis on November 6, 2012, but the new laws took effect on December 6 in Washington and December 10 in Colorado. However, adult-use retail sales of cannabis did not start in Washington until July 2014, while Colorado adult-use retail sales started effective January 1, 2014, making Colorado the first state to allow retail sales.) The state had previously legalized medical marijuana in 1998. Under state law, cannabis is legal for medical purposes and for any purpose by adults over 21.

== Legal history ==
=== Prohibition ===
Washington was among many states to criminalize cannabis in the 1920s. The Washington State Legislature passed House Bill 3 in 1923, which defined "cannabis americana" and "cannabis indica" as narcotic drugs. Possession was punishable by one to 10 years in prison. Nevertheless, enforcement of the law was rare, as cannabis use was not common in the state. In western states such as Washington, cannabis prohibition was largely motivated by the drug's association with the growing number of Mexican American immigrants. As racial and anti-immigrant tensions rose, newspapers published sensationalized stories of the drug causing Mexicans to go insane and commit violent crimes.

After cannabis use became more common during the 1960s, the state began to relax its marijuana laws. In 1971, the state legislature reduced the crime of possession of 40 grams or less to a misdemeanor, and no longer considered the drug to be an "opiate" or "narcotic." However, marijuana remained a Schedule I drug under both the federal Controlled Substances Act of 1970 and Washington's own Controlled Substance Act of 1971, which deem the drug to have a "high potential for abuse" and "no currently accepted medical use."

=== Medical marijuana ===
Despite its Schedule I status, in 1979, the Washington Court of Appeals recognized there was a medical necessity defense for cannabis possession. In the case of State v. Diana, a Spokane man with multiple sclerosis appealed his conviction of possession of a controlled substance on the grounds that the drug was necessary to treat his medical condition. The court held that the medical defense exists, but only in very specific circumstances.

Medical marijuana patients, however, had no legal way of obtaining the drug. In the 1990s, cannabis buyers clubs and cooperatives began providing the drug to patients in several cities across the US. These dispensaries operated in defiance of state and federal law, but were rarely targeted by law enforcement.

In 1995, the Green Cross Patient Co-op of Bainbridge Island became the first buyers club in the country to be raided by law enforcement. The cooperative, run by Joanna McKee and Ronald L. (Stich) Miller, provided cannabis at little or no cost to over 70 patients with diseases such as AIDS, cancer, and multiple sclerosis. Both McKee and Miller were arrested, and around 130 cannabis plants were seized. The case was later dismissed when a Kitsap County judge ruled that the search warrant used to execute the raid was invalid. McKee and Miller moved the co-op to Seattle and resumed operations.

In reaction to the raid against the Green Cross Patient Co-op, an attorney from Tacoma named Ralph Seeley sued the state of Washington, seeking to have cannabis rescheduled as a Schedule II drug. This would have allowed doctors to write prescriptions for medical marijuana. Seeley, who had been diagnosed with a rare bone cancer in 1986, used cannabis obtained from the co-op to treat the side effects of his chemotherapy. A Pierce County Superior Court judge ruled in Seeley's favor, but the decision was overturned by the Washington Supreme Court by an 8–1 margin.

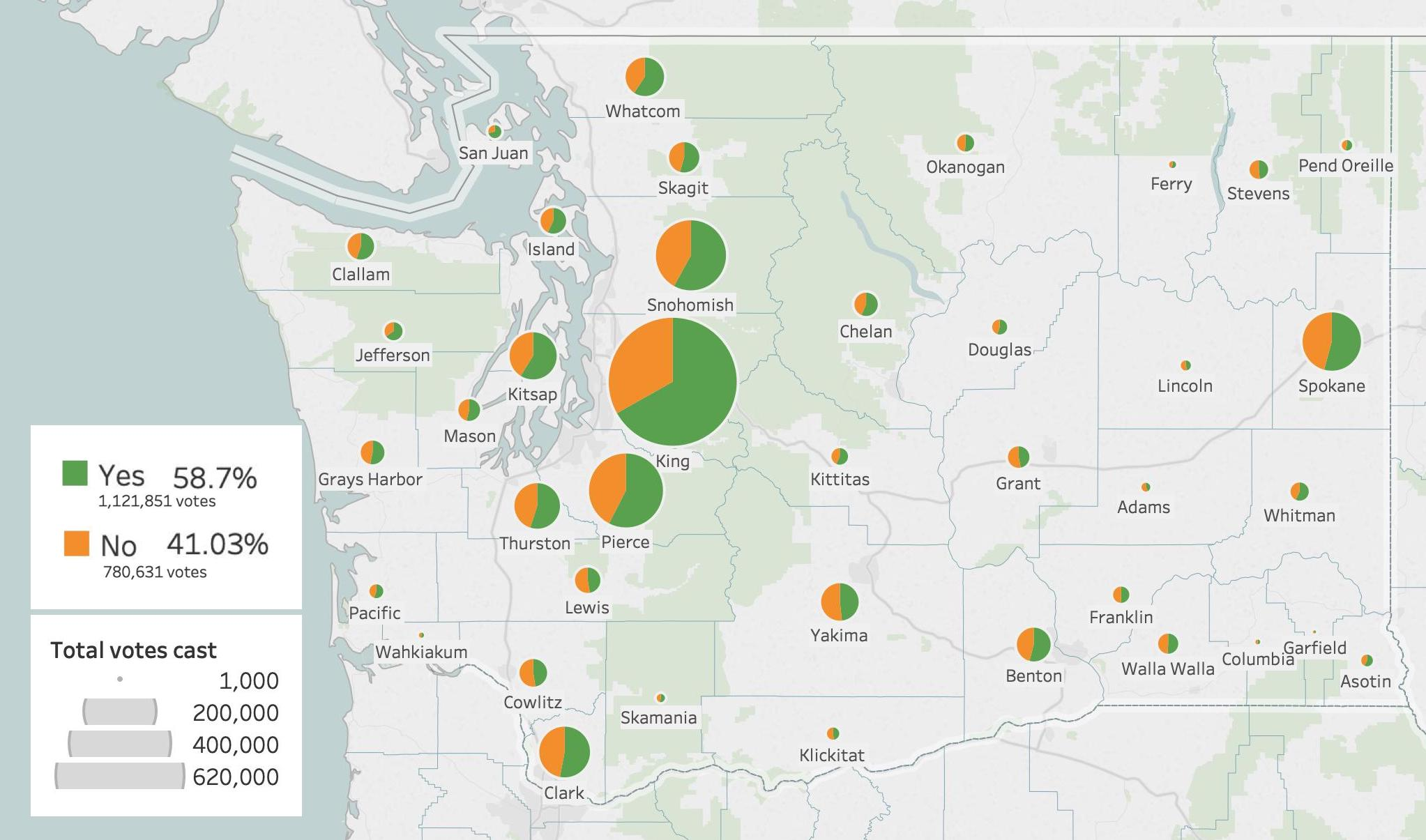
Initiative 692 results by county, with number of votes shown by size, yes in green and no in orange: Yes No

Following the ruling, two separate ballot initiatives were filed to decriminalize medical marijuana in the state. Both were sponsored by physician Rob Killian. Initiative 685, which appeared on the 1997 general ballot, would have allowed doctors to prescribe any Schedule I drug, if scientific research supported medical use. It would have also paroled drug prisoners. The initiative failed, with 60.4% of voters rejecting it. The following year, Initiative 692 was filed, which was limited only to decriminalizing medical marijuana. The initiative was endorsed by The Seattle Times, marking one of the first times a major newspaper in the U.S. backed a medical marijuana initiative. I-692 was approved by a margin of 59.0% to 41.0%.

The passage of I-692 allowed physicians to recommend medical marijuana to patients with terminal or debilitating illnesses including: "chemotherapy-related nausea and vomiting in cancer patients; AIDS wasting syndrome; severe muscle spasms associated with multiple sclerosis and other spasticity disorders; epilepsy; acute or chronic glaucoma; and some forms of intractable pain." The initiative also allowed the state to add new illnesses to the list as necessary. Qualifying patients with a note from their doctor were permitted to possess a sixty-day supply of cannabis, which was later defined to be "twenty-four ounces of usable marijuana and no more than fifteen plants."

Although the law did not explicitly allow dispensaries, many were established and often went ignored by law enforcement. By 2011, there were around 75 storefront dispensaries open in Seattle and 55 in Spokane. That same year, the state legislature passed an overhaul of medical marijuana laws, which would have created a system of state-licensed growers, processors and dispensaries. Governor Christine Gregoire, however, vetoed most of the new legislation, explaining that she would "not subject [...] state employees to federal prosecution."

In April 2011, United States Attorney for the Eastern District of Washington Michael C. Ormsby ordered all dispensaries operating in Spokane to cease operations. Most complied, but several owners who refused to close their stores were arrested. Later that year, federal raids on medical marijuana dispensaries also occurred in western Washington. 15 dispensaries were targeted in cities including Seattle, Tacoma, Olympia, Puyallup, Lacey and Rochester.

=== Legalization ===
In spite of federal prohibition, public support in the state for marijuana reform continued to grow. In 2003, Seattle passed an initiative making adult marijuana possession the lowest priority of law enforcement agencies in the city. Tacoma passed a similar initiative in 2011. A 2010 poll by the University of Washington found that 52% of Washington voters supported removing criminal and civil penalties for marijuana possession.

In early 2010, the Washington House of Representatives considered two bills regarding cannabis. One would have allowed cannabis sales in state liquor stores, and the other would have decriminalized possession of forty grams or less. Both bills died in committee. Cannabis activists responded by filing Initiative 1068, which would have removed all state-level criminal and civil penalties for cannabis use or possession by adults over the age of 18. Despite an endorsement by the Washington State Democratic Party, the campaign received little fundraising and failed to gather enough signatures to secure a spot on the ballot.

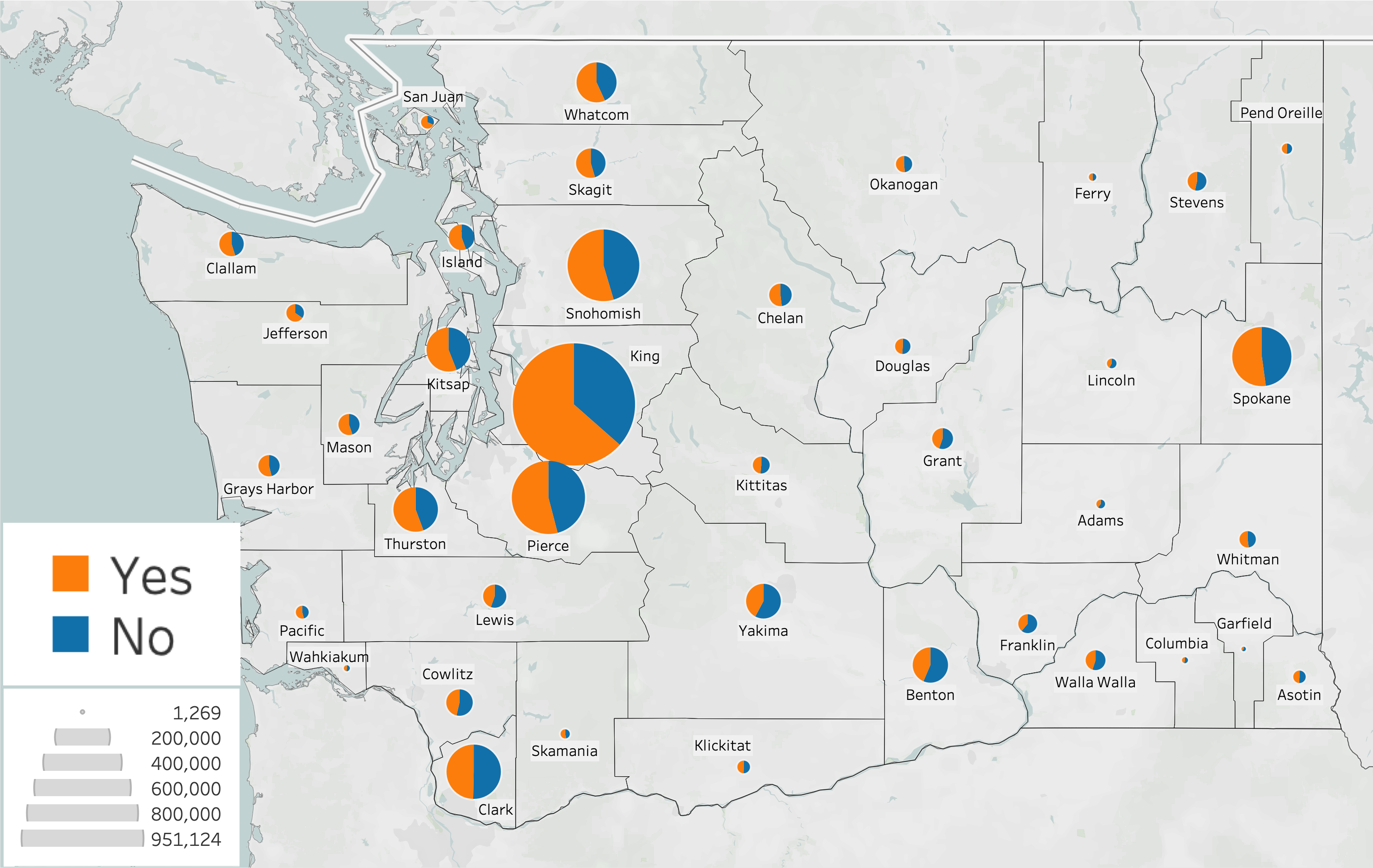
Initiative 502 results by county, with number of votes shown by size, yes in orange and no in blue: Yes No

The following year, a separate group of activists filed Initiative 502, which proposed to legalize the use of cannabis for adults over the age of 21. The bill would also allow the Washington State Liquor Control Board to regulate and tax cannabis production and sales, and set new limits on blood THC (tetrahydrocannabinol) levels for driving under the influence. In December 2011, the initiative received enough signatures to be sent to the state legislature. In April 2012, when the legislature adjourned without acting, the initiative advanced to the 2012 general ballot.

Early supporters of the measure included Seattle's The Stranger and Spokane's The Spokesman-Review. I-502 was also endorsed by the Washington State Democratic Party, the mayor and entire city council of Seattle, and the sheriff of King County. National support came from the National Organization for the Reform of Marijuana Laws (NORML), the NAACP, Law Enforcement Action Partnership (LEAP) and the American Civil Liberties Union (ACLU).

The initiative faced little organized opposition. The most vocal opponents were medical marijuana advocates, who claimed the new DUI provisions were too strict and that recreational dispensaries would hurt the medical marijuana industry. Police groups such as the Washington Association of Sheriffs and Police Chiefs also opposed the initiative, but did little fundraising or campaigning against it.

On November 6, 2012, I-502 was approved by a vote of 55.7% to 44.3% Possession of up to 1 ounce (28 g) of marijuana by adults became legal under state law on December 6, however cultivation, sale and even gifting remained illegal. Laws regarding medical marijuana remained unchanged. After I-502 went into effect, the Washington State Liquor Control board began establishing regulations for the new recreational cannabis industry, with a deadline of December 1, 2013 set by the initiative.

In August 2013, the United States Department of Justice announced that it would not interfere with state-level legalization, as long as distribution and sales were strictly regulated by the state. On November 18, 2013, the state began accepting applications for marijuana businesses including growers, processors and retail outlets. The Liquor Control Board initially planned to allow 334 retail stores and 2,000,000 square feet (190,000 m^{2}) of growing space statewide. The first recreational cannabis stores in Washington opened to the public on July 8, 2014.

The possession for cannabis extractions for recreational use is 7 grams in Washington. However, the allowed limit of any hashish for medical use is 21 grams. The concentrated form of cannabis has significantly higher amounts of THC content that can reach a purity of 99%.

=== Hemp legislation ===
In accordance with the Federal 2014 Farm Bill, the state legislature passed ESSB 6206 in 2016, creating the Industrial Hemp Research Pilot (IHRP). The state's first post-Prohibition hemp crop was planted at Moses Lake in 2017, and a total of 180 acres (73 ha) was planted that year.

=== Nomenclature ===
On March 11, 2022, the Revised Code of Washington was amended to replace "marijuana" with "cannabis" via House Bill 1210.

== Production and distribution ==
=== Black market ===
Even before the establishment of state-licensed growers and retail stores, cannabis was easily obtainable. Much of the state's supply was grown locally or imported from the neighboring Canadian province of British Columbia or from Mexico. According to the Drug Enforcement Administration, the state was among the top five producers of indoor-grown cannabis in 1996, the last year the agency published estimated crop sizes by state. About 80% of the cannabis seized in the Seattle area was grown indoors. In 1998, NORML published a report claiming cannabis was Washington's fifth most valuable cash crop.

After the increase in security at the United States–Mexico border, due in part to the September 11 attacks of 2001, Mexican cartels increasingly began to grow cannabis within the United States rather than export it from Mexico. The cartels utilized the favorable climate of Eastern Washington to establish large scale outdoor-growing operations in remote areas of national parks and tribal reservations. In 2010, around 82,000 cannabis plants were seized on tribal lands in the state, accounting for almost a quarter of all plants seized by law enforcement that year. These clandestine growers cause significant damage to the environment by diverting streams, clearing trees, using pesticides, poaching animals and leaving behind litter and human waste.

Although the state began regulating the cannabis industry in 2014, unlicensed production continued. In 2017, a drug bust organized by multiple counties seized over 33,000 cannabis plants which were suspected to be part of an illegal growing operation run by Chinese nationals.

=== State-licensed businesses ===
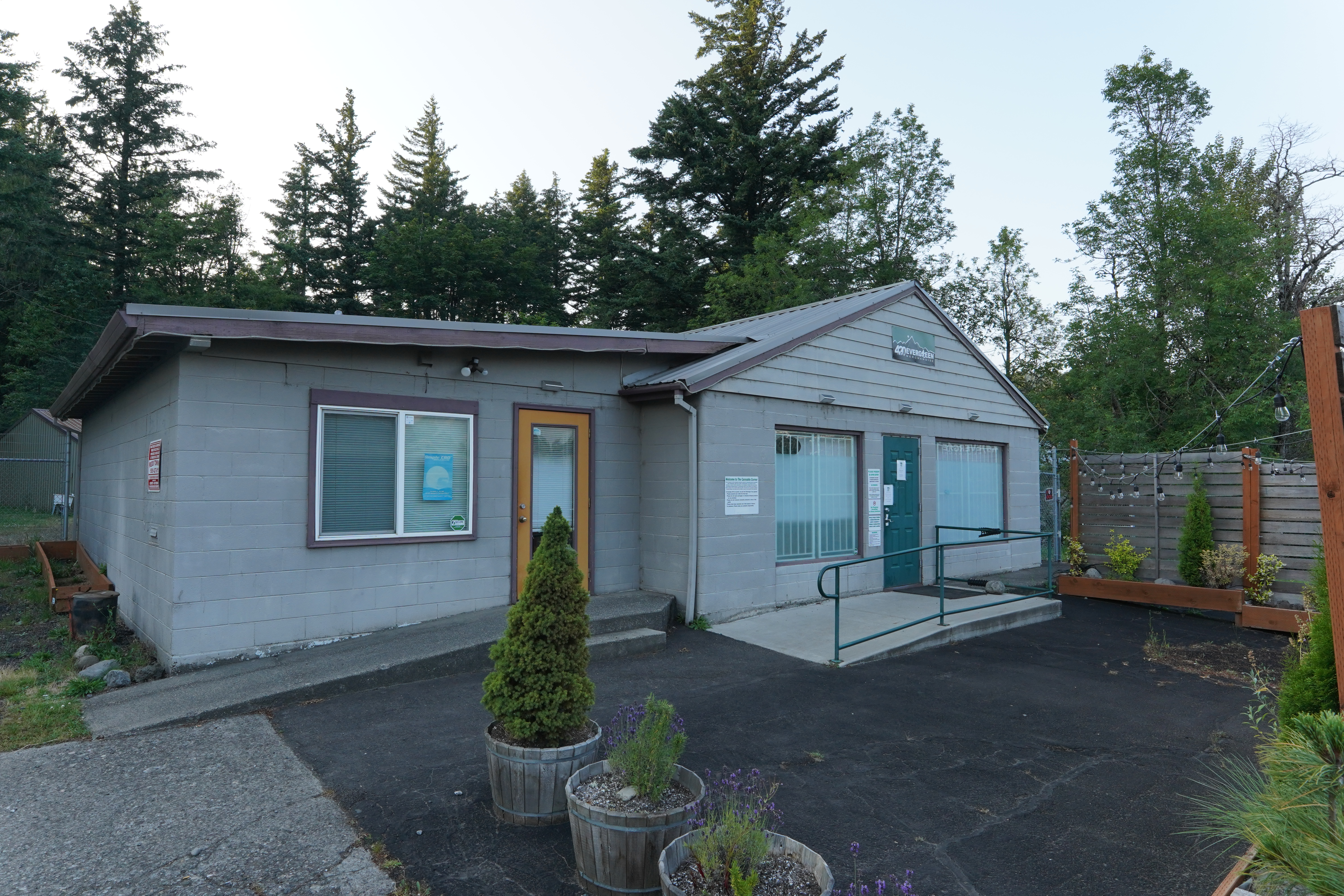
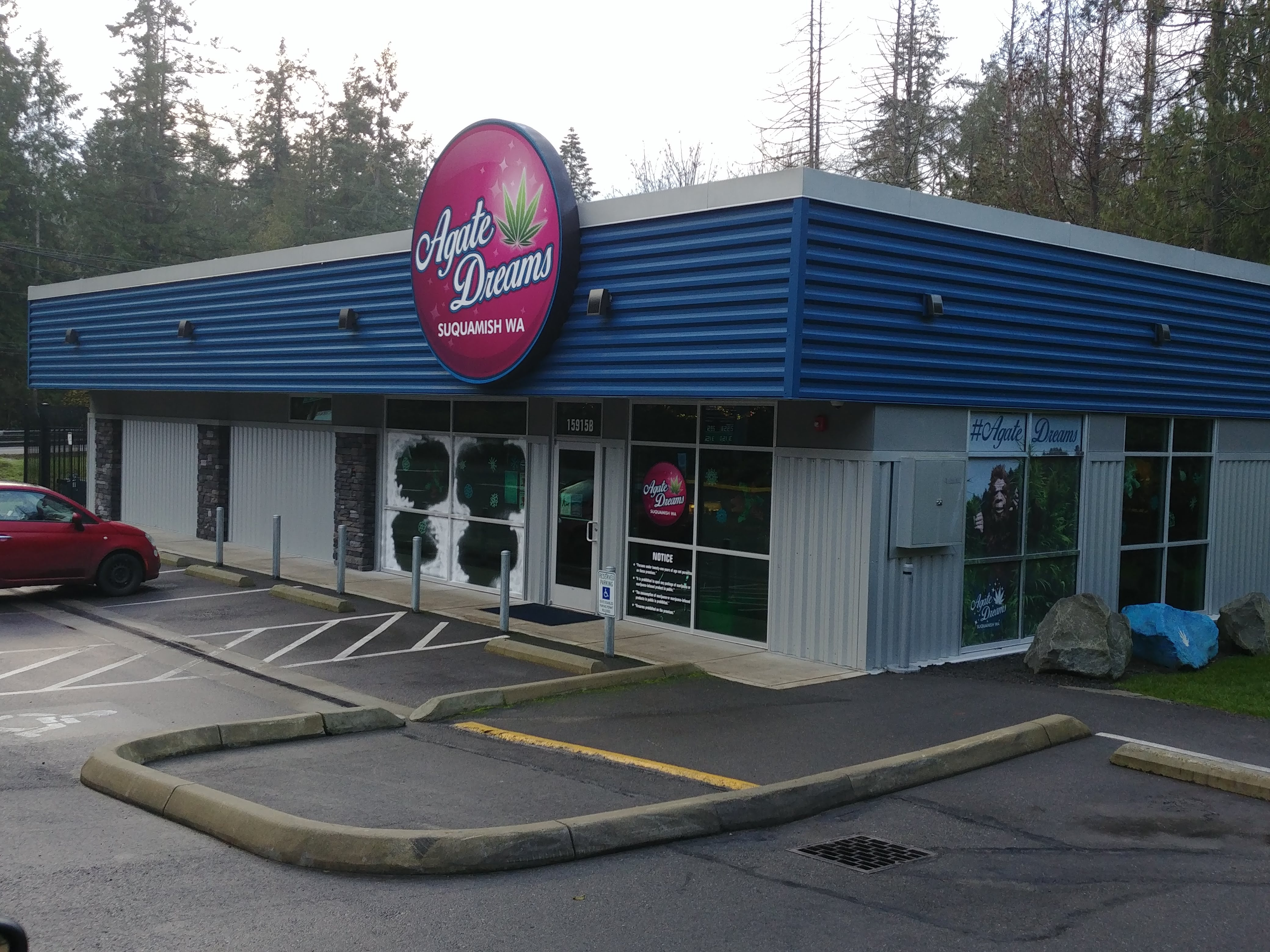
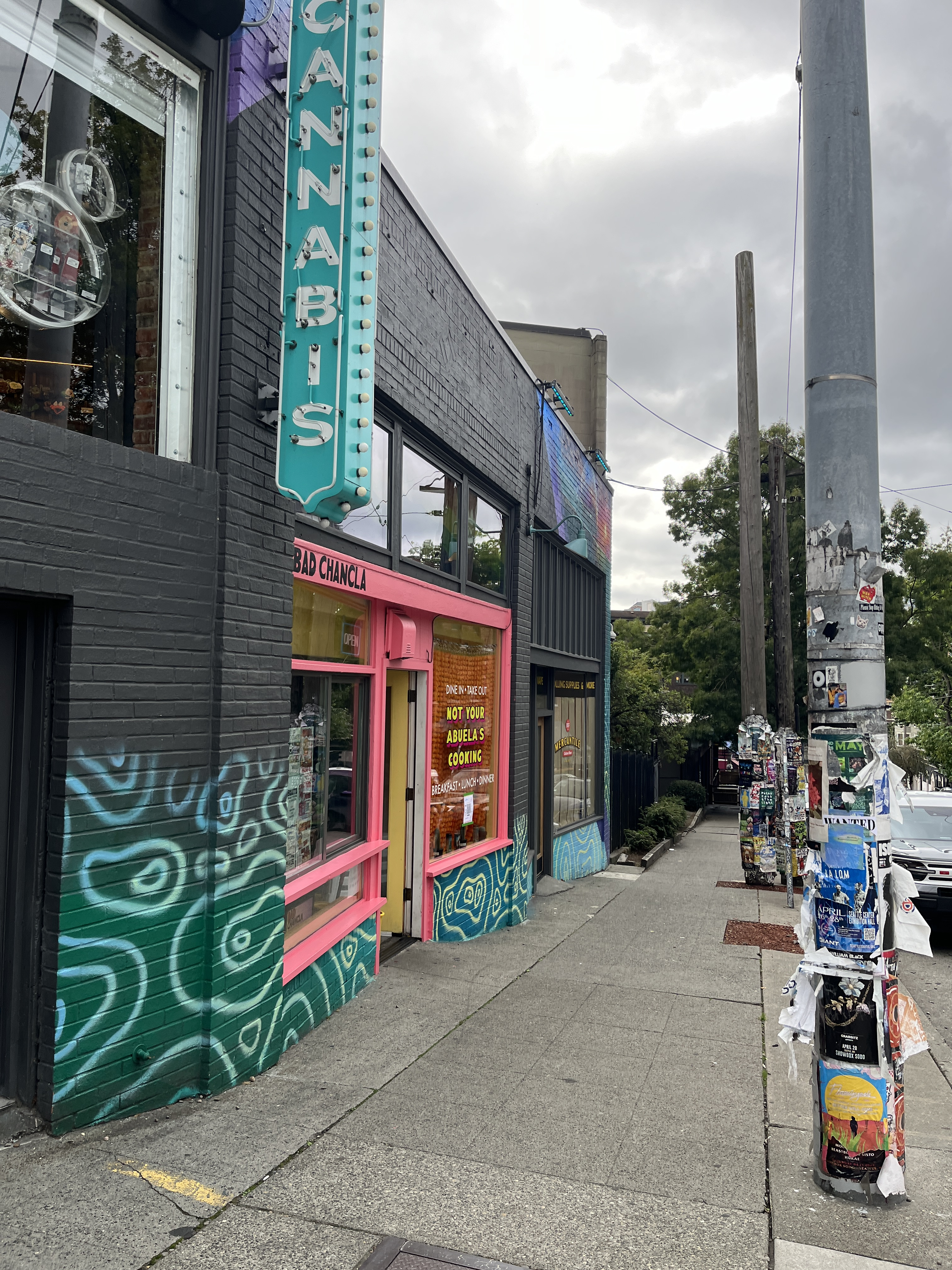
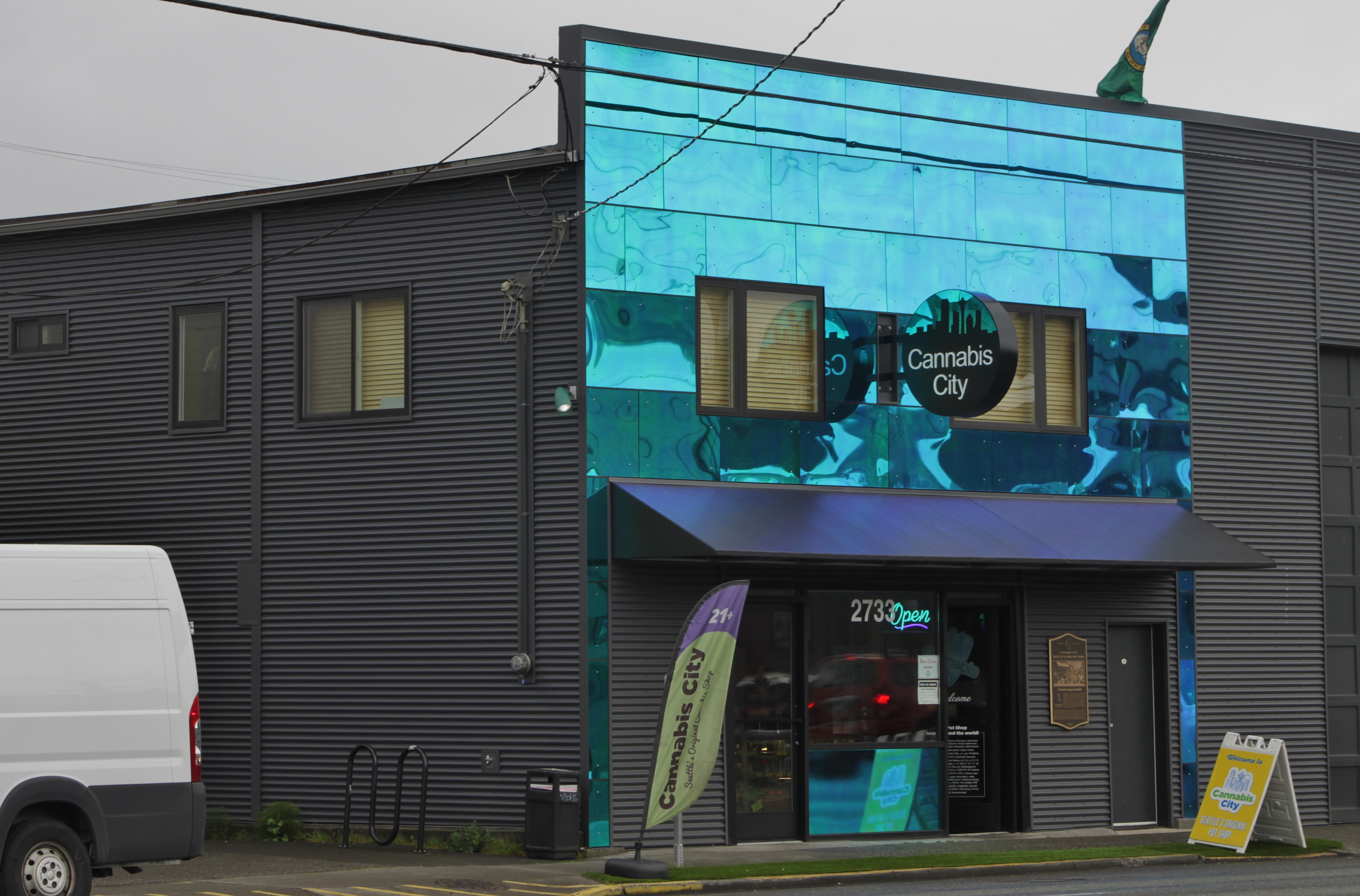
Various cannabis stores in Washington state (photos taken between 2017 and 2024)

Washington's legal cannabis industry is regulated by the state's Liquor and Cannabis Board (formerly known as the Washington State Liquor Control Board). The state offers separate business licenses to cannabis growers, processors and retailers. Grower and processor licenses can be held simultaneously, but retailers cannot obtain either grower or processor licenses. Growers may only legally sell cannabis to licensed processors or retailers—not directly to consumers. Unlike other states that have legalized recreational cannabis, Washington does not allow unlicensed cultivation for personal use.

In May 2014, the Liquor and Cannabis Board held a lottery to award licenses to qualified applicants. Retail sales began in July 2014. As retailers only had two months to establish storefronts and acquire inventory, stores experienced supply issues during the summer of 2014. This caused limited availability and inflated prices for consumers. During the first several months of legal sales, prices exceeded US$20 per gram. Due in part to a strong harvest of outdoor-grown cannabis in the fall of 2014, supply levels increased and the state's licensed marijuana industry had stabilized by early 2015. By August 2015, the average price had fallen to a low of $8 per gram.

=== Sales and taxation ===
During the first 11 months of licensed retail sales, total sales amounted to US$260 million. Sales increased to $486 million in 2015, and $1.1 billion in 2016; sales/excise tax revenue has risen in tandem, increasing from $65 million in 2015FY to $315 million in 2017FY.

Retail sales are taxed at 37%, which accounts for the majority of the state's marijuana tax revenue. The allocation of tax revenue was dictated by Initiative 502. The majority of the money goes towards public health programs such as Medicaid, community health centers and substance abuse prevention efforts. The remaining funds go towards the Liquor and Cannabis Board, local governments, and the state general fund.

== Culture ==
=== Usage ===
According to the Substance Abuse and Mental Health Services Administration, as of 2015–2016, 19.5% of Washington adults aged 18 or older have used cannabis within the past year, relative to the national average, which was estimated at 13.9% by the same survey.

A 2016 survey by the Washington State Department of Health found that adolescent usage in the state has remained stable over the past decade despite the introduction of retail stores in 2014. According to Monitoring the Future, between 2010–2012 and 2014–2016, marijuana usage by eighth and 10th graders increased by 2.0% and 4.1% respectively. Both surveys found that the perceived harm associated with use has declined among adolescents since legalization.

=== Events ===
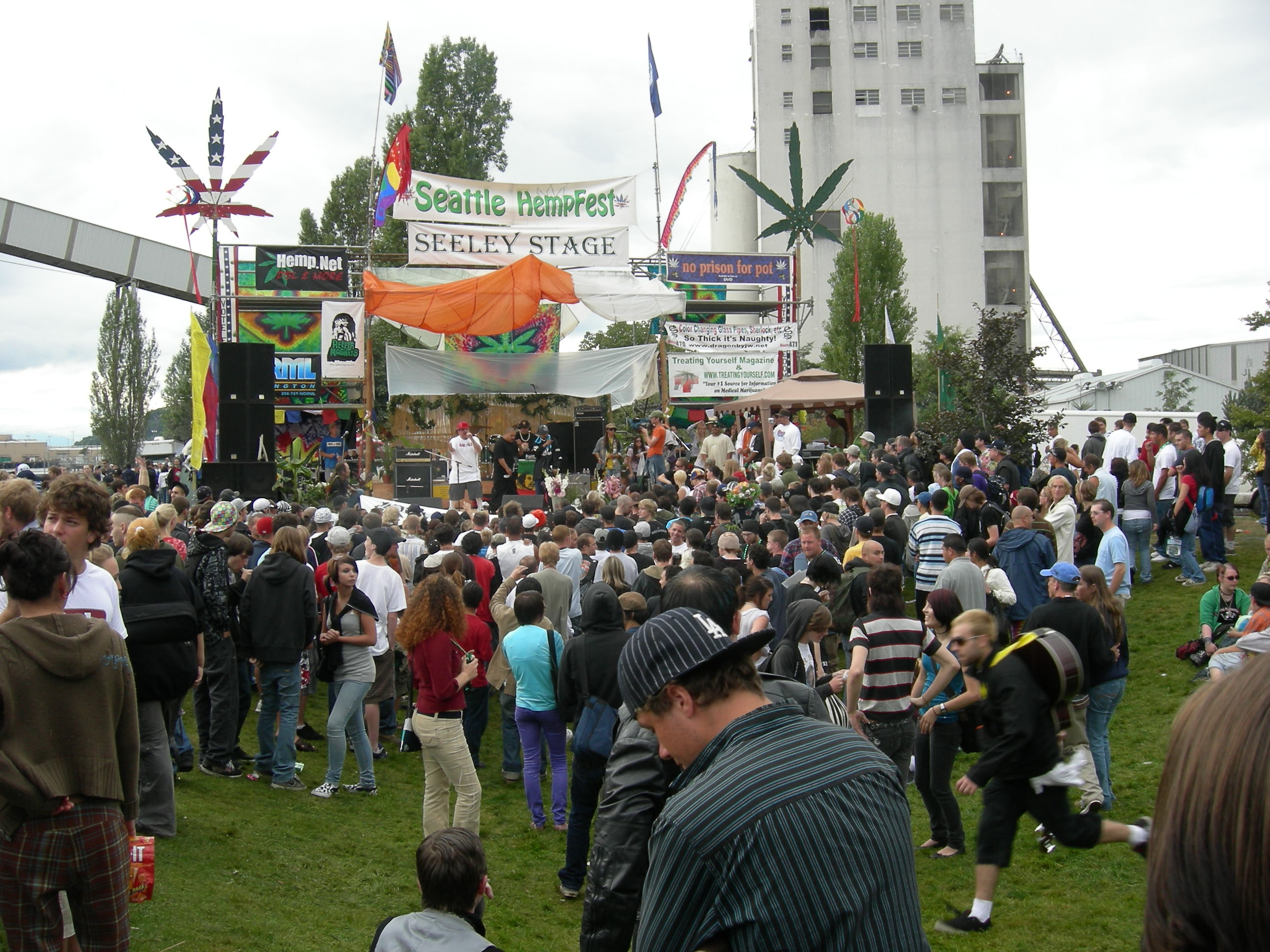
Seattle Hempfest, 2007

Since 1991, Washington has hosted the annual Seattle Hempfest, a protest festival which advocates the reform of cannabis laws. The event is held in Seattle city parks and features speakers (including politicians and activists) as well as live music. Attendance has grown from around 500 people in its first year to 200,000 at the 2003 festival. Following the passage of I-502, the event still draws over 100,000 attendees annually. Olympia has also hosted a similar event beginning in 2004, the Olympia Hempfest.

The Cannabis Farmers Market in Seattle was founded in 2010, the first-ever legal medical cannabis farmers' market in the world, and the largest and most attended market of its kind. The market was featured on the cover of High Times Medical Marijuana magazine, and G4 TV's Attack of the Show!

The market originally opened in Tacoma but moved to Seattle in 2013.

The monthly enclosed market features medical cannabis and is free and open to all legal medical marijuana patients. The Cannabis Farmers Market has inspired others in Olympia and Seattle, Washington, and several other states. A similar event scheduled in Vancouver, Washington was cancelled in November 2012 at the request of local police.

== Washington State Supreme Court legalized simple drug possession ==
In February 2021, the Washington State Supreme Court made a ruling that legalized simple drug possession, or mere possession without intent.

== State interstate commerce laws of 2023 ==
In May 2023, the Governor of Washington State signed into law a bill that passed the state legislature - to explicitly allow the state to fully implement "interstate commerce" of cannabis and/or other related purposes on marijuana. The new legislation goes into legal effect after 90 days. Both California and Oregon have adopted and implemented similar interstate commerce laws on cannabis or marijuana.

== Job protection laws ==
In May 2023, the Governor signed a bill into law after passing the Legislature - effective immediately, that "legally protects" home or in private usage/consumption cannabis users (outside of workplace hours for example) from getting fired, denied promotions and/or being discriminated against within Washington State. Alongside embedded protections with "race, disability, hairstyles, religion, sex, gender identity and sexual orientation, etc".

Since January 1, 2024 pre-screen employment regarding cannabis testing is banned. This does not apply to federal job positions within the state. This also does not apply to pre-screen employment before January 1, 2024.
