= I-502 =

I-502 may refer to:

- Japanese submarine I-502
- Washington Initiative 502
