= Alison Holcomb =

American activist

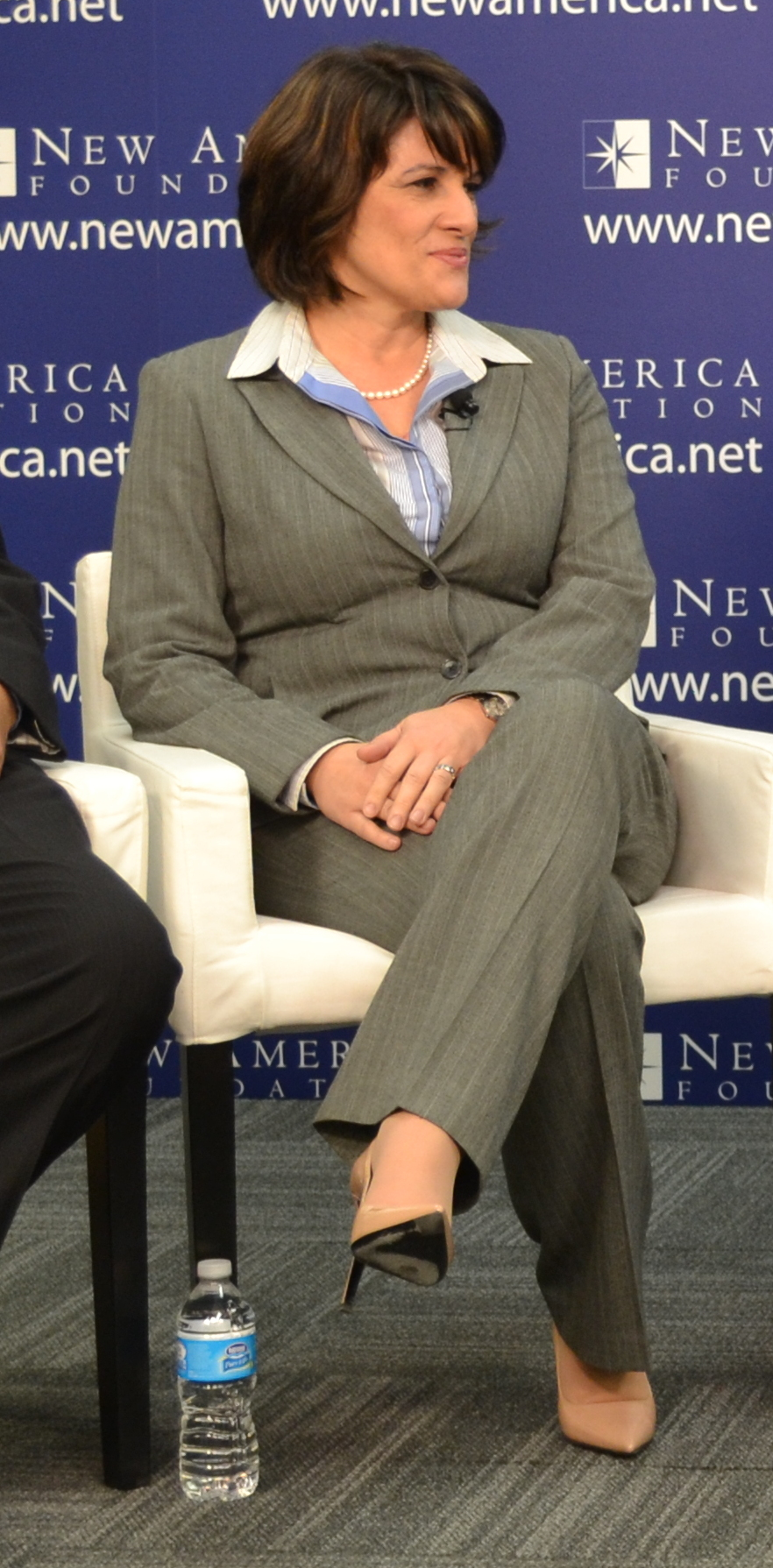
- Holcomb in 2013

Criminal justice director of American Civil Liberties Union (ACLU) Washington

Alison Holcomb has served as criminal justice director of American Civil Liberties Union (ACLU) Washington and in 2014 was named national director of the ACLU Campaign to End Mass Incarceration. Holcomb wrote Initiative 502, which legalized recreational cannabis in Washington, has been called "Pot Mama". In her role as director of the Campaign to End Mass Incarceration, she will work "to reform state-level criminal justice policies that have increased incarceration rates dramatically during a period of declining crime and have exacerbated racial disparities".
