= Evergreen: The Road to Legalization =

- Film poster
- Directed by: Riley Morton
- Written by: Nils Cowan
- Release date: June 6, 2013 (Seattle)
- Country: United States
- Language: English

Evergreen: The Road to Legalization is a 2013 documentary film directed by Riley Morton about the U.S. state of Washington's passage of an initiative decriminalizing recreational cannabis. The film was written by Nils Cowan and features defense lawyer Doug Hiatt, American Civil Liberties Union lawyer Alison Holcomb, Pete Holmes, John McKay, initiative opponent Steve Sarich, and Rick Steves.
