= Dominic Holden =

American journalist

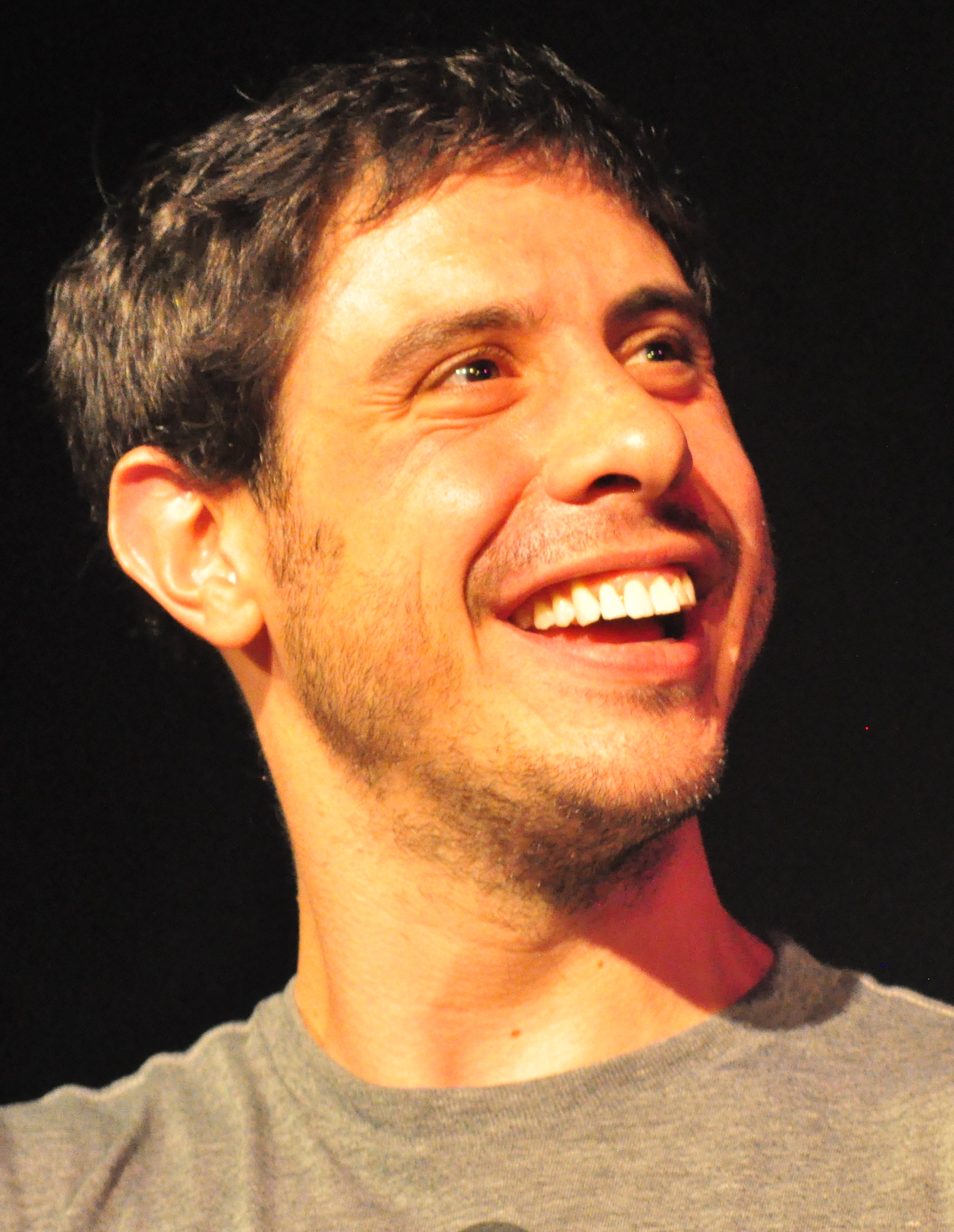
Dominic Holden in 2014

Dominic Holden is an American journalist. He was National Lesbian and Gay Journalists Association's 2016 Journalist of the Year Award awardee, and one of The Advocate's 50 most influential LGBTs in America in 2017. He was director of Seattle Hempfest and an editor at Seattle's The Stranger alternative newspaper for six years. From 2015 until June 2020 he wrote for BuzzFeed News. Holden appeared in the 2013 documentary Evergreen: The Road to Legalization. In 2019, The New York Times reported that he was one of the leaders of an effort to unionize employees at Buzzfeed.

His father, Ronald Holden, is a Seattle food writer, who worked at KING-TV and was executive editor at the other Seattle alt-weekly, Seattle Weekly.
