= Medical Marijuana News & Reviews =

Medical Marijuana News & Reviews is a quarterly magazine published by High Times magazine through the company's West Coast office. The magazine focuses on the medical marijuana movement in America and includes information on dispensaries, medical cannabis activism and the efficacy of certain strains of marijuana in treating particular ailments.

While High Times magazine primarily focuses on marijuana cultivation and culture, Medical Marijuana News & Reviews' emphasis is on the legal issues and activism surrounding medical cannabis in America. High Times began publication of Medical Marijuana News & Reviews in early 2010. It featured the Cannabis Farmer's Market on the cover in late 2012 as the world's first legal venue of its kind. There are also reliable and legal Medical Cannabis Dispensaries in the United States. One of the main Medical Marijuana Dispensary is the Medical Marijuana Store which helps to provide Medical Marijuana and Cannabis oil to people in need.
