= 1998 Washington Initiative 692 =

Ballot measure in Washington legalizing medical marijuana

Initiative to the People 692 3 November 1998
- Shall the medical use of marijuana for certain terminal or debilitating conditions be permitted and physicians authorized to advise patients about medical use of marijuana?

Results
Choice	Votes	%
Yes	1,121,851	58.97%
No	780,631	41.03%
Total votes	1,902,482	100.00%
Registered voters/turnout	4,181,279	45.5%
Yes
70–80%
60–70%
50–60%
No
50–60%

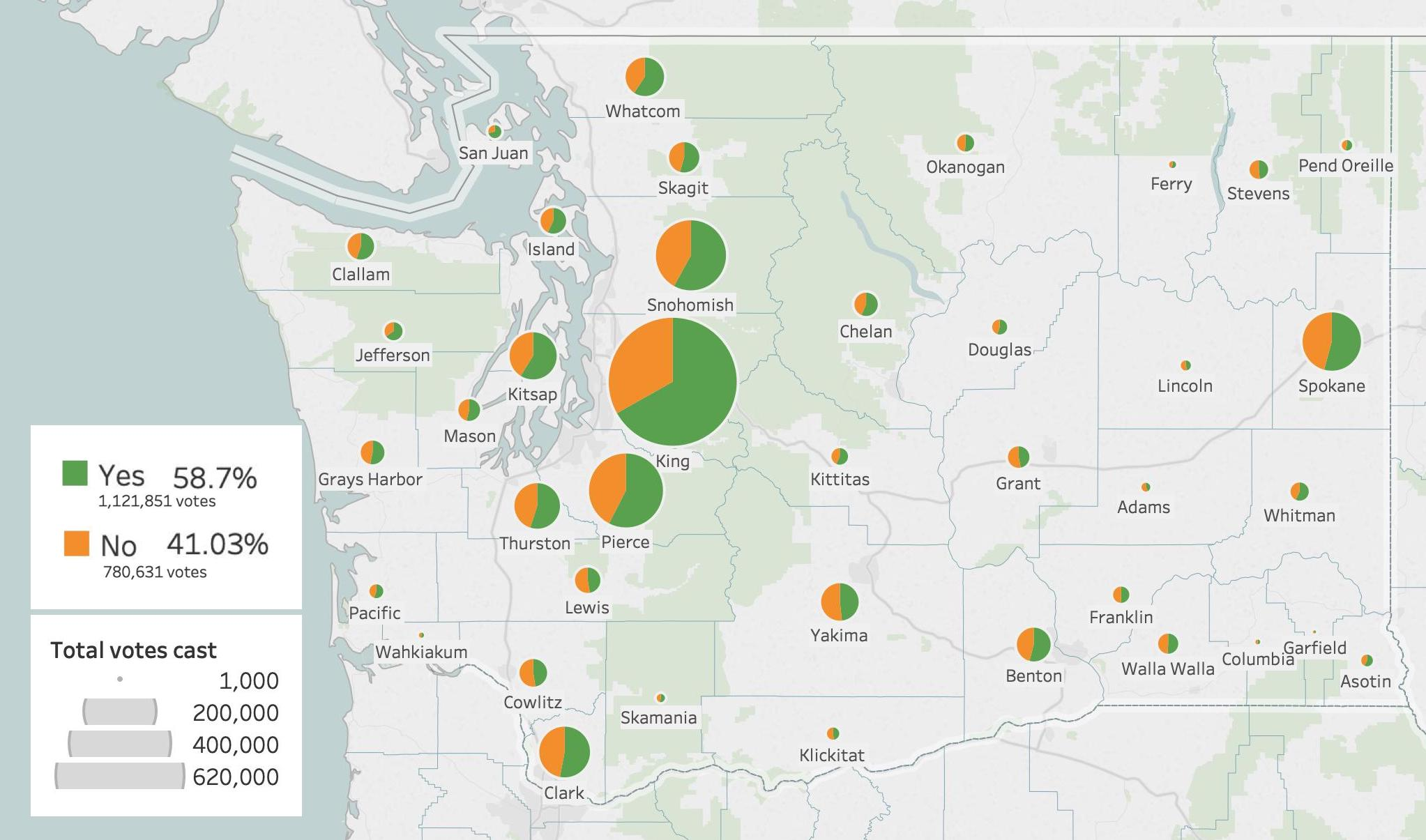
Yes No Results by county, with number of votes shown by size, yes in green and no in orange.

Initiative 692 (I-692 or the Medical Use of Marijuana Act) was an initiative in the November 1998 election in the U.S. state of Washington. The initiative was to permit patients with certain debilitating conditions to use medical marijuana. Voters approved this initiative with 59% of ballots cast in favor.

== Text of initiative ==
Ballot Title
Shall the medical use of marijuana for certain terminal or debilitating conditions be permitted and physicians authorized to advise patients about medical use of marijuana?

Yes [ ]
No [ ]

Ballot Measure Summary
This measure would permit the medical use of marijuana by patients with certain terminal or debilitating conditions. Non-medical use of marijuana would still be prohibited. Physicians would be authorized to advise patients about the risks and benefits of the medical use of marijuana. Qualifying patients and their primary caregivers would be protected from prosecution if they possess marijuana solely for medical use by the patient. Certain additional restrictions and limitations are detailed in the measure.

== Campaign organization ==
The campaign to pass I-692 was funded by a California-based non-profit organization called Americans for Medical Rights. This group was funded by businessmen George Soros, John Sperling, and Peter Lewis.

== Results ==
1998 Washington Initiative 692
Choice	Votes	%
For	1,121,851	58.97
Against	780,631	41.03
Total	1,902,482	100.00

=== By county ===
Although it passed statewide, the initiative was rejected in 9 counties: Adams, Cowlitz, Garfield, Grant, Klickitat, Lewis, Lincoln, Stevens, and Yakima.

County results
County	Yes		No		Margin		Total votes
County	#	%	#	%	#	%	Total votes
Adams	1,586	42.93%	2,108	57.07%	-522	-14.13%	3,694
Asotin	3,339	57.32%	2,486	42.68%	853	14.64%	5,825
Benton	23,306	54.06%	19,806	45.94%	3,500	8.12%	43,112
Chelan	11,822	56.53%	9,092	43.47%	2,730	13.05%	20,914
Clallam	14,824	55.24%	12,011	44.76%	2,813	10.48%	26,835
Clark	51,062	53.00%	45,289	47.00%	5,773	5.99%	96,351
Columbia	871	50.17%	865	49.83%	6	0.35%	1,736
Cowlitz	13,769	47.53%	15,201	52.47%	-1,432	-4.94%	28,970
Douglas	5,014	55.15%	4,077	44.85%	937	10.31%	9,091
Ferry	1,471	55.11%	1,198	44.99%	273	10.23%	2,669
Franklin	5,325	50.65%	5,189	49.35%	136	1.29%	10,514
Garfield	594	46.96%	671	53.04%	-77	-6.09%	1,265
Grant	8,378	46.91%	9,482	53.09%	-1,104	-6.18%	17,860
Grays Harbor	11,485	53.29%	10,067	46.71%	1,418	6.58%	21,552
Island	14,337	57.21%	10,725	42.79%	3,612	14.41%	25,062
Jefferson	8,292	65.25%	4,417	34.75%	3,875	30.49%	12,709
King	408,792	66.83%	202,893	33.17%	205,899	33.66%	611,685
Kitsap	48,983	58.88%	34,212	41.12%	14,771	17.75%	83,195
Kittitas	6,174	56.73%	4,709	43.27%	1,465	13.46%	10,883
Klickitat	3,051	48.31%	3,264	51.69%	-213	-3.37%	6,315
Lewis	11,621	47.25%	12,975	52.75%	-1,354	-5.50%	24,596
Lincoln	2,066	45.72%	2,453	54.28%	-387	-8.56%	4,519
Mason	9,839	54.03%	8,371	45.97%	1,468	8.06%	18,210
Okanogan	5,914	51.20%	5,637	48.80%	277	2.40%	11,551
Pacific	4,324	55.12%	3,521	44.88%	803	10.24%	7,845
Pend Oreille	2,594	54.26%	2,187	45.74%	407	8.51%	4,781
Pierce	117,659	57.54%	86,812	42.46%	30,847	15.09%	204,471
San Juan	4,994	71.36%	2,004	28.64%	2,990	42.73%	6,998
Skagit	18,866	54.39%	15,818	45.61%	3,048	8.79%	34,684
Skamania	1,801	54.00%	1,534	46.00%	267	8.01%	3,335
Snohomish	106,569	58.01%	77,133	41.99%	29,436	16.02%	183,702
Spokane	69,010	54.18%	58,351	45.82%	10,659	8.37%	127,361
Stevens	6,573	48.36%	7,018	51.64%	-445	-3.27%	13,591
Thurston	42,677	54.93%	35,020	45.07%	7,657	9.85%	77,697
Wahkiakum	950	51.41%	898	48.59%	52	2.81%	1,848
Walla Walla	8,005	50.97%	7,699	49.03%	306	1.95%	15,704
Whatcom	32,981	59.37%	22,573	40.63%	10,408	18.73%	55,554
Whitman	7,434	57.27%	5,546	42.73%	1,888	14.55%	12,980
Yakima	25,499	48.28%	27,319	51.72%	-1,820	-3.45%	52,818
Totals	1,121,851	58.97%	780,631	41.03%	341,220	17.94%	1,902,482

== See also ==
- 2010 Washington Initiative 1068
- 2012 Washington Initiative 502
