= Washington State Liquor and Cannabis Board =

Regulatory board

Agency overview
- Formed: January 23, 1934 (As the Washington State Liquor Control Board)
- Type: Liquor control board
- Jurisdiction: Washington
- Headquarters: 1025 Union Avenue S.E. Olympia, Washington, United States
- Employees: 300+
- Agency executives: William Lukela, Executive Director; Jim Vollendroff, Board Chair
- Key document: Steele Act, 1934
- Website: Washington State Liquor and Cannabis Board

The Washington State Liquor and Cannabis Board, formerly the Washington State Liquor Control Board, is an administrative agency of the State of Washington. The Liquor and Cannabis Board is part of the executive branch and reports to the governor. The board's primary function is the licensing of on and off premises establishments which sell any type of alcohol, and the enforcement and education of the state's alcohol, tobacco, and cannabis laws.

== History ==
Historical logo for Washington State Liquor Control Board

Alcohol prohibition was repealed by Washington Initiative 61 in 1932, and from 1933 to 2012, the WSLCB was the sole distributor of all liquors and spirits in the state. In addition, they were also the primary retailer: the state operated 167 stores, while 163 stores were operated by private businesses who contracted with the state for a commission on the sales. These contract stores were generally located in either smaller cities or more remote and rural areas, while the state stores were typically located in larger, more populated areas. Because the state was the sole distributor of all spirits, uniform pricing was set so that the price of any given product was the same from store to store no matter how rural or populated the area was.

Historically, off-premises Sunday sales of spirits were banned, and all liquor stores were closed. Consumers still had the option of purchasing beer or wine from grocery stores or on-premises spirits from bars and restaurants. In 2005, the state began allowing off-premises spirits sales in select stores on Sundays from 12 p.m. to 5 p.m.

These rigid restrictions were a perennial source of frustration for Washington-based warehouse club giant Costco, which blossomed during the 1980s and 1990s into one of the largest retailers in the United States—and eventually, the world. During its nationwide expansion, Costco became experienced in selling wine, beer, and spirits through its warehouses in other states with much more relaxed rules (e.g., California). After an unsuccessful court battle, Costco mounted a direct challenge to its home state's alcoholic beverage control system by spending over $22 million to bring Initiative 1183 to state voters—at the time, "the most expensive initiative fight" in state history.

In the November 8, 2011 election, 60 percent of the electorate voted in favor of Initiative 1183, which brought several changes to the liquor distribution and retailing system. The most significant of these changes was the end to the state monopoly on liquor sales and distribution. The state's exit from retail liquor sales meant that over 900 state employees lost their jobs.

On June 1, 2012, Washington completed its transition to private liquor sales. Under I-1183, spirits may only be sold in premises of at least 10,000 square feet (929 square meters), generally including grocery stores, warehouse clubs, department stores, and some larger specialty shops. Exceptions to the 10,000 sq. ft. rule are granted for any former state or contract store that has chosen to remain open under private ownership, and for establishments that are in a "trade area" where no building exists that meets the 10,000 sq. ft. requirement. The WSLCB has not yet defined "trade area".

Under the state-run system, the shelf price included all taxes. Under the private system, as implemented by I-1183, all spirits are to be taxed at 20.5% on the shelf price in addition to a flat spirits liter tax of $3.7708 per liter. Many retailers no longer include these taxes in the shelf price, which has led to some sticker shock and confusion at the register. For instance, a 1.75 liter bottle of whiskey with a shelf price of $15.99 will have $3.28 in sales tax and $6.60 in liter taxes added at the register, bringing the total cost to $25.87.

In November 2012, citizen's initiative 502 was passed legalizing the recreational use of cannabis and assigning regulation of the cannabis industry to the then Liquor Control Board. The board's name was officially changed to reflect the addition of cannabis effective July 24, 2015.

== Enforcement and Education Division ==
Enforcement Officers are assigned to the Education and Enforcement Division enforcing state alcohol, tobacco, vapor, cannabis products, and drug laws. These officers are fully sworn state trained police officers who are considered limited-authority law enforcement with authority only over the state's alcohol, tobacco, vapor, cannabis products, and drug laws. The Enforcement Division conducts compliance checks where underage and undercover Investigative Aides attempt to purchase alcohol or tobacco products from state licensed businesses. Individuals who sell to minors are cited and the associated business receives a notice of an administrative violation accompanied by associated fines. Officers serve search warrants and support local, state and federal agencies conducting alcohol, cannabis, tobacco, and vapor related investigations across the state. Officers also conduct premises checks and operations to detect public safety violations such as overserving patrons.

The current Chief of the Enforcement and Education Division Lawerence Grant PhD as of March 3, 2025 according to the Agency. The Division has regional offices in Federal Way, Olympia,] and Mount Vernon as well as field offices in Seattle, Yakima, and Pasco.

=== Alcohol Impact Areas (AIAs) ===
In 2005, the Seattle City Council asked the Liquor Control Board to prohibit the sale of certain low-priced, highly-alcoholic beverages in an impoverished "Alcohol Impact Area". The City requested the order after an earlier, "Good Neighbor" policy, in which the city requested convenience stores and liquor outlets in areas with large homeless populations voluntarily pull products known for their popularity with alcoholics, failed to adequately control the sale of such products to homeless individuals. Among the products sought to be banned were over two dozen beers, and six wines: Cisco, Gino's Premium Blend, MD 20/20, Night Train, Thunderbird, and Wild Irish Rose. The Liquor Control Board approved these restrictions on August 30, 2006.

The cities of Tacoma, Spokane, and Olympia also followed suit in instituting "Alcohol Impact Areas" of their own following Seattle's example. Vancouver has an AIA that is technically voluntary, though it currently has a 100% retailer compliance rate.

== Licensing and Regulation Division ==
The Licensing and Regulation Division issues liquor licenses, which numbered 14,604 in fiscal year 2006. Liquor licenses are issued to businesses and not-for-profit organizations. Various licenses exist and each license is suited to a particular type of business and product mix. Breweries, wineries, and distilleries would be licensed to produce their specific class of alcoholic beverages. Wholesalers and distributors would be licensed to buy beer and/or wine from breweries and wineries and sell to retailers. Retail licenses fit two categories depending on where the alcohol will be consumed. Retailers like grocery stores are licensed to sell beer, wine, and spirits to customers who take the products home or elsewhere. Retailers like bars and restaurants are licensed to serve alcoholic beverages for on-site consumption. This group of retailers can be licensed to serve either beer and wine or beer, wine, and spirits. Some activities require a special endorsement or permit such as caterer offering alcohol at a client's event.

=== Alcohol Server Permits ===
The Division manages the Mandatory Alcohol Server Training (MAST) program. Under state law, people who serve alcoholic beverages at a bar, restaurant, or similar establishment need to possess an Alcohol Server Permit. The division certifies private entities to provide Mandatory Alcohol Server Training (MAST) courses. These private entities, called trainers, offer MAST courses to individuals like bartenders, servers, waiters, and restaurant managers. When an individual completes an approved MAST course, the certified trainer sends that information to the Board, which issues an Alcohol Server Permit (either a Class 12 or Class 13 permit) to the individual.

A class 13 permit allows a person to carry beer, wine, or spirits to a customer's table and pour wine from a bottle into a customer's glass. A class 12 permit allows a person to pour spirits, make mixed drinks (cocktails), and draw beer from a tap in addition to what a class 13 permit allows. A person must be at least 18 years old to hold a class 13 permit and at least 21 years old to hold a class 12 permit. Any licensed establishment must have at least one person with a class 12 permit on-duty to serve alcoholic beverages to its customers. A person with a class 13 permit must be supervised by a person with a class 12 permit. Some violations of the Alcohol Server Permit rules are misdemeanor or gross misdemeanor crimes.
