= 2010 Washington Initiative 1068 =

Proposed ballot measure in Washington

Initiative 1068 (I-1068 or the Marijuana Reform Act) was a proposed initiative for the November 2010 Washington state general election that would have removed criminal penalties from the adult use, possession, and cultivation of marijuana in Washington. Sponsored by Vivian McPeak, Douglass Hiatt, Jeffrey Steinborn, Philip Dawdy, initiative I-1068 sought to legalize marijuana by removing marijuana offenses from the state's controlled substances act, but failed to gather enough signatures to qualify for the ballot.

The main proponent of I-1068 was the group Sensible Washington. The measure's co-authors included Seattle attorneys Doug Hiatt and Jeffrey Steinborn, Seattle Hempfest founder Vivian McPeak, medical marijuana patient and Cannabis Defense Coalition spokesman Ric Smith, and former Seattle Weekly contributor Philip Dawdy.

== Status of initiative ==
Sensible Washington needed to present 241,153 Washington voter signatures to the Secretary of State by July 2, 2010 to get the measure on the ballot in November. As of May 20, the group had collected approximately 100,000 signatures. On July 1, Sensible Washington announced that enough signatures had not been collected for ballot inclusion.

== History ==
In the United States, federal laws related to relaxing penalties related to marijuana have been discussed but not passed. Notable among these is the proposed Medical Marijuana Patient Protection Act of 2008, versions of which have been discussed since 2001. In 1998, Washington voters passed Initiative 692, removing criminal penalties for medical patients with an approved condition. Ten years later, a "60-day" supply for patients was defined as 24 ounces and 15 plants.

In early 2010, two bills relating to marijuana were defeated in committee by the Legislature (one proposed selling marijuana through liquor stores, the other sought decriminalize marijuana). Frustrated with the Legislature, Seattle activists filed I-1068 in January. On February 10, the Attorney General's office issued a ballot title and summary for the initiative. One week later, the campaign announced they had "cleared the statutory hurdles" and would start collecting signatures for the initiative.

== Text of initiative ==
The full text of the initiative is available online. I-1068 text

Ballot Title
Statement of Subject: Initiative Measure No. 1068 concerns marijuana.

Concise Description: This measure would remove state civil and criminal penalties for persons eighteen years or older who cultivate, possess, transport, sell, or use marijuana. Restrictions and penalties for persons under eighteen would be retained.

Should this measure be enacted into law?

Yes [ ]
No [ ]
Ballot Measure Summary
This measure would remove state civil and criminal penalties for persons eighteen years or older who cultivate, possess, transport, sell, or use marijuana. Marijuana would no longer be defined as a "controlled substance." Civil and criminal penalties relating to drug paraphernalia and provisions authorizing seizure or forfeiture of property would not apply to marijuana related offenses committed by persons eighteen years or older. The measure would retain current restrictions and penalties applicable to persons under eighteen.

== Petition distribution and circulation ==
Qualifying I-1068 for the November ballot is a grassroots, all-volunteer effort. In addition to traditional methods of distribution and circulation Sensible Washington has used some nontraditional methods to make petitions available to supporters.

The web site has PDF copies of the petition for download and instructions for printing valid petitions from the PDFs.

80,000 copies of the initiative were distributed in the June 23, 2010 issue of The Stranger. These were accompanied by a full-page advertisement explaining how to sign and collect valid signatures, return the petition and emphasizing the deadline for returning the petitions.

== Obstacles to qualifying I-1068 for the ballot ==
- Alleged fraud

Fraudulently misrepresenting other initiatives as I-1068, the Marijuana Reform Act Initiative, has been documented. Philip Dawdy, a campaign manager for I-1068, has stated his intention to file a complaint with the Washington State Attorney General's Office. Concerns have been expressed by I-1068 supporters that the initiative has not been signed by people who mistakenly believe they have already signed the Marijuana Reform initiative.

- Lack of use of signature gathering firm

Despite high polling numbers it is extremely rare that an initiative make it to the ballot without the use of a paid signature gathering firm. "They're pretty close to essential," says Philip Dawdy of the legalize-marijuana Initiative 1068. With less than $8,000 in contributions the campaign was unable to afford the prices charged.

== Stance on initiative ==
=== Polling results ===
The Washington Poll, a nonpartisan academic research poll organized by the University of Washington, surveyed a random sample of 1252 registered Washington voters between May 3 and 23. Of those, 52% supported and 35% opposed "the removing of state civil and criminal penalties for possession or use of marijuana."

=== Support ===
I-1068 has been endorsed by the following entities:

- Norm Stamper, Seattle Chief of Police (Ret.)
- Jim Kenny, Democratic Party candidate, Snohomish County Prosecutor, and Assistant Seattle City Prosecuting Attorney
- Toby Nixon, former Washington State Rep. (R-Kirkland)
- Dr. Lester Grinspoon, MD, faculty emeritus, Harvard Medical School, Department of Psychiatry, and author of "Marihuana Reconsidered"
- Washington State Democratic Party
- NORML – National Organization for the Reform of Marijuana Laws
- NORML – Washington State Chapter
- King County Democratic Central Committee
- Libertarian Party of Washington
- Whatcom County Democrats
- 23rd Legislative District Democrats
- 30th Legislative District Democrats
- 37th Legislative District Democrats
- 39th Legislative District Democrats
- 41st Legislative District Democrats
- Tacoma Hemp Company
- Pierce County WA NORML Chapter
- Grammas for Ganja

== See also ==
- Decriminalization of non-medical cannabis in the United States
- Oregon Cannabis Tax Act
- Regulate, Control and Tax Cannabis Act of 2010 (California initiative)
- Washington Initiative 692 (1998)
- 2012 Washington Initiative 502

== External references ==
- Sensible Washington Approve Initiative 1068 Campaign
- Seattle Weekly Q&A Interview with Doug Hiatt, co-author of I-1068, about I-1068
