= Police ranks of the United States =

Structure of status and authority among police units in the USA

The United States police rank model is generally quasi-military in structure. A uniform system of insignia based on that of the US Military Police of the Army National Guard is used to help identify an officer's seniority.

== Ranks ==
Although the large and varied number of federal, state, and local police and sheriff's departments have different ranks, a general model, from highest to lowest rank, would be:

- Chief of police/commissioner of police/superintendent/sheriff/public safety director: The title commissioner of police is used mainly by large metropolitan departments, while chief of police is associated with small and medium-sized municipalities; both are typically appointed by a mayor or selected by the city council or commission. In some cities, a "commissioner" is a member of the board of officials in charge of the department, while a "chief" is the top uniformed officer answering to the commissioner or commission. In very large departments, such as the New York City Police Department, there may be several non-police officer deputies and assistant commissioners, some of whom outrank the chief of department and others on par with the uniformed chief. There may be a chief of operations who is second in command to the top-ranking chief. In contrast, sheriffs in the United States are usually elected officials, one in each county, who head the sheriff's department (or sheriff's office).
- Assistant chief of police/undersheriff/assistant commissioner/assistant superintendent: Only seen in some departments. In New York City, assistant chiefs head borough commands.
- Deputy chief of police/deputy commissioner/deputy superintendent/chief deputy/assistant sheriff: The top subordinate of the chief of police, commissioner, superintendent, or sheriff; may or may not have a specific area of responsibility. In some places the undersheriff is the warden of the county jail. The New York City Sheriff's Office has five undersheriffs: each one is responsible for a borough of New York City, with the Sheriff of the City of New York overseeing all of them. In some Sheriff's Offices, the rank of Assistant Sheriff exists, below the Undersheriff, but still above Commander and other ranks.
- Inspector/commander: Sometimes have an insignia of a single star, analogous to brigadier generals, but in other areas wear a gold or silver eagle, similar to a colonel. "Inspector" is also used as a term for "detective" in the San Francisco Police Department but is two ranks above captain in the NYPD and the Philadelphia Police Department. In the NYPD, inspectors command divisions, which may be groups of precincts within a borough or "director, deputy director", "Chief, Deputy Chief", etc. Conversely, the colonel or lieutenant colonel rank is rarely employed by other agencies, though it is used by the Baltimore Police Department and other Maryland agencies as either an executive or commander-like rank. Colonels generally wear the gold or silver eagle of a military colonel, and lieutenant colonels have the oak leaf of a Military lieutenant colonel, from the U.S. armed forces. Many sheriffs also wear the eagle insignia, and use colonel as an official rank.
- Major/deputy inspector: Sometimes Majors/Deputy Inspectors have the insignia of a gold or silver oak leaf, similar to a major or lieutenant colonel in the armed forces. In the Baltimore Police Department and Atlanta Police Department, majors supervise police stations.
- Captain: Two gold or silver bars ("railroad tracks"). A Captain often supervises a police station but can supervise another division or unit (detectives, patrol, etc.) in smaller departments and only certain sections of a police station in larger departments. In the NYPD, captains are the normal commanders of precincts.
- Lieutenant: Wearing a single gold or silver bar ("butterbars"), a lieutenant supervises two to three or more sergeants. Lieutenants can supervise an entire watch shift in a police station or detective squad (narcotics, homicide, etc.) in larger police departments, entire barracks in state police departments, and entire precincts in smaller police departments.
- Sergeant: Three chevrons, a police officer who supervises an entire watch shift in smaller departments and areas of a precinct and individual detective squads in larger departments. Some agencies, such as the New Jersey State Police, use a para-militaristic range of sergeant ranks, such as staff sergeant and sergeant first class, in addition to the basic sergeant rank.
- Detective/inspector/investigator: An inspector/detective/investigator usually works in plainclothes. This may be in several classes that correspond to higher supervisory and pay grades. In the NYPD, the detective rank is technically a designation: detectives do not actually outrank police officers although they are in charge of cases and are often senior in years of service and so have a certain degree of authority beyond police officers in specific situations. Detectives also perform undercover duties for some of their cases.
- Officer/deputy/trooper/corporal/public safety officer: A regular officer or deputy wears no rank insignia, and there may be several pay grades. Corporals, who may be senior officers or acting watch commanders, wear two chevrons. A police corporal is generally employed as an officer as an entry level supervisor position. These duties may include one or more of the following roles:
  Police corporals often wear the two chevrons originated by their military counterparts.
  - Detective
  - Division supervisor
  - Field training officer (FTO) (in some departments, field training officers are not given any supervisory powers and hold no higher rank than other officers).

Police corporals will often act as a lead officer in field situations when a sergeant is not present. The position is also referred to by some agencies as Agent.

In a few departments, such as New York City, Washington, D.C. and Baltimore, officers from the rank of lieutenant and up wear white shirts instead of the dark blue or black uniform shirts common to lower-ranked police officers. In Philadelphia the rank of sergeant and up wear white shirts. Command staff and ranking officers/supervisors may wear fretting ("scrambled eggs") on their hat visors.

Advancement from officer to captain is generally by appointment after successful completion of a series of examinations, and after the officer has sufficient time in grade. Grades above captain are generally by appointment of the chief or sheriff. In addition, there must be vacancies for a higher rank. In police departments, the second-highest rank is usually similar to a chief of staff. In a sheriff's office, the second-highest ranking person is often responsible for most operations, similar to a chief of police in a police department, because the Sheriff is often elected and in many cases is a politician rather than an experienced law enforcement officer.

== Variations ==
=== Federal ===
Federal

United States Border Patrol

| Border Patrol Headquarters | Chief Superintendent of the Border Patrol | Deputy Chief Superintendent of the Border Patrol | Deputy division chief | Associate chief | Assistant chief | | | | Operations officer (non-supervisory) | | | | | |
| Border Patrol sectors | | | Chief patrol agent (CPA) | Deputy chief patrol agent (DCPA) | Division chief/ACTT director | Executive officer/assistant chief patrol agent (ACPA) | | | Special operations supervisor (SOS) | Operations officer (non-supervisory) | Supervisory Border Patrol agent (SBPA) | | Border Patrol agent – intelligence (BPA-I) | |
| Border Patrol stations | | | | | | Patrol agent in charge (PAIC) | Deputy patrol agent in charge (DPAIC) | Watch commander (WC) | Special operations supervisor (SOS | | Supervisory Border Patrol agent (SBPA) | | Border Patrol agent – intelligence (BPA-I) | Border patrol agent (BPA) |
| Border Patrol academy | | | Chief patrol agent (CPA) | Deputy chief patrol agent (DCPA) | | Assistant chief patrol agent (ACPA) | Training operations supervisor (TOS) | | Supervisory Border Patrol agent (senior instructor) | | Supervisory Border Patrol agent (instructor) | Border Patrol agent (detailed instructor) | | |
| Insignia | | | | | | | | | | | | | No insignia | |

United States Capitol Police

| Rank | Chief of Police | Assistant Chief of Police/ Chief of Operations | Deputy Chief | Inspector | Captain | Lieutenant | Sergeant | Detective/MPO | Technician | Private First Class | Private with Training | Private |
| Insignia | | | | | | | | | | | | No insignia |

United States Park Police

| Rank | Chief of Police | Assistant Chief | Deputy Chief | Major | Captain | Lieutenant | Sergeant | Private/Investigator |
| Insignia | | | | | | | | No insignia |

United States Marshals Service

| Rank | Director | Deputy Director | US Marshal | Chief Deputy US Marshal | Supervisory Deputy US Marshal | Deputy US Marshal |

United States Secret Service

| Rank | Director | Deputy Director | Chief Operating Officer | Assistant Director | Deputy Assistant Director | Special Agent in Charge | Deputy Special Agent in Charge | Supervisory Special Agent | Special Agent |

Federal Bureau of Investigation

| Rank | Director | Deputy Director | Chief of Staff and Special Counsel to the Director | Deputy Chief of Staff | Associate Deputy Director | Executive Assistant Director | Associate Executive Assistant Director | Assistant Director | Deputy Assistant Director | Special Agent-in-Charge | Assistant Special Agent-in-Charge | Supervisory Special Agent | Senior Special Agent | Special Agent | Agent In Training |

United States Department of Veterans Affairs

| Rank | Chief of Police | Deputy Chief of Police | Major | Captain | Lieutenant | Sergeant | Detective | Corporal | Police Officer |
| Insignia | | | | | | | | | No insignia |
| Description | Chief of Service. Responsible for the entirety of the Police Service. | Deputy Chief of Service. Charged with assisting the Chief of Police in running the entirety of the Police Service. | Supervisory Police Officer or Supervisory Security Specialist. This position is equivalent in grade to a Captain. However, this rank is awarded to those officers specifically charged with overseeing patrol operations. | Supervisory Police Officer or Supervisory Security Specialist. Usually commands a section or division within the Service, such as Physical Security, Administration, Investigations, Communications etc. | Supervisory Police Officers (Watch Commanders). Supervises a shift (or multiple shifts) of Police and Security personnel, including Police Officers, Sergeants, and Security Assistants (Dispatchers). | Lead Police Officers (Watch Leaders). Assists the Watch Commander in running a shift of Police Officers and Security Assistants (Dispatchers). First line leaders within the Service. | Detectives are police investigators charged with investigating those crimes that do not fall under the purview of the VA Inspector General's Office (OIG). | This rank is authorized at the local level. It is the same grade as a journeyman level police officer. Generally, this rank is awarded to those officers who hold a special certification or responsibility. | Charged with performing a wide array of policing duties with the jurisdiction of VA. |

=== State ===
State

Alabama
Alabama Highway Patrol and Alabama Department of Public Safety

| Rank | Director (colonel) | Assistant director (lieutenant colonel) | Chief (major) | Captain | Lieutenant | Sergeant | Corporal | Senior trooper | Trooper |
| Insignia | | | | | | | | No insignia | |

Alaska

| Rank | Commissioner | Deputy Commissioner | Colonel | Major | Captain | Lieutenant | Sergeant | Corporal | Trooper |
| Insignia | | | | | | | | | No insignia |

Arizona
Arizona Department of Public Safety

| Rank | Director (Colonel) | Deputy Director (Lieutenant colonel) | Assistant Director (Lieutenant colonel) | Major | Captain | Sergeant | Trooper |
| Insignia | | | | | | | No insignia |

Arizona Rangers

| Rank | Captain | Sergeant | Ranger |
| Insignia | | | No insignia |

Arkansas

| Rank | Director (Colonel) | Deputy Director (Lieutenant colonel) | Major | Captain | Lieutenant | Sergeant | Corporal | Trooper First Class | Trooper | Cadet |
| Insignia | | | | | | | | | No insignia | |
| Description | Director holds the Rank of Colonel, appointed by the Governor of Arkansas to be the professional head of the Department. | Deputy Director holds the Rank of Lieutenant Colonel, second-in-command of Department and second highest ranked commissioned officer in the Department. | Responsible for serving as a Highway Patrol Regional Commander, as the Criminal Investigations Commander, as the Crimes Against Children Commander, or as the Administrative Services Division Commander. | Responsible for serving as a Highway Patrol Troop Commander, Criminal Investigation Division Regional Commander or other upper-level administrative and managerial staff position. | Responsible for serving as a Highway Patrol Troop Assistant Commander, Criminal Investigation Division Company Commander or supervising a specialized function with the State Police. | First supervisory rank, responsible for overseeing and supervising Troopers and non-commissioned personnel in the performance of their duties. | Rank attained by Trooper First Class after completion of 7 years of service. May supervise Troopers in the performance of their duties in absence of a sergeant. | Rank attained by Trooper after completion of 4 1/2 years of service. | Rank attained by Cadets upon successful completion of the training academy, responsible for field law enforcement patrol or specialized or technical law enforcement function. | A Cadet is a new recruit, and is the rank held by all personnel while assigned as a student at the training academy. These personnel do not wear rank insignia. |

California
California Highway Patrol

| Rank | Commissioner | Deputy Commissioner | Assistant Commissioner | Chief | Assistant Chief | Captain | Lieutenant | Sergeant | Officer | Cadet |
| Insignia | OR | | | | | | | | No insignia | |

California State Parks Peace Officer

| Rank | Director | Chief Deputy Director/ Deputy Director, Park Operations | Deputy Director | Division Chief | Superintendent V/ Superintendent IV | Superintendent III | Superintendent II | Superintendent I | Supervisor | Ranger | Cadet |
| Insignia | | | | | | | | | | No insignia | |

Colorado

| Rank | Colonel | Deputy Chief | Lieutenant Colonel | Major | Captain | Sergeant Major | Master Sergeant | Sergeant | Corporal | Master Trooper and Technician | Trooper |
| Insignia | | | | | | | | | | | No insignia |
| Description | Chief of the Patrol | | Region Commander | District/Branch Commander | Troop/Section Commander | | | | | | |

Connecticut

| Rank | Colonel | Lieutenant Colonel | Major | Captain | Lieutenant | Master Sergeant | Sergeant | Trooper First Class | Trooper |
| Insignia | | | | | | | | | No insignia |

Delaware

| Rank | Colonel | Lieutenant colonel | Major | Captain | Lieutenant | Sergeant | Master corporal | Senior corporal | Corporal grade 1 | Corporal | Trooper 1st class | Trooper |
| Insignia | | | | | | | | | | | | No insignia |
| Description | Superintendent of the Delaware State Police. | Second in Command of the Delaware State Police. | Member of the Executive Staff in charge of a specific duty. | Troop Commander of a Patrol Troop, or Commander of a specialized unit. | Assistant Troop Commander, oversees the Troop's criminal or traffic activities or oversees a specialized unit. | Road supervisor for Troopers, or Supervisor of a specialty unit. | Troopers with 16+ years of experience. | Troopers with 12–16 years of experience. | Troopers with 8–12 years of experience. | Troopers with 4–8 years of experience. | Troopers with 2–4 years of experience. | New Troopers who have graduated the Delaware State Police Training Academy. |

Florida

| Rank | Colonel | Lieutenant Colonel | Chief | Major | Captain | Lieutenant | Master Sergeant | Sergeant First Class | Staff Sergeant | Sergeant | Master Corporal | Senior Corporal | Corporal | Master Trooper | Senior Trooper | Trooper First Class | Trooper Specialist | Trooper; Auxiliary Trooper | Recruit |
| Insignia | | | | | | | | | | | | | FHP Corporal 2018 | | | | | No insignia | |

Georgia

| Rank | Colonel | Lieutenant Colonel | Major | Captain | Lieutenant | Sergeant First Class | Sergeant | Corporal | Trooper First Class | Trooper |
| Insignia | | | | | | | | | No insignia | |
| Description | Commissioner | Deputy Commissioner | Area Commander | Region Commander | Watch Commander | Post Chief | Post Chief | | | |

Hawaii

| Rank | Insignia |
|---|---|
| Agency Director (EM-07) | |
| Deputy Director (EM-05) | |
| Division Chief (EM-03) | |
| Colonel / Investigator -VI (SR-26) | |
| Commander / Investigator-Va (SR-24) | |
| Captain / Investigator-Vb (SR-24) | |
| Lieutenant / Investigator-IV (SR-22) | |
| Sergeant / Investigator-III (SR-20) | |
| Corporal / Investigator -II (SR-18) | |
| Officer / Investigator -I (SR-16) | |

Idaho

| Rank | Colonel | Lieutenant Colonel | Major | Captain | Lieutenant | Sergeant | Trooper |
| Insignia | | | | | | | No insignia |

Illinois

| Rank | Director | First Deputy Director | Colonel | Lieutenant Colonel | Major | Captain | Lieutenant | Master Sergeant | Sergeant | Master Trooper | Trooper First Class | Trooper |
| Insignia | | | | | | | | | | | | No insignia |

Indiana

| Rank | Superintendent | Colonel | Lieutenant Colonel | Major | Captain | Lieutenant | First Sergeant | Sergeant | Corporal | Trooper | Probationary Trooper | Recruit |
| Insignia | | | | | | | | | | No insignia | | |

Iowa

| Rank | Superintendent | Major | Captain | Lieutenant | Sergeant | Trooper III (Senior Trooper) | Trooper II | Trooper I | Peace Officer Candidate Current |
| Insignia | | | | | | No insignia | | | |

Kansas

| Rank | Superintendent (Colonel) | Assistant Superintendent (Lieutenant colonel) | Major | Captain | Lieutenant | Technical Trooper | Master Trooper | Trooper | Trooper Trainee (Recruit) |
| Insignia | | | | | | No insignia | | | |
| Description | Rank of colonel, appointed by the Governor of Kansas to be the professional head of the Department | Rank of lieutenant colonel, second-in-command of Patrol, appointed by the Superintendent | Regional and Division Commanders | Troop Commander | First Line Supervisor | Rank held by veteran Troopers assigned to a technical specialty (e.g. Bomb Technicians, Aircraft Pilots, Canine Handlers, Task Force Officers, Commercial Vehicle Enforcement troopers). | Rank attained by Trooper after completion of 5 years of service and completion of advanced professional training. | Rank attained by Recruits upon successful completion of the training academy, responsible for field law enforcement patrol. | This rank is held by law enforcement officers while attending the KHP training academy. |

Kentucky

| Rank | Colonel-Commissioner | Lieutenant Colonel | Major | Captain | Lieutenant | Sergeant | Trooper |
| Insignia | | | | | | | No insignia |

Louisiana

| Rank | Colonel | Lieutenant Colonel | Major | Captain | Lieutenant | Sergeant | Master Trooper | Senior Trooper | Trooper First Class | Trooper | Cadet |
| Insignia | | | | | | | | | | | No insignia |
| Description | One individual is appointed (by the Governor) as the Deputy Secretary of the Department of Public Safety and Superintendent of the State Police and holds the rank of Colonel. The Colonel wears one gold-colored eagle on each epaulet. | There are four officers with the rank of Lieutenant Colonel, each overseeing one of the four bureaus within the State Police. Lieutenant Colonels wear a silver-colored oak leaf on each epaulet. | Majors are responsible for a command within the State Police. Majors wear one gold-colored oak leaf on each epaulet. | The specific responsibilities of a Captain vary depending upon where they are assigned within the Agency. For example, a Captain may be a Troop Commander in the Patrol Bureau or a Division Commander in one of the other Bureaus. Captains wear two gold-colored bars on each epaulet. | The responsibilities of a lieutenant vary within the department. At the Troop level, a lieutenant is typically the commander of a shift. Other Lieutenants in other divisions may command a unit. Lieutenants wear gold-colored metal bars on each epaulet. | Sergeants act as assistant shift commanders or duty officers. A sergeant is generally considered to be a first-line supervisor in most units. Sergeants wear three yellow inverted chevrons on each sleeve under the State Police patch. | The insignia for this rank consists of a gold-colored 'MT' collar pin worn on the wearer's right lapel. Troopers who complete fifteen (15) years of satisfactory or exceptional service are promoted to the rank of Master Trooper. While not considered a first-line supervisor, Master Troopers are occasionally tasked to supervise other lower-ranking Troopers | The insignia for this rank consists of a gold-colored 'ST' collar pin worn on the wearer's right lapel. Troopers who complete ten years of satisfactory or exceptional service are promoted to the rank of Senior Trooper. | The insignia for this rank consists of a gold-colored 'TFC' collar pin worn on the wearer's right lapel. Troopers who complete five years of satisfactory or exceptional service are promoted to the rank of Trooper First Class. | The insignia for this rank consists of a gold-colored 'TPR' collar pin worn on the wearer's right lapel. This rank is attained by Cadets upon successful completion of the training academy. | A Cadet is a raw recruit, and is the rank held by all personnel while assigned as a student at the training academy. These personnel do not wear rank insignia. |

Maine

| Title | Colonel | Lieutenant Colonel | Major | Lieutenant | Sergeant | Corporal | Trooper |
| Insignia | | | | | | | No insignia |

Maryland

| Rank | Colonel; Superintendent | Lieutenant Colonel | Major | Captain | Lieutenant | First Sergeant | Detective Sergeant | Sergeant | Corporal | Master Trooper | Senior Trooper | Trooper First Class | Trooper |
| Insignia | | | | | | | | | | | | | No insignia |
| Description | The Superintendent of the Maryland State Police holds the rank of colonel. He is the Secretary of the Department of State Police and a member of the governor's cabinet. | There are three officers with the rank of Lieutenant Colonel, each overseeing one of the three bureaus within the state police. | Majors are responsible for a command within the state police. | The specific responsibilities of a captain vary depending upon where they are assigned within the agency. For example, a captain may be a troop commander in the Field Operations Bureau or a division commander in one of the other bureaus. | A lieutenant is the commander of each barrack. Other Lieutenants may command a unit. | First sergeants are assistant barrack commanders or may perform administrative functions in other areas. | Detective sergeants are in charge of all criminal investigations at a barracks, or may be assigned to other investigative functions. | Sergeants act as shift commanders or duty officers. | Corporals are the first-line supervisors and are usually assigned as road supervisors within barracks. In the absence of a sergeant, they may act as the duty officer. | Troopers who complete 15 years of satisfactory or exceptional service are promoted to the rank of Master Trooper. | Troopers who complete 10 years of satisfactory or exceptional service are promoted to the rank of Senior Trooper. | Troopers who complete three years of satisfactory or exceptional service are promoted to the rank of TFC. | Candidates successfully completing the academy and field training are appointed as troopers. |

Massachusetts

| Rank | Colonel | Lieutenant Colonel | Major | Detective Captain | Captain | Detective Lieutenant | Lieutenant | Sergeant | | | Trooper | Probationary Trooper | State Police Trainee |
| Insignia | | | | | | | | | | | No insignia | | |
| Description | Superintendent | Deputy Superintendent or Division Commander | Troop Commander | Station Commander | | Deputy commander | | First-line supervisor | | | Standard patrol officer | | Trainee in State Police Academy |
| Ranks prior to 1992 | Colonel | Lieutenant Colonel | Major | Captain | | Lieutenant | | Staff Sergeant | Sergeant | Corporal | Trooper | Probationary Trooper | Recruit Trooper |
| Insignia prior to 1992 | | | | | | | | | | | No insignia | | |

Michigan

| Rank | Colonel | Lieutenant Colonel | Major | Captain | Inspector | First Lieutenant | Lieutenant | Sergeant | Trooper | Recruit |
| Insignia | | | | | | | | | No insignia | |

Minnesota

| Rank | Colonel | Lieutenant Colonel | Major | Captain | Lieutenant | Sergeant | Trooper |
| Insignia | | | | | | | No insignia |

Mississippi

| Rank | Colonel | Lieutenant Colonel | Major | Captain | Lieutenant | Master Sergeant | Sergeant First Class | Staff Sergeant | Sergeant | Corporal | Trooper First Class | Trooper | Cadet |
| Insignia | | | | | | | | | | | | No insignia | |

Missouri

| Rank | Superintendent (rank of Colonel) | Assistant Superintendent (rank of Lieutenant Colonel) | Major | Captain | Lieutenant | Master Sergeant | Sergeant | Corporal | Trooper | State Trooper (Recruit) |
| Insignia | | | | | | | | | No insignia | |
| Description | Superintendent Holds the rank of Colonel. Appointed by the Governor of Missouri. must be confirmed by the Missouri Senate | Assistant Superintendent holds the rank of Lieutenant Colonel and reports directly to the Superintendent and has authority over the units. | Majors are responsible for a command within the Highway Patrol. | A captain is a troop commander in the Field Operations Bureau or a division commander in one of the other bureaus. | A lieutenant is the assistant commander of a division/unit. | A Master Sergeant acts as a zone sergeant commanding a group of troopers. | A Sergeant supervises an entire Patrol shift of their respective District. | Corporals are the first-line supervisors and are usually assigned as road supervisors within barracks. In the absence of a sergeant, they may act as the duty officer. | Candidates successfully completing the academy and field training are appointed as troopers. | The initial rank of oncoming Missouri State Highway Patrol, held while undergoing training at the Missouri State Highway Patrol Law Enforcement Academy. |

Montana

Nebraska

Nevada

| Rank | Chief (rank of Colonel) | Assistant Chief (rank of Lieutenant colonel) | Major | Captain | Lieutenant | Sergeant | Trooper |
| Insignia | | | | | | | No insignia |
| Description | The Chief of Police holds the Rank of Colonel and is appointed by the Nevada Department of Public Safety (DPS) Director. The Chief of Police must be confirmed by the Governor of Nevada | The Assistant Chief holds the rank of Lieutenant Colonel and reports directly to the Colonel and has authority over the units. | Majors are responsible for a command within the Highway Patrol. | A captain is a troop commander in the Field Operations Bureau or a division commander in one of the other bureaus. | A lieutenant is the assistant commander of a division/unit. | A Sergeant is a person who supervises an entire Patrol shift in their District. | Candidates successfully completing the academy and field training are appointed as troopers. |

New Hampshire

New Jersey

| Rank | Colonel (Superintendent) | Lieutenant colonel (Deputy superintendent) | Major | Captain | Lieutenant | Sergeant First Class | Detective Sergeant First Class | Staff Sergeant | Sergeant / Detective Sergeant | Trooper I / Detective I | Trooper II / Detective II |
| Insignia | | | | | | | | | | | No insignia |

New Mexico

| Rank | Chief | Deputy Chief | Major | Captain | Lieutenant | Sergeant | Senior Officer | Officer |
| Insignia | | | | | | | No insignia | |

New York

| Rank | Superintendent | First Deputy Superintendent | Deputy Superintendent/Colonel | Assistant Deputy Superintendent/Lieutenant Colonel | Staff Inspector Superintendent | Major | Captain | Lieutenant | Technical Lieutenant | Chief Technical Sergeant | Staff Sergeant | First Sergeant | Senior Investigator (plainclothes) | Zone Sergeant | Sergeant Station Commander | Technical Sergeant | Sergeant | Investigator (plainclothes) | Trooper |
| Insignia | | | | | | | | | | | | | No insignia | | | | | No insignia | |

North Carolina

| Rank | Colonel | Lieutenant Colonel | Major | Captain | Lieutenant | First Sergeant | Sergeant | Master Trooper | Senior Trooper | Trooper | Probationary Trooper | Trooper Cadet |
| Insignia | | | | | | | | No insignia | | | | |
| Description | Patrol Commander Appointed by the Governor | Patrol Deputy Commander / Director of Support Operations | Support/Operations/Training/Professional Standards | Troop Commander / (1 per troop; others assigned to specific posts) | (3 per troop; others assigned to specific posts) | District Commander (1 per patrol district; others assigned to specific posts) | Shift Supervisor (3 per patrol district; others assigned to specific post) | Rank stated on badge (6+ years experience) | Rank stated on badge (3–6 years experience) | 6 months – 3 years experience | 0–6 months experience (field training) | Trooper School |

North Dakota

| Rank | Colonel | Major | Captain | Lieutenant | Sergeant | Trooper |
| Insignia | | | | | | No insignia |

Ohio

| Rank | Colonel | Lieutenant Colonel | Major | Captain | Staff Lieutenant | Lieutenant | Sergeant | Trooper |
| Insignia | | | | | | | | No insignia |

Oklahoma

| Rank | Commissioner | Assistant Commissioner | Chief (Colonel) | Assistant Chief (Lieutenant Colonel) | Deputy Chief (Lieutenant Colonel) | Major | Captain | Lieutenant | Trooper | Cadet |
| Insignia | | | | | | | | | | No insignia |
| Description | Appointed by the Governor of Oklahoma to serve as the head of the Oklahoma Department of Public Safety | Appointed by the commissioner to serve as the chief of Administrative and Support Services for the Oklahoma Department of Public Safety | Rank of colonel, appointed by the commissioner to be the professional head of the patrol, highest ranking uniformed officer | Rank of lieutenant colonel, position not used but still recognized | Rank of lieutenant colonel, responsible for overseeing patrol operations for assigned sections or performing administrative functions | Responsible for overseeing zones which consist of two or more troops of the patrol | Responsible for serving as a troop commander or performing a technical or specialized staff function | First supervisory rank, responsible for supervising troopers in the performance of their duties or performing a technical or specific staff function | Rank attained by Cadets upon successful completion of the training academy, responsible for field law enforcement patrol or specialized or technical law enforcement function | A Cadet is a new recruit, and is the rank held by all personnel while assigned as a student at the training academy. These personnel do not wear rank insignia. |

Oregon

| Rank | Superintendent | Deputy Superintendent | Major | Captain | Lieutenant | Sergeant | Senior Trooper | Trooper |
| Insignia | | | | | | | No insignia | No insignia |

Pennsylvania

| Rank | Colonel (Commissioner) | Lieutenant Colonel (Deputy Commissioner) | Major | Captain | Lieutenant | Sergeant | Corporal | Trooper First Class | Trooper | State Police Cadet |
| Insignia | | | | | | | | | No insignia | |
| Description | Commissioner of the Pennsylvania State Police. | Deputy Commissioner of the Pennsylvania State Police. | Commander of an Area, such as Area III, encompassing several Troops. | Troop Commander, such as Troop B, encompassing several Stations. | Station Commander, such as Station 1 (located in Troop B of Area III). | Station Commander, Supervisor of a unit, section, or specialty position. | Supervisor of Troopers, oversee the patrol's daily calls for service. | This is a longevity promotion for Troopers with 12 years of service. | Upon graduation from the Pennsylvania State Police Academy, cadets are promoted to the rank of Trooper. | A Commonwealth employee who is enrolled in but has not yet graduated from the Pennsylvania State Police Academy. |

Rhode Island

| Rank | Colonel Superintendent | Lieutenant Colonel Superintendent | Major | Captain | Lieutenant | Sergeant | Corporal | Trooper |
| Insignia | | | | | | | | No insignia |

South Carolina

| Rank | Colonel | Lieutenant Colonel | Major | Captain | Lieutenant | First Sergeant | Sergeant | Corporal | Master Trooper | Lance Corporal | Trooper First Class | Trooper |
| Insignia | | | | | | | | | | | | No insignia |
| Description | Commander of the South Carolina Highway Patrol | There are two Troopers who hold the position of Deputy Commander, Overeeing Operations and Administrations | There are four Majors in the SCHP. Overeeing Field Operations | A Captain commands one of ten Troops | A Lieutenant commands a post, or station | A First Sergeant is the second in command of a Post, or station | A Sergeant commands a patrol shift | A Corporal acts as a field supervisor | A Master Trooper has served for at least ten years | A Lance Corporal has served for at least five years | A Trooper First Class has served for at least three years | The base SCHP rank |

South Dakota

Tennessee

| Rank | Colonel | Lieutenant Colonel | Major | Captain | Lieutenant | Sergeant | Trooper |
| Insignia | | | | | | | No insignia |

Texas
Texas Highway Patrol

| Rank | DPS Director (Colonel) | Deputy Director (Lieutenant Colonel) | Chief | Major | Captain | Lieutenant | Master Sergeant | Sergeant | Corporal | Trooper | Probationary Trooper |
| Insignia | | | | | | | | | | No insignia | |

Texas Rangers

| Rank | Chief | Assistant Chief | Major | Captain | Lieutenant | Sergeant | Field Ranger |
| Insignia | | | | | | | No insignia |

Utah

| Rank | Colonel | Major | Captain | Lieutenant | Sergeant | Trooper |
| Insignia | | | | | | No insignia |

Virginia

| Rank | Colonel | Lieutenant Colonel | Major | Captain | Lieutenant | First Sergeant | Sergeant | Master Trooper | Senior Trooper | Trooper-Pilot | Trooper II | Trooper I | Trainee |
| Insignia | | | | | | | | No insignia | | | | | |
| Description | Superintendent of State Police | Deputy Superintendent (1) / Bureau Director (1 per bureau) / Office of Performance Management and Internal Controls (1) | Bureau Deputy Director (2 per bureau) | Division Commander | Field / Headquarters Lieutenant / Staff Assistant | Area Commander | First-line supervisor | Career Progression, based on length of service, 25+ years | Career Progression, based on length of service, 9+ years | Trooper's assigned to the Aviation Unit | Career Progression, automatic after 1 year probationary period | Probationary Trooper, first year in the field | Status while attending the state police academy |

Vermont

| Rank | Colonel | Lieutenant colonel | Major | Captain | Lieutenant | Senior Sergeant | Sergeant | Corporal | Trooper | Trooper Probationary |
| Insignia | | | | | | | | | | No insignia |
| Description | The Director of the Vermont State Police may be promoted to full colonel at the discretion of the Commissioner. | The Director of the Vermont State Police is a lieutenant colonel. The Commissioner of Public Safety makes this appointment for a term of three years. The director may be reappointed at the commissioner's discretion. This rank can also be issued to a deputy director, though actual use of such a position varies and is not always used. | Captains may be promoted to major on a case-by-case basis when the need arises. Currently the State Police has three majors, each overseeing one of the major divisions of the State Police i.e., Support Services, Field Force and Bureau of Criminal Investigation (BCI). | Lieutenants with 6 months of experience at that rank may be considered for promotion to captain. Each troop area is overseen by a captain. There are also a number of captains in staff positions. | Sergeants with three years of experience at that level may be considered for promotion to lieutenant. Lieutenants are commissioned officers and the rank generally includes station commanders as well as commanders of other specialized divisions within the State Police. All members hired after January 1, 1998, must possess a bachelor's degree from an accredited college or university to be eligible for a promotion to lieutenant. | Sergeants with 15 years of service are promoted to the rank of Senior Sergeant. | Troopers are eligible for consideration for promotion to sergeant after a minimum of five years with the department. Sergeants in the State Police are the first-line supervisors, typically referred to as patrol commanders. Many of the department's detectives also hold the rank of sergeant. All members hired after January 1, 1998, must possess an associate degree from an accredited college or university to be eligible for a promotion to sergeant. | Senior troopers are promoted to corporal upon completion of fifteen years of service. | Probationary troopers are promoted to the rank of trooper first class after one year of service with the department. | Trooper Probationary No rank insignia. This is the entry level rank of all members of the State Police. |

Washington

| Rank | Chief of the Washington State Patrol | Deputy Chief | Assistant Chief | Captain | Lieutenant | Sergeant | State Trooper | Trooper Cadet |
| Insignia | | | | | | | No insignia | |

West Virginia

| Rank | Superintendent - Colonel | Lieutenant Colonel | Major | Captain | First Lieutenant | Second Lieutenant | First Sergeant | Sergeant | Corporal | Trooper First Class | Senior Trooper | Trooper |
| Insignia | | | | | | | | | | | | No insignia |

Wisconsin

| Rank | Superintendent | Colonel | Lieutenant Colonel | Major | Captain | Lieutenant | Sergeant | Master Trooper / Inspector | Senior Trooper / Inspector | Trooper / Inspector | Probationary Trooper / Probationary Inspector |
| Insignia | | | | | | | | | | | |

Wyoming

| Rank | Colonel | Lieutenant Colonel | Major | Captain | Lieutenant | Sergeant | Trooper |
| Insignia | | | | | | | No insignia |

=== County ===
County

Anne Arundel County, Maryland

| Rank | Chief of Police | Deputy Chief | Major | Captain | Lieutenant | Sergeant | Corporal | Police First Class | Police Officer |
| Insignia | | | | | | | | | No insignia |

Baltimore County, Maryland

| Rank | Chief Of Police | Colonel | Major | Captain | Lieutenant | Sergeant | Corporal | Police Officer First Class | Police Officer | Police Recruit | Police Cadet |
| Insignia | | | | | | | | | No insignia | | |

Denver County, Colorado

| Rank | Sheriff | Division Chief | Major | Captain | Sergeant | Deputy |
| Insignia | | | | | | No insignia |

East Baton Rouge, Louisiana

| Rank | Sheriff | Colonel | Lieutenant Colonel | Major | Captain | Lieutenant | Sergeant | Corporal | Deputy Sheriff |
| Insignia | | | | | | | | | No insignia |
| Description | The sheriff is the chief law enforcement officer for East Baton Rouge Parish. The sheriff wears four gold stars on each shoulder. Sheriff Sid J. Gautreaux, III | The colonel is the Chief Criminal Deputy of the sheriff's office. Ultimately all divisions of the sheriff's office fall under the guidance of the colonel. The colonel wears a silver eagle on each shoulder. Colonel Lawrence McCleary, Chief Criminal Deputy; Stephen Hymel, Chief Civil Deputy | The lieutenant colonel is primarily responsible for the criminal division of the sheriff's office. The lieutenant colonel wears a silver oak leaf on each shoulder. Lieutenant Colonel Dennis Grimes is the Warden at East Baton Rouge Parish Prison. (Warden) | There are four majors in the East Baton Rouge Sheriff's Office. Majors wear a gold oak leaf on each shoulder. Major Ron Boucher, Chief of Detectives; Major Michael Crawford, Chief of Operations; Major Robert Clements, Deputy Warden of the Parish Prison | Captains are commanders of their particular division such as: Kleinpeter Substation, Criminal Investigations, Crime Scene etc... Captains are ultimately responsible for the performance and conduct of the deputies in their command. The sheriff's office has approximately 12+ captains. Captains wear two gold bars on each shoulder. | Lieutenants are shift supervisors. They are responsible for all of the activity on their respective shifts and for ensuring the deputies are serving the citizens and enforcing the laws properly. Lieutenants wear a single gold bar on each shoulder. | Sergeants are assistant shift supervisors. The shift sergeant assists the shift lieutenant with day-to-day activities of his shift and the supervision of deputies under their command. Sergeants must perform patrol activities as well as knowing about the shift as he is the acting shift supervisor when needed. Sergeants wear three inverted chevrons on the uniform shirt collar. | Corporals are first line supervisors who assist the shift sergeants and lieutenants with supervising deputies under their command. Unlike many law enforcement agencies where the rank of corporal is given after a certain period of service, corporals with the Sheriff's office are promoted much like sergeants and are supervisors who routinely perform the job of acting sergeant or scene supervisor when necessary. Corporals wear two inverted chevrons on the uniform shirt collar. | The position of deputy sheriff is the entry job title of the Sheriff's Office. Even after they are promoted or transferred they are still a deputy sheriff as they serve under the sheriff. Deputies do not wear rank insignia. |

Jefferson County, Colorado

| Rank | Sheriff | Undersheriff | Division Chief | Commander | Sergeant | Deputy |
| Insignia | | | | | | No insignia |

Kern County, California

| Rank | Sheriff | Undersheriff | Chief Deputy | Commander | Lieutenant | Sergeant | Senior Deputy | Deputy |
| Insignia | | | | | | | | No insignia |

Los Angeles County, California

| Rank | Sheriff | Undersheriff | Assistant sheriff | Division Chief | Commander | Captain | Lieutenant | Sergeant | Deputy sheriff (BONUS II) (Master Field Training Officer / Detective / Custody Senior Deputy) | Deputy sheriff (BONUS I) (Field Training Officer + various other assignments in Bureaus & Details) | Deputy sheriff (Patrol Deputy, Line Deputy + other assignments) | Deputy sheriff trainee |
| Insignia | | | | | | | | | Master FTO Rank LASD | | No insignia | |

Maricopa, Arizona

| Rank | Sheriff | Chief Deputy | Executive Chief | Deputy Chief | Captain | Lieutenant | Sergeant | Deputy or Detention Officer |
| Insignia | | | | | | | | No insignia |

Central Marin, California

| Rank | Chief of Police | Captain | Lieutenant | Sergeant | Corporal | Police Officer |
| Insignia | | | | | | No insignia |

Miami-Dade, Florida

| Rank | Director | Deputy Director | Assistant Director | Deputy Chief or Division Chief | Major | Bureau Commander | Captain | Lieutenant | Sergeant | Police Officer |
| Insignia | | | | | | | | | | No insignia |

Nassau County, New York

| Rank | Police Commissioner | Chief of Department | Chief of Division | Assistant Chief | Deputy Chief | Inspector | Deputy Inspector | Detective Captain or Captain | Detective Lieutenant or Lieutenant | Detective Sergeant or Sergeant | Detective or Police Officer |
| Insignia | | | | | | | | | | | No insignia |

Orange County, California

| Rank | Sheriff | Undersheriff | Assistant Sheriff | Commander | Captain | Lieutenant | Sergeant | Investigator | Master Field Training Officer | Deputy Sheriff II | Deputy Sheriff I |
| Insignia | | | | | | | | | | No insignia | |

Pima County, Arizona

| Rank | Sheriff | Chief | Captain | Lieutenant | Sergeant | Detective | Deputy |
| Insignia | | | | | | No insignia | |

Riverside County, California

| Rank | Sheriff | Undersheriff | Assistant Sheriff | Chief Deputy | Captain | Lieutenant | Sergeant | Master Investigator | Investigator | Corporal | Deputy Sheriff |
| Insignia | | | | | | | | | | | No insignia |
| Description | | | | | | | | | There are four ranks as part of the Career Investigator Program: Investigator I, Investigator II (Senior Investigator), Investigator III (Lead Investigator), and Investigator IV (Master Investigator). | There is only one rank as a Corporal: Corporal I. A Corporal's role is to assist mainly the Sergeant and/or the Lieutenant with overseeing of Probationary Deputies and other Deputies in that division. When a member of the Riverside County Sheriff is promoted to Corporal he/she receives a new uniform with a Corporal Insignia placed on the upper left and right arm underneath the Riverside County Sheriff emblem/insignia. | There are three Deputy Sheriff grades (currently used only for pay grade identification): Deputy Sheriff, Deputy Sheriff A (possesses CA intermediate POST certificate), and Deputy Sheriff B (possesses CA advanced POST certificate). Deputy Sheriff's distinguish themselves from Correctional Deputies and Deputy Coroners by having a yellow stripe down the side of their pants. Correctional Deputies and Deputy Coroners also wear a black tie while Deputy Sheriffs wear a green tie. |

St. Louis, Missouri

| Rank | Chief of Police | Deputy Chief of Police | Captain | Lieutenant | Sergeant | Detective | Police Officer | Probationary Police Officer |
| Insignia | | | | | | No insignia | | |

San Bernardino County, California (Probation)

| Rank | Chief | Deputy Chief | Director II | Director I | Probation Supervisor II | Probation Supervisor I | Probation Officer II | Probation Officer I |
| Insignia | | | | | | | No insignia | |

San Diego County, California

| Rank | Sheriff | Undersheriff | Assistant Sheriff | Commander | Captain | Lieutenant | Sergeant | Corporal | Deputy Sheriff |
| Insignia | | | | | | | | | No insignia |

San Francisco County, California

| Rank | Sheriff | Undersheriff | Assistant Sheriff | Chief Deputy | Captain | Lieutenant | Sergeant | Senior Deputy | Deputy |
| Insignia | | | | | | | | | No insignia |

Santa Barbara County, California

| Rank | Sheriff | Undersheriff | Chief Deputy | Commander | Lieutenant | Sergeant | Senior Deputy | Deputy |
| Insignia | | | | | | | | No insignia |

Santa Clara County, California

| Rank | Sheriff | Undersheriff | Assistant Sheriff | Captain | Lieutenant | Sergeant | Deputy Sheriff |
| Insignia | | | | | | | No insignia |

Saratoga County, New York

| Rank | Sheriff | Undersheriff | Chief Deputy | Colonel | Captain | Lieutenant | Sergeant | Deputy |
| Insignia | | | | | | | | No insignia |

Shelby County, Tennessee

| Rank | Sheriff | Chief Deputy/Jailer | Assistant Chief Deputy/Jailer | Chief Inspector | Captain | Lieutenant | Sergeant | Detective | Deputy |
| Insignia | | | | | | | | No insignia | |

Nashville-Davidson County, Tennessee

| Rank | Sheriff/Chief Deputy | Chief of Operations | Lieutenant | Sergeant | Corporal | Deputy |
| Insignia | | | | | | No insignia |

Suffolk County Police, New York

| Rank | Police Commissioner | Chief of Department | Chief of Division | Assistant Chief | Deputy Chief | Inspector | Deputy Inspector | Captain | Lieutenant | Sergeant | Police Officer/Detective |
| Insignia | | | | | | | | | | | No insignia |

Suffolk County Sheriff, New York

| Rank | Sheriff | Undersheriff | Chief Deputy Sheriff/ Chief of Staff/ Warden | Warden | Deputy Warden | Captain/ Investigator Captain | Lieutenant/ Investigator Lieutenant | Sergeant/Investigator Sergeant | Deputy Sheriff/ Correction Officer/ Deputy Sheriff Investigator/ Correction Officer Investigator |
| Insignia | | | | | | | | | No insignia |

Sullivan County, Tennessee

| Rank | Sheriff | Chief Deputy | Assistant Chief | Captain | Lieutenant | Sergeant | Deputy/Detective |
| Insignia | | | | | | | No insignia |

Ventura County, California

| Rank | Sheriff | Undersheriff | Assistant sheriff | Commander | Captain | Sergeant | Senior deputy sheriff | Deputy sheriff |
| Insignia | | | | | | | | No insignia |

=== City ===
City

Albuquerque

| Rank | Chief of Police | Deputy Chief of Police | Chief of Staff | Deputy Chief of Staff | Commander | Lieutenant | Sergeant | Police Officer/Detective |
| Insignia | | | | | | | | No insignia |

Atlanta

| Rank | Chief of Police | Assistant Chief | Deputy Chief | Major | Captain | Lieutenant | Sergeant | Investigator | Senior Police Officer | Police Officer |
| Insignia | | | | | | | | No insignia | | |

Aurora

| Rank | Chief of Police | Deputy Chief | Division Chief | Commander | Captain | Lieutenant | Sergeant | Police Agent | Police Officer Specialist | Police Officer | Police Cadet |
| Insignia | | | | | | | | | | No insignia | |

Austin

| Rank | Chief of Police | Chief of Staff | Assistant Chief | Commander | Lieutenant | Sergeant (10 years seniority) | Sergeant | Corporal/ Detective | Senior Police Officer | Police Officer | Recruit |
| Insignia | | | | | | | | | No insignia | | |

Bakersfield

| Rank | Chief of Police | Assistant Chief | Captain | Lieutenant | Sergeant | Detective | Senior Officer | Officer |
| Insignia | | | | | | | | No insignia |

Baltimore

| Rank | Police Commissioner | Deputy Police Commissioner | Colonel | Lieutenant Colonel | Major | Captain | Lieutenant | Sergeant | Police Officer / Detective | Police Trainee |
| Insignia | | | | | | | | | No insignia | |

Bishop

| Rank | Chief | Lieutenant | Sergeant | Police Officer |
| Insignia | | | | No insignia |

Boston

| Rank | Commissioner (civilian) | Superintendent In Chief | Superintendent | Deputy Superintendent | Captain/Captain Detective | Lieutenant/Lieutenant Detective | Sergeant/Sergeant Detective | Detective | Police Officer |
| Insignia | No insignia | | | | | | | No insignia | |
| Description | The Commissioner is appointed by the Mayor of Boston. The Commissioner is the executive head of the department. | The Superintendent in Chief is the highest-ranking police officer in the department. This position is not always filled. | Superintendents are typically in charge of a Bureau, or they can be the director of the academy. | Deputy Superintendents are typically second-in-command of a Bureau, or the deputy director of the academy. | Captains are typically commanders in charge of a district, or unit commander in academy, or service chief in the department administration | Lieutenants are in charge of holding the functions of being second-in-command of their respective district, or Unit leader in district, or service chief in the department administration, or instructor in academy, etc. | Sergeants are responsible for holding the functions of district sergeant, or unit deputy chief in district or staff sergeant in the department administration, or instructor in academy, etc. | Detective is a rank, guaranteed by a Legislative Act of 1986, they work in civil clothes and hold the function of an investigator. | Police Officers are the first ranking officers. |

Charlotte

| Rank | Chief of Police | Assistant Chief | Deputy Chief | Major | Captain | Lieutenant | Sergeant | Detective | Police Officer |
| Insignia | | | | | | | | No insignia | |

Chicago

| Rank | Superintendent of Police | First Deputy Superintendent of Police | Chief | Deputy chief | Commander | Captain | Lieutenant | Sergeant | Field training officer | Police officer/assigned as: detective/youth officer/gang specialist/police agent/major accident investigator/ etc. | Police officer |
| Insignia | | | | | | | | | | No insignia | |
| Description | Appointed by the Mayor of Chicago. Highest rank in the Chicago Police Department. | Appointed by the Superintendent of Police. Second Highest rank in the Chicago Police Department. | Rank since September 8, 2011. Chiefs are typically in charge of a Bureau. | Rank since September 8, 2011. | Commanders are typically in charge of a district. | Captains are typically Executive Officers of Districts. | | | Field training officers wear one chevron over one rocker, with "FTO" in the center of the insignia, but are not considered ranking officers. | Chicago detectives are not considered ranking officers, but rather officers assigned to specialized units, e.g. violent crimes, robbery, gang and narcotics (NAGIS), Internal Affairs Division (IAD), Major Accident Investigation Section (MAIS), etc. (Unless they hold the rank of sergeant or above.) | Police officers are the first ranking officers. They are dispatched radio assignments, conduct patrol, and respond to other emergencies as needed. |

Cleveland

| Rank | Chief | Deputy Chief | Commander | Captain | Lieutenant | Sergeant | Field Training Officer | Police Officer |
| Insignia | | | | | | | No insignia | |

Cincinnati

| Rank | Chief | Executive Assistant Chief | Assistant Chief | Captain | Lieutenant | Sergeant | Police Officer |
| Insignia | | | | | | | No insignia |

Colorado Springs

| Rank | Chief of police | Deputy chief | Commander | Lieutenant | Sergeant | Police officer/Detective |
| Insignia | | | | | | No insignia |

Columbus

| Rank | Chief of police | Assistant Chief | Deputy Chief | Commander | Lieutenant | Sergeant | Police Officer |
| Insignia | | | | | | | No insignia |

Dallas

| Rank | Chief | Executive Assistant Chief | Assistant Chief | Deputy Chief | Major | Captain | Lieutenant | Sergeant | Senior Corporal | Police Officer |
| Insignia | | | | | | | | | | No insignia |

Denver

| Rank | Chief of Police | Deputy Chief | Commander | Captain | Lieutenant | Sergeant | Corporal | Technician | Police Officer |
| Insignia | | | | | | | | No insignia | |
| Description | | Appointed by the Chief of Police from Commander and Captain ranks. | Appointed by the Chief of Police from Lieutenant and Captain ranks. | Promotion based on panel interview/departmental assessment. Current rank is no longer used it now goes from Lieutenant to Commander. | Promotion based on a written examination and panel interview/departmental assessment. | Promotion based on a written examination and panel interview/departmental assessment. | At least one year service as a technician before eligibility for promotion to corporal (after an additional written examination and interview). | At least three years service as a police officer before eligibility for promotion to Technician (after an additional written examination and interview). | 4th through 1st Class |

Detroit

| Rank | Chief | Assistant chief | Deputy chief | Commander | Captain | Lieutenant | Sergeant | Detective | Neighborhood police officer | Corporal | Police officer | Reserve officer |
| Insignia | | | | | | | | | | | No insignia | |

El Paso

| Rank | Chief | Assistant chief | Commander | Lieutenant | Sergeant | Patrol Officer (20 years seniority) | Patrol Officer (15 years seniority) | Patrol Officer (10 years seniority) | Patrol Officer (5 years seniority) | Patrol Officer |
| Insignia | | | | | | | | | | No insignia |

Fort Worth

| Rank | Chief of Police | Assistant Chief | Deputy Chief | Commander | Captain | Lieutenant | Sergeant | Corporal/Detective | Police Officer |
| Insignia | | | | | | | | | No insignia |

Fresno

| Rank | Chief of Police | Deputy Chief | Captain | Lieutenant | Sergeant | Corporal | Police Officer |
| Insignia | | | | | | No insignia | |

Honolulu

| Rank | Chief of Police | Deputy Chief | Assistant Chief | Major | Captain | Lieutenant | Sergeant/ Detective | Corporal | Police Officer |
| Insignia | | | | 3 Kukui nuts | 2 Kukui nuts | 1 Kukui nut | | | No insignia |

Houston

| Rank | Chief | Executive Assistant Chief | Assistant Chief | Commander | Lieutenant | Sergeant | Senior Police Officer | Police Officer |
| Insignia | | | | | | | | No insignia |

Indianapolis

| Rank | Chief of Police | Assistant Chief | Deputy Chief | Commander | Major | Captain | Lieutenant | Sergeant | Detective | Patrolman |
| Insignia | | | | | | | | | No insignia | |

Irvine

| Rank | Chief of Police | Assistant Chief | Commander | Lieutenant | Sergeant | Corporal/Field Training Officer | Police Officer |
| Insignia | | | | | | | No insignia |

Jacksonville

| Rank | Sheriff | Undersheriff | Director | Chief | Assistant Chief | Captain (Corrections/Auxiliary Only) | Lieutenant | Master Sergeant | Senior Sergeant | Sergeant | Master Police Officer/Master Corrections Officer /Community Service Corporal/Police Emergency Communications Officer II (Dispatcher) | Senior Police Officer/Senior Corrections Officer /Police Emergency Communications Officer I (Receiving Officer) | Officer / Detective |
| Insignia | | | | | | | | | | | | | No insignia |

Juneau

| Rank | Chief | Deputy Chief | Lieutenant | Sergeant | Detective | Police Officer |
| Insignia | | | | | No insignia | |

Kansas City

| Rank | Chief of police | Deputy chief | Major | Captain | Sergeant | Police officer | Probationary police officer |
| Insignia | | | | | | No insignia | |

Kingsburg

| Rank | Chief | Sergeant | Police Officer |
| Insignia | | | No insignia |

Las Vegas

| Rank | Sheriff | Undersheriff | Assistant Sheriff | Deputy Chief | Captain/Corrections Captain | Lieutenant/Corrections Lieutenant | Sergeant/Corrections Sergeant | Police Officer/Corrections Officer |
| Insignia | | | | | | | | No insignia |

Little Rock

| Rank | Chief | Assistant Chief | Captain | Lieutenant | Sergeant | Police Officer |
| Insignia | | | | | | No insignia |

Lexington, Massachusetts

| Rank | Police Chief | Captain | Lieutenant | Sergeant | Detective | Police Officer |
| Insignia | | | | | No Insignia | No Insignia |
| Description | The Executive Head of the department, responsible for oversight of both the Administration and Operations Divisions. They're also responsible for Internal Affairs management and Fiscal Affairs. | Commanders of the Administration Division or Operations Division, as well as being Second-in-Command of the Department. | Patrol Group Supervisors, Shift Commanders, and Sub-Division Commanders. | Patrol Supervisors, sometimes Shift Commanders. | Investigators, as well as the School Resource Officer. | Standard members of the department, filling various roles. |

Long Beach

| Rank | Chief | Assistant chief | Deputy chief | Commander | Lieutenant | Sergeant | Corporal | Police officer |
| Insignia | | | | | | | | No insignia |

Los Angeles

| Ranks | Chief of Police | Police Assistant Chief | Police Deputy Chief | Police Commander | Police Captain III; Police Captain II; Police Captain I | Police Lieutenant II; Police Lieutenant I | Detective III | Police Sergeant II | Police Detective II | Police Sergeant I | Police Detective I | Police Senior Lead Officer | Police Officer III | Police Officer II | Police Officer I |
| Insignia | | | | | | | | | | | | | | No insignia | |
| Description | Appointment made by the Mayor of Los Angeles, with majority approval of the Police Commission. Should have a college degree and at least 12 years of progressively responsible law enforcement experience. | Commanding Officer of an office or Bureau | Assistant commanding Officer of an office or Bureau | Eligibility for rank promotion achieved after completion of required probationary periods. | | | At least two years service as Sergeant or Detective before eligibility for promotion to Lieutenant I. | | Promotion based on panel interview/departmental assessment. | | | Certain Police Officers III in special or hazard pay situations (Police Officer III+1s) are denoted by a Police Officer III insignia and star. These roles can include traffic follow-up investigators, canine training officers, SWAT platoon element leaders, and Senior Lead Officers who coordinate geographical areas. | At least four years service as a Police Officer before becoming eligible for promotion to Sergeant I or Detective I (which requires an additional examination and interview). | At least three years service as a Police Officer before eligibility for promotion to Police Officer III | Automatic promotion to Police Officer II upon satisfactory completion of an 18-month probationary assignment (6 months at the academy plus a 12-month field assessment). |

Los Angeles School Police Department

| Ranks | Chief of police | Deputy chief of police | Police lieutenant | Police sergeant | Police detective | Senior police officer | Police officer | Police recruit |
| Insignia | | | | | | | No insignia | |

Los Angeles Airport Police

| Ranks | Airport Police Chief | Assistant Airport Police Chief | Airport Police Captain II | Airport Police Captain I | Airport Police Lieutenant | Airport Police Sergeant II | Airport Police Sergeant I | Airport Police Officer III – Detective Assignment | Airport Police Officer III – Senior Lead Officer Assignment | Airport Police Officer II | Airport Police Officer I |
| Insignia | | | | | | | | | | | |

Louisville

| Rank | Chief of Police | Deputy Chief | Assistant Chief | Major | Lieutenant | Sergeant | Detective | Police Officer |
| Insignia | | | | | | | No insignia | |

Madera

| Rank | Chief | Commander | Lieutenant | Sergeant | Police Officer |
| Insignia | | | | | No insignia |

Memphis

| Rank | Chief of Police | Assistant Chief of Police | Deputy Chief | Station Commander | Assistant Station Commander | Major | Lieutenant | Sergeant | Police Officer/Detective |
| Insignia | | | | | | | | | No insignia |

Miami

| Rank | Chief of Police | Deputy Chief | Assistant Chief | Major | Commander | Executive Officer | Senior Sergeant-At-Arms | Sergeant-At-Arms | Captain | Lieutenant | Sergeant | Police Officer |
| Insignia | | | | | | | | | | | | No insignia |

Minneapolis

| Rank | Chief of Police | Assistant chief | Deputy chief | Inspector | Commander and chaplain | Lieutenant | Sergeant (20 years seniority) | Sergeant (16 years seniority) | Sergeant (11 years seniority) | Sergeant (6 years seniority) | Sergeant | Police Officer/ investigator |
| Insignia | | | | | | | | | | | | No insignia |

Modesto

| Rank | Chief | Assistant Chief | Captain | Lieutenant | Sergeant | Detective | Police Officer |
| Insignia | | | | | | No insignia | |

Nashville

| Rank | Chief of Police | Deputy Chief | Commander | Captain | Lieutenant | Sergeant | Field Training Officer | Police Officer/Detective | Police Officer Trainee |
| Insignia | | | | | | | | No insignia | |

New Orleans

| Rank | Superintendent | Chief Deputy Superintendent | Deputy Superintendent | Captain | Lieutenant | Sergeant Major | Sergeant | Detective | Officer IV | Officer III | Officer II | Officer I | Reserve | Recruit (Field) | Recruit (Academy) |
| Insignia | | | | | | | | Same as Officers | | | | No insignia | | | |
| Description | Police Department commander | Bureau commander | Bureau commander | Division, Unit, Section commander | Platoon, Division, District Unit, Section commander | Honorary Rank (Sector, Section, Task Force commander) | Sector, Section, Task Force commander | Investigations, CrimeStoppers | Patrol, Various | | | | (same as regular Officers) | | N/A |

New York City

| Rank | Commissioner (civilian) | First Deputy Commissioner (civilian) | Chief of department | Bureau Chief; Bureau Chief Chaplain†; Department Chief Surgeon | Assistant Chief; Assistant Chief Chaplain†; Assistant Chief Surgeon | Deputy Chief; Deputy Chief Chaplain†; District Surgeon | Inspector; Chaplain†; Police Surgeon | Deputy Inspector | Captain | Lieutenant | Sergeant | Detective (grades 3rd–1st) | Police officer | Probationary police officer | Recruit officer | Cadet |
| Insignia | No insignia | No insignia | | | | | | | | | | No insignia | | | | |

†: Rank that has no police powers

Norfolk

| Rank | Chief | Deputy; Chief | Assistant; Chief | Captain | Lieutenant | PTO Sergeant | Sergeant | PTO Corporal | Corporal | Police Training Officer II | Master Police Officer | Police Training Officer I | Detective | Officer | Recruit |
| Insignia | | | | | | | | | | | No insignia | | No insignia | | |

Oakland

| Rank | Chief | Assistant Chief | Deputy Chief | Captain | Lieutenant | Sergeant (Training Sergeant)/Detective | Field Training Officer | Police Officer/Investigator |
| Insignia | | | | | | | | No insignia |

Oklahoma City

| Rank | Colonel | Lieutenant colonel | Major | Captain | Lieutenant | Master sergeant | Staff sergeant | Sergeant | Detective | Police Officer | Probationary Officer | Recruit Officer | Recruit |
| Insignia | | | | | | | | | No insignia | | | | |

Omaha

| Rank | Chief of Police | Deputy Chief | Captain | Lieutenant | Sergeant | Police Officer; 7 years seniority | Police Officer |
| Insignia | | | | | | | No insignia |

Philadelphia

| Rank | Police Commissioner | First Deputy Police Commissioner | Deputy Police Commissioner | Chief Inspector | Inspector | Captain | Lieutenant | Sergeant | Corporal; Detective | Police Officer | Police Officer Recruit |
| Insignia | | | | | | | | | | No insignia | |

Phoenix

| Rank | Chief of Police | Executive Assistant Chief | Assistant Chief | Commander | Lieutenant | Sergeant | Sergeant-in-Training | Field Training Officer | Police Officer |
| Insignia | | | | | | | | | No insignia |

Pittsburgh

| Rank | Chief | Deputy Chief | Assistant Chief | Commander | Lieutenant | Sergeant | Detective/Police Officer |
| Insignia | | | | | | | No insignia |

Portland

| Rank | Chief of Police | Deputy Chief | Assistant Chief | Commander | Captain | Lieutenant | Sergeant | Detective & Criminalist | Officer | Cadet |
| Insignia | | | | | | | | No insignia | | |

Raleigh

| Rank | Chief of Police | Deputy Chief | Major | Captain | Lieutenant | Sergeant | Detective | Senior Officer | Master Officer | First Class Officer | Police Officer | Recruit |
| Insignia | | | | | | | No insignia | | | | | |

Roseville

| Rank | Chief | Captain | Lieutenant | Sergeant | Police Officer |
| Insignia | | | | | No insignia |

Sacramento

| Rank | Chief | Deputy chief | Captain | Lieutenant | Sergeant | Police officer |
| Insignia | | | | | | No insignia |

San Antonio

| Rank | Chief | Assistant Chief | Deputy Chief | Captain | Lieutenant | Sergeant | Detective-Investigator | Police officer |
| Insignia | | | | | | | | No insignia |

San Diego

| Rank | Chief | Executive Assistant Chief | Assistant Chief | Captain | Lieutenant | Sergeant | Detective | Police Officer III | Police Officer II | Police Officer I | Police Recruit |
| Insignia | | | | | | | No insignia | | | | |

San Francisco

| Rank | Chief | Assistant Chief | Deputy Chief | Commander | Captain | Lieutenant | Sergeant | Inspector | Assistant Inspector | Officer |
| Insignia | | | | | | | | | | |

San Jose

| Rank | Chief | Assistant Chief | Deputy Chief | Captain | Lieutenant | Sergeant | Officer |
| Insignia | | | | | | | No insignia |

Salt Lake City

| Rank | Chief of Police | Assistant Chief | Deputy Chief | Captain | Lieutenant | Sergeant | Detective | Police Officer |
| Insignia | | | | | | | No insignia | |

Seattle

| Rank | Chief of Police | Deputy Chief | Assistant Chief | Captain | Lieutenant | Sergeant | Detective | Police Officer |
| Insignia | | | | | | | No insignia | |

Selma

| Rank | Chief | Lieutenant | Sergeant | Police Officer |
| Insignia | | | | No insignia |

St. Louis

| Rank | Police Commissioner | Deputy Chief | Major | Captain | Lieutenant | Sergeant | Police Officer/Detective | Probationary Police Officer | Police Cadet |
| Insignia | | | | | | | No insignia | | |
| Description | The Police Commissioner holds the rank of Chief and is appointed by Board of Police Commissioners. Highest rank in the Metropolitan Police Department. | Deputy chiefs are appointed by the Police Commissioner and hold the rank of lieutenant colonel, the second highest rank in the Metropolitan Police Department. | Majors are appointed by the Police Commissioner. | Captains are appointed by the Police Commissioner. | Assigned to geographic patrol and detective divisions is responsible for supervising patrol sergeants, police officers and detectives who carry out day-to-day, routine crime suppression and investigative functions | Sergeants are responsible for the direct supervision of their patrol division and the conduct, appearance and performance of personnel assigned under their command. | Performs duties to patrol a specific area to protect life and property, and enforce laws and ordinances using tactful and courteous treatment of the public and conscientious and efficient performance of duties. | Following graduation from the academy, officers receive the title Probationary Police Officer (PPO) for twelve months until being promoted to Police Officer. | The goal of the program is to provide interested individuals between the ages of 18 and 20½ with paid, on the job training and exposure to various police department units; the opportunity to earn course credit; and the foundation to be successful and well-prepared upon entering the St. Louis Police Academy once turning 20½. |

Tampa

| Rank | Chief of Police | Assistant Chief of Police | Deputy Chief | Major | Captain | Lieutenant | Sergeant | Corporal | Master Police Officer | Police Officer |
| Insignia | | | | | | | | | | No insignia |

Tucson

| Rank | Chief of Police | Deputy Chief | Assistant Chief | Captain | Lieutenant | Sergeant | Lead Police Officer | Detective | Police Officer | Police Reserve Officer | Police Recruit | Police Volunteer |
| Insignia | | | | | | | | No insignia | | | | |

Virginia Beach

Washington, DC

| Rank | Chief of Police | Patrol Chief | Assistant chief | Commander | Inspector | Captain | Lieutenant | Sergeant | Master Patrol Officer | Officer First Class | Officer | Recruit officer |
| Insignia | | | | | | | | | | | No insignia | |

=== Other ===
Other

Amtrak

| Rank | Chief of Police | Assistant Chief of Police | Deputy Chief | Inspector | Captain | Lieutenant | Sergeant | Detective (Gold Badge/insignias) | Special Agent (Gold Badge/insignias) | Criminal Investigator | Police Officer |
| Insignia | | | | | | | | No insignia | | | |

Puerto Rico

| Rank | Comisario; Commissioner | Coronel; Colonel | Teniente Coronel; Lieutenant colonel | Comandante; Commander | Inspector; Inspector | Capitán; Captain | Teniente Primero; First lieutenant | Teniente Segundo; Second lieutenant | Sargento; Sergeant | Agente; Officer/ Agent | Cadete; Cadet |
| Insignia | | | | | | | | | | | No insignia |
| Description | Governor Appointee | Bureau/ Regional/ Administrative Commander | Regional/ Administrative Commander | Regional Commander | Division/ Unit/ District Commander | District/ Precinct/ Unit Commander/Supervisor | District/ Precinct/ Unit Commander | District/ Precinct Commander | Shift Supervisor | Patrol | |

== See also ==
- Police uniforms in the United States
