= Georgia State Patrol =

State patrol agency for Georgia, United States

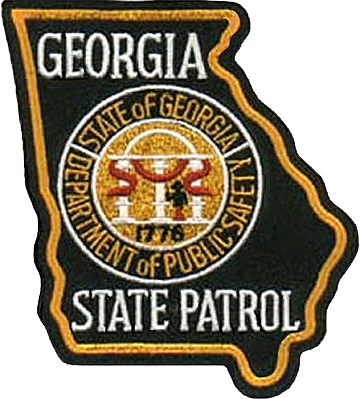
- Patch of Georgia State Patrol

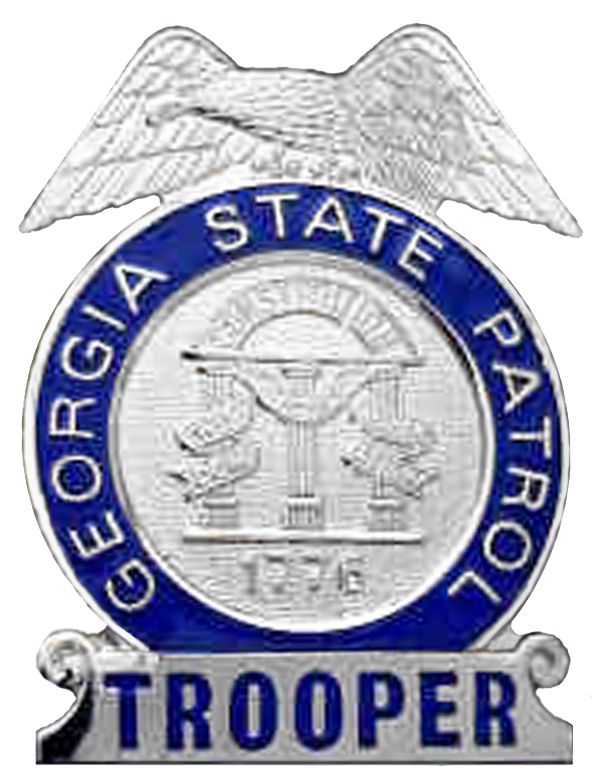
- Badge of Georgia State Patrol
- Abbreviation: GSP
- Motto: Wisdom, Justice and Moderation

Agency overview
- Formed: 1937; 89 years ago
- Employees: 1,440 (as of 2024)

Jurisdictional structure
- Operations jurisdiction: Georgia, USA
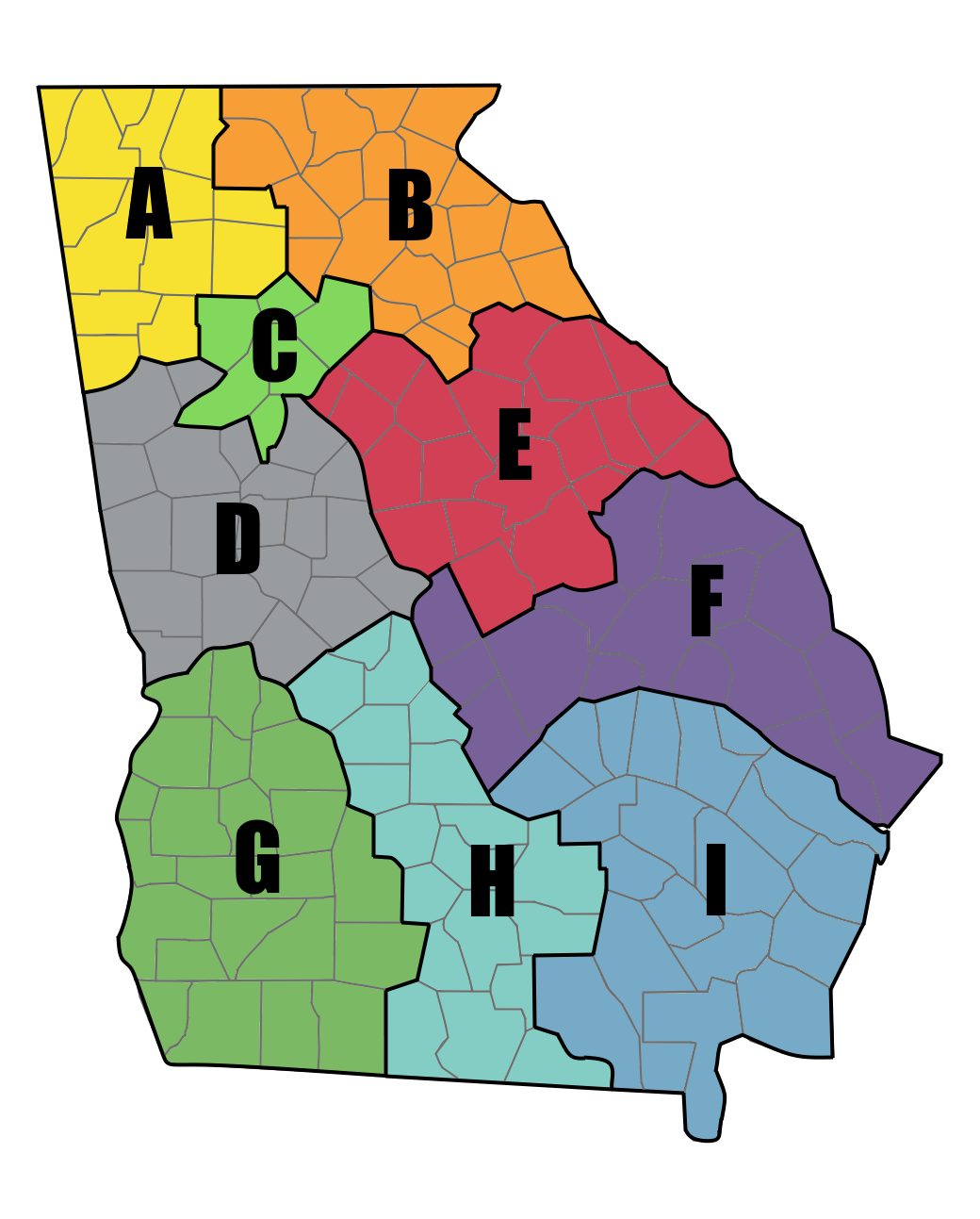
- Georgia State Patrol Troop Map
- Area: 59,425 square miles (153,910 km^{2})
- Population: 11.1 million (2025 est.)
- Legal jurisdiction: Statewide
- General nature: Civilian police

Operational structure
- Headquarters: Atlanta, Georgia
- Troopers: 859 (as of December 2024)
- Civilian employees: 581 (as of December 2024)
- Agency executives: Colonel William W. Hitchens, III, Commissioner; Lieutenant Colonel Kendrick Lowe, Deputy Commissioner
- Parent agency: Georgia Department of Public Safety
- Patrol Troops: 9

Facilities
- Posts: 52

Website
- Georgia State Patrol

Georgia State Patrol (GSP) is a division of the Georgia Department of Public Safety. It is the primary state patrol agency for the U.S. state of Georgia, established in March 1937. Although focused primarily on the enforcement of traffic laws and investigation of traffic crashes, the GSP supports the efforts of all public safety agencies to reduce criminal activity, apprehend those involved, and respond to natural and manmade disasters.

== History ==
Founded on March 19, 1937, the Georgia State Patrol was founded alongside the Georgia Department of Public Safety by the Georgia State Legislative Branch, then signed by then-Governor E.D. Rivers. Georgia State Patrol was founded in response to the immediate need of a Law Enforcement entity to enforce the laws of the roadway, investigate traffic accidents, general investigations and to handle driver licensing.

The first Trooper class started in the Summer of 1937, held at Georgia Tech. Those Troopers graduated in August 1937 and were on patrol by September. In a release celebrating the 70th Anniversary of the State Patrol, the Georgia Department of public safety stated "The first Georgia State Patrol posts were located in Griffin, Cartersville, Gainesville, Madison, Americus, Moultrie, Perry, Washington, Swainsboro, and Waycross.".

On July 13, 1970, The Georgia State Patrol hired their first African-American Trooper onto the force. Major Robert Hightower would end up serving the Georgia State Patrol for 28 years, retiring in 1998 as a Major. Major Hightower would go on to pave paths for the future of African-American Troopers in the Georgia State Patrol.

In 1978, the 52nd Trooper Class graduated from Trooper School, welcoming the first four female troopers onto the force.

1996 marked the year in which Atlanta, Georgia, would hold the Summer Olympics. Georgia State Patrol would have heavy involvement in the games acting as Muhammad Ali's personal security. Additionally, Georgia State Patrol would act as security for the games and providing a special torch escort car, a Georgia State Patrol 1996 BMW 328i. Troopers from GSP Accompanied the torch along it entire route throughout the United States, until finally settling down in Atlanta.

== Rank structure ==
Title	Insignia
Commissioner (Colonel)	
Deputy Commissioner (Lieutenant Colonel)	
Major (Adjutant)	
Captain (Troop commander)	
Lieutenant (Assistant Troop Commander)	
Master Sergeant (Post Commander)
Sergeant First Class (Post Commander)	
Sergeant (Assistant Post Commander)	
Corporal (Assistant Post Commander)	.
Master Trooper	No insignia
Senior Trooper	No insignia
Trooper First Class 3	No insignia
Trooper First Class 2	No insignia
Trooper First Class 1	No insignia
Trooper	No insignia

== Troops and posts ==
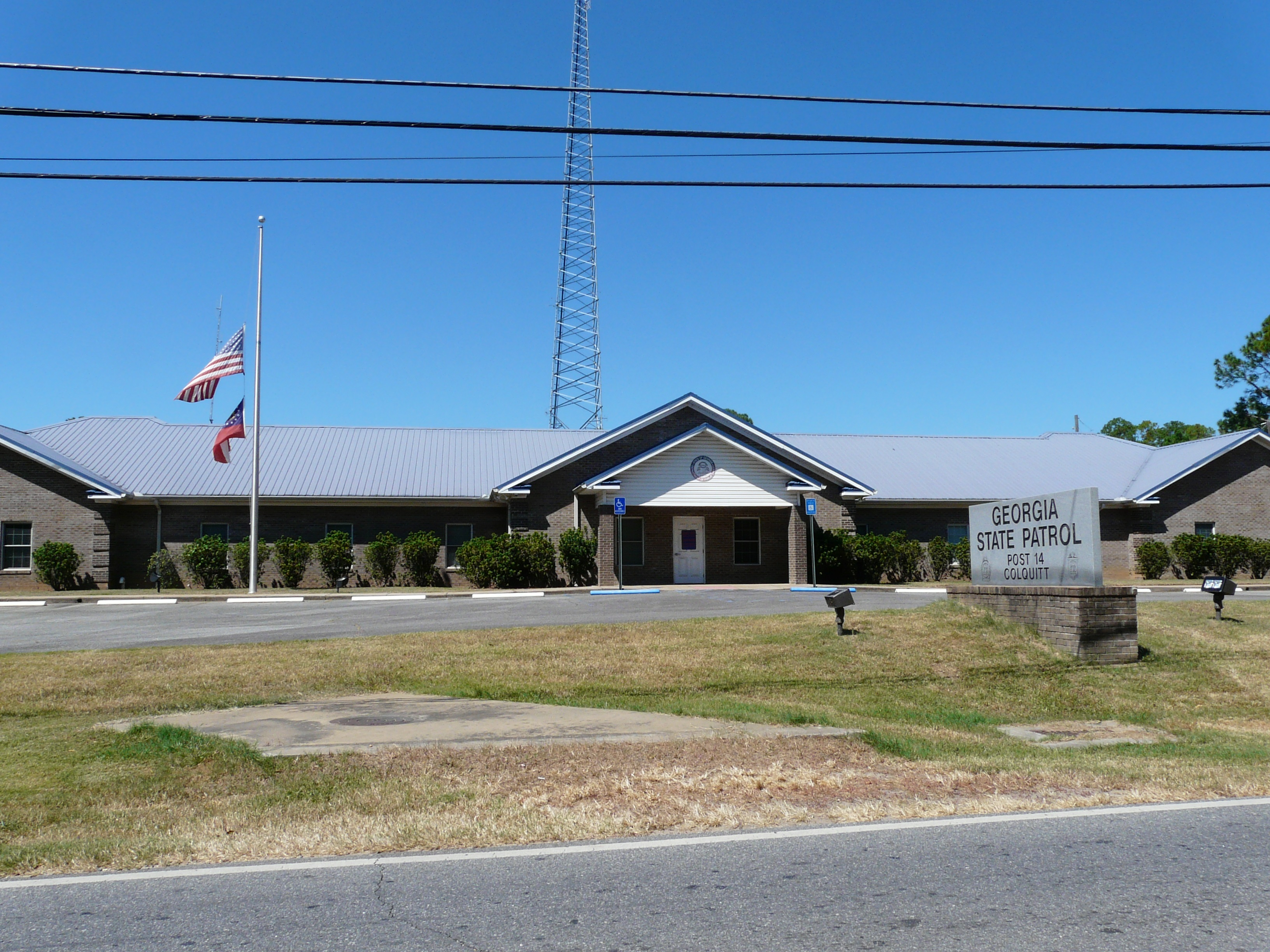
Post 14 in Colquitt, Georgia

- Troops (A-I) and Posts (1-52)
  - Troop A
    - Includes the following counties: Bartow, Catoosa, Chattooga, Cherokee, Dade, Floyd, Gordon, Haralson, Murray, Paulding, Pickens, Polk, Walker, Whitfield
    - Post 3 – Cartersville, Post 5 – Dalton, Post 28 – Jasper, Post 29 – Paulding, Post 38 – Rome, Post 41 – LaFayette, Post 43 – Calhoun.
  - Troop B
    - Includes the following counties: Banks, Barrow, Clarke, Dawson, Elbert, Fannin, Forsyth, Franklin, Gilmer, Habersham, Hall, Hart, Jackson, Lumpkin, Madison, Oconee, Rabun, Stephens, Towns, Union, White
    - Post 6 – Gainesville, Post 7 – Toccoa, Post 27 – Blue Ridge, Post 32 – Athens, Post 37 – Cumming, Post 52 – Hartwell
  - Troop C
    - Includes the following counties: Clayton, Cobb, DeKalb, Fulton and Gwinnett
    - Post 47 - Forest Park, Post 48 - Atlanta, Post 49 - Atlanta (Motor Unit), Post 51 - Gwinnett, Post 83 - Buckhead, Nighthawks North Task Force - Atlanta
  - Troop D
    - Includes the following counties: Bibb, Butts, Carroll, Coweta, Crawford, Douglas, Fayette, Harris, Heard, Henry, Lamar, Meriwether, Monroe, Muscogee, Pike, Spalding, Talbot, Taylor, Troup, Upson
    - Post 1 – Griffin, Post 2 – LaGrange, Post 4 – Villa Rica, Post 24 – Newnan, Post 26 – Thomaston, Post 34 – Manchester, Nighthawks Middle Task Force - Newnan
  - Troop E
    - Includes the following counties: Baldwin, Columbia, Glascock, Greene, Hancock, Jasper, Jones, Lincoln, McDuffie, Morgan, Newton, Oglethorpe, Putnam, Richmond, Rockdale, Taliaferro, Walton, Warren, Washington, Wilkes, Wilkinson
    - Post 8 – Madison, Post 17 – Washington, Post 25 – Grovetown, Post 33 – Milledgeville, Post 46 – Monroe
  - Troop F
    - Includes the following counties: Bleckley, Bryan, Bulloch, Burke, Candler, Chatham, Dodge, Effingham, Emanuel, Jefferson, Jenkins, Johnson, Laurens, Screven, Treutlen, Twiggs
    - Post 19 – Swainsboro, Post 20 – Dublin, Post 21 – Sylvania, Post 42 – Rincon, Post 45 – Statesboro, Nighthawks South DUI Task Force – Rincon
  - Troop G
    - Includes the following counties: Baker, Calhoun, Chattahoochee, Clay, Colquitt, Decatur, Dougherty, Early, Grady, Lee, Marion, Miller, Mitchell, Quitman, Randolph, Schley, Seminole, Stewart, Sumter, Terrell, Thomas, Webster, Worth
    - Post 10 – Americus, Post 12 – Thomasville, Post 14 – Colquitt, Post 39 – Cuthbert, Post 40 – Worth
  - Troop H
    - Includes the following counties: Atkinson, Ben Hill, Berrien, Brooks, Coffee, Cook, Crisp, Dooly, Echols, Houston, Irwin, Lanier, Lowndes, Macon, Peach, Pulaski, Tift, Turner, Wilcox
    - Post 13 – Tifton, Post 15 – Perry, Post 30 – Cordele, Post 31 – Valdosta, Post 36 – Douglas
  - Troop I
    - Includes the following counties: Appling, Bacon, Brantley, Camden, Charlton, Clinch, Evans, Glynn, Jeff Davis, Liberty, Long, McIntosh, Montgomery, Pierce, Tattnall, Telfair, Toombs, Ware, Wayne, Wheeler
    - Post 11 – Hinesville, Post 16 – Hazlehurst, Post 18 – Reidsville, Post 22 – Waycross, Post 35 – Jekyll Island
- Specialty Troop (J)
  - Troop J (Safety Education and Implied Consent) – Troop J contains two units:
    - Safety Education Unit – Promotes the safe operation of motor vehicles.
    - Implied Consent Unit – Provides support to the Forensics Science Division of the Georgia Bureau of Investigation (GBI) by overseeing and maintaining the breath-alcohol program for the State of Georgia.
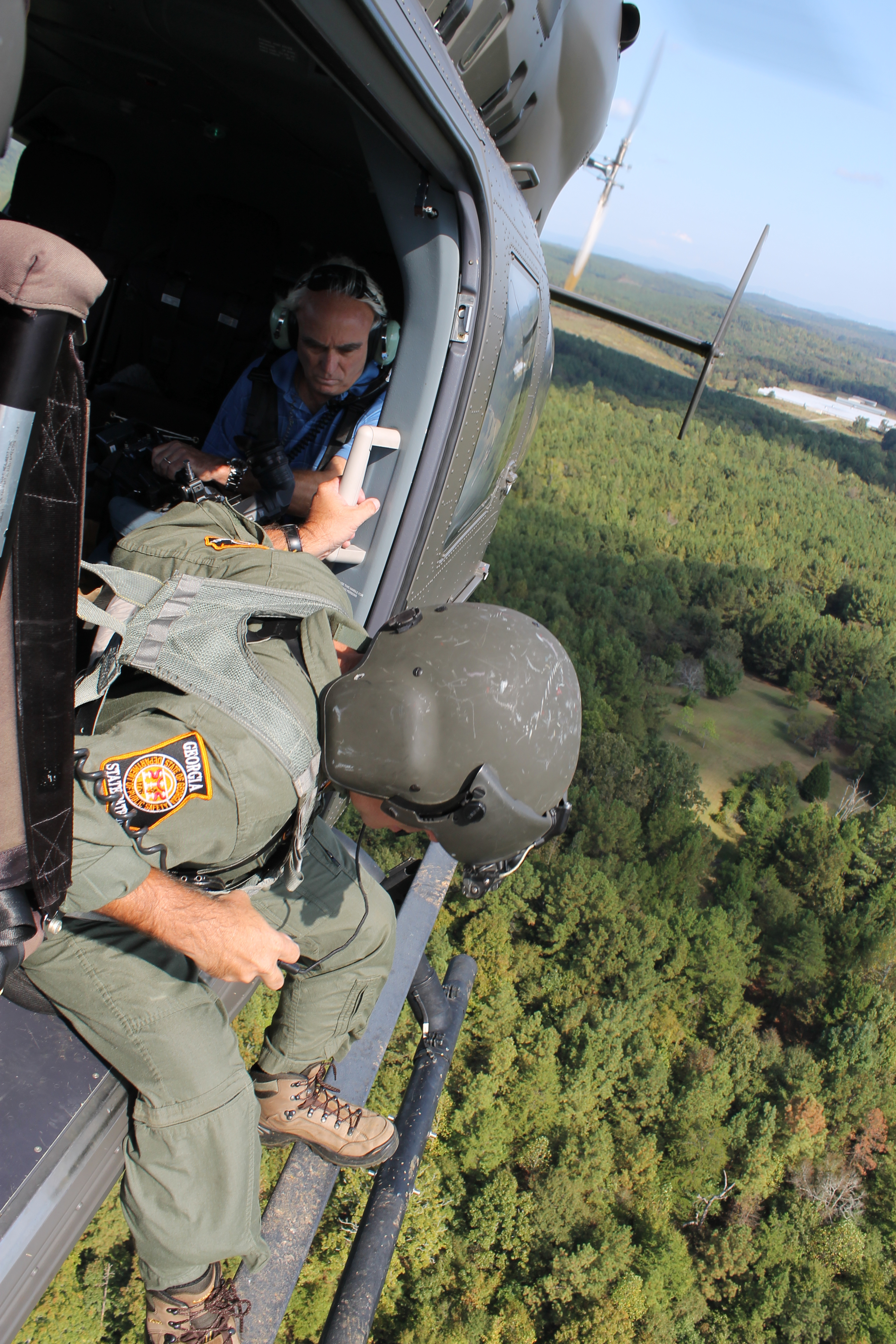
      Governor's Task Force in flight
- Special Weapons and Tactics (SWAT) includes the Crisis Negotiations Team (CNT)
- Dive Team
- Specialized Collision Reconstruction Team (SCRT)
- Criminal Interdiction Unit (CIU)
- Crime Suppression Unit (CSU)
- Aviation Unit – Operates 15 helicopters and a Cessna 182 from six locations throughout the State. These are located in Kennesaw, Albany, Gainesville, Perry, Reidsville, and Augusta
- Governor's Task Force – airborne marijuana eradication unit partnered with the Army National Guard.
- Nighthawks DUI Task Force – 3 DUI Task Forces (Nighthawks North, Nighthawks Middle, Nighthawks South) that patrol during peak DUI related hours in metro areas.
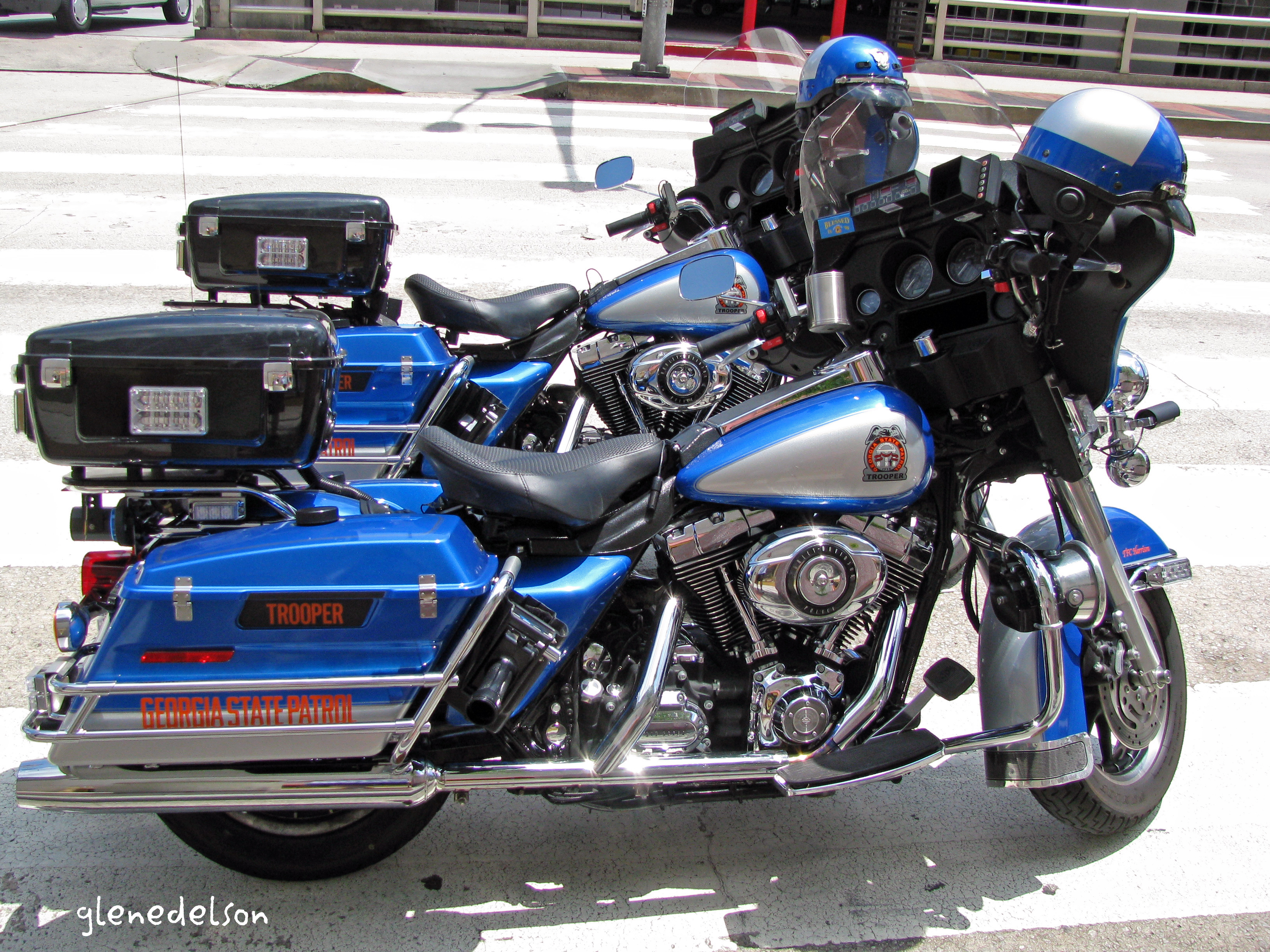
  Georgia State Patrol Motorcycles
- Motorcycle Unit – Post 49 – Patrols the Interstate Highways of metropolitan Atlanta with 30 motorcycles.
- Executive Security – The Executive Security Division is, by law, responsible for two distinct functions: executive security and executive protection. The Executive Security Unit provides facility security for the Governor's Mansion and provides personal security for the residents. The Executive Protection Unit provides continual security for the governor, lieutenant governor, the speaker of the House, and the chief justice of the Georgia Supreme Court, and their families.
- Honor Guard
- Recruiting Unit
- Training Division

== Other divisions of the Georgia DPS ==
=== Capitol Police ===
Officers with the Capitol Police Division investigate criminal incidents and traffic crashes; manage street closures for events; patrol the streets on Capitol Square and those adjacent to other state buildings; provide courtroom security for Georgia's Supreme Court and Court of Appeals; conduct security assessments and surveillance detection; and deliver personal safety training for state employees and others.

=== Commercial Vehicle Enforcement ===
The Commercial Vehicle Enforcement Division (CVE), formerly Motor Carrier Compliance Division (as of July 1, 2025), performs driver and vehicle inspections of commercial motor vehicles at roadsides, inspection stations, and at carriers' terminals. The inspections range from "full" vehicle and driver inspections—which include mechanical components—to "driver only" inspections. These may also include inspections of vehicles transporting hazardous materials.

This division consists of the following units and programs:

- HOV Unit – responsible for the enforcement of High Occupancy Lane restrictions and communications.
- School Bus Safety Unit – responsible for the annual safety inspection of the state's 17,000 public school buses
- Compliance Review Program/Safety Audit – consists of 20 officers who conduct interstate and intrastate compliance reviews.
- Size and Weight Enforcement – the operation of 19 permanent weight/inspection stations provide enforcement coverage on the interstates and related by-pass routes.
- Commercial Motor Vehicle Safety Program – contains five federally funded and required program areas, Driver/Vehicle Inspections, Traffic Enforcement, Compliance Reviews, Public Information and Education and Data Collection.

== Equipment ==
=== Current equipment ===
Name	Type	Caliber	Origin	Notes
Glock 45 Gen5 MOS	Pistol	9mm	Austria	Equipped with a Trijicon SRO, factory Glock +2 magazine extension, and a Nightstick TCM-550XL weapons light.
Glock 43	Pistol	9mm	Austria	Backup weapon.
Remington 870	Shotgun	12 Gauge	United States	Standard Issue
LWRC Patrol Rifle	Patrol Rifle	.223-5.56mm	United States	Patrol rifle equipped with an Aimpoint.

=== Previously issued equipment ===
- Glock 45 Gen5 9mm (2020–2023)
- Glock 17 Gen4 9mm (2015–2019)
- Glock 37 .45 GAP (2007–2015)
- Glock 22 .40 S&W (1990s–2007)
- Smith & Wesson Model 5906 9mm or Smith & Wesson Model 4506 .45 ACP—troopers choice (early 1990s to late 1990s)
- Smith & Wesson Model 66 .357 Magnum
- Colt Python .357 Magnum
- Smith & Wesson Model 28 .357 Magnum

== Vehicles ==
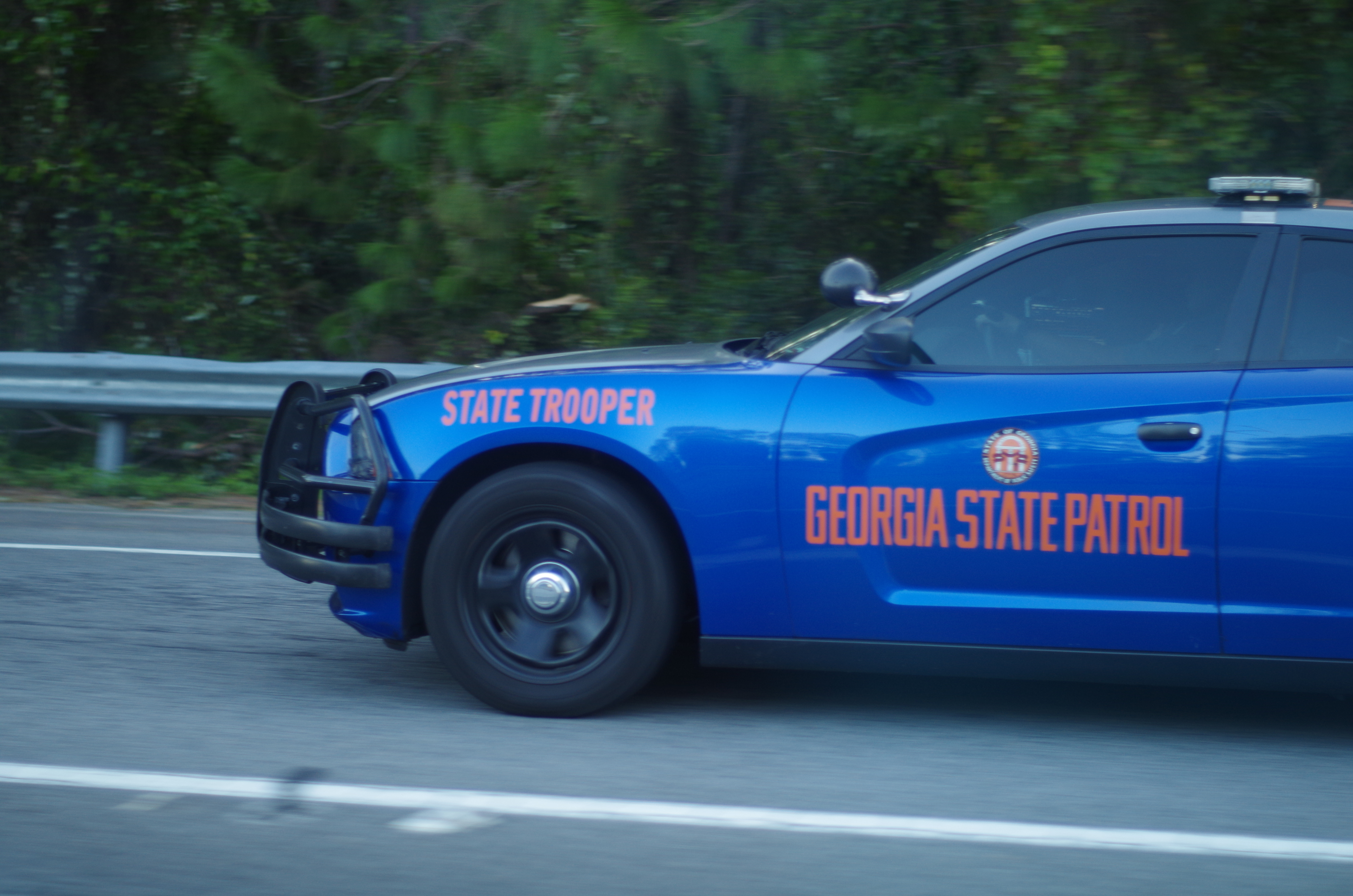
Georgia State Patrol Dodge Charger

The GSP currently uses Dodge Chargers as the main patrol vehicle which are in the blue and gray scheme, and are currently issuing out Dodge Durangos, Dodge Challengers, Chevrolet Camaros, Chevrolet Silverados, Ford Explorers, and Ford Mustangs. Many of these vehicles are now ordered black in color. They are painted in the traditional blue and grey at the factory with orange decals. However, some are issued in the color black displaying gray decals or black with ghost letters. In addition, they also utilize the Chevrolet Tahoe, which includes vehicles in either black, white, or grey color schemes. When these cars are retired, the decals and emergency equipment are removed from the vehicles before being auctioned off to the public, yet retain the old blue and grey scheme (or as shown on this old 1992 Ford Mustang) the decals can be spray painted over. Former models used were the Chevrolet Caprice, Ford LTD Crown Victoria, Pontiac LeMans, BMW 328i (one still kept by the state), Ford Mustang and Ford Thunderbird.

== Fallen officers ==
Since the establishment of the Georgia State Patrol, 29 officers and 1 K9 have died in the line of duty.

== Controversies ==
- In January 2026, an investigation started which resulted in the firing of 4 troopers in a "PIT for Pay" technique. This technique was used by utilizing a tactic known as a precision immobilization technique (PIT) maneuver, then demanding insurance for an approximate $25,000 payout for medical or emotional damages. The Georgia State Patrol fired these 4 Troopers tied to this citing policy violations.

== See also ==
- List of law enforcement agencies in Georgia
- State police
- State patrol
- Highway patrol
