= Trooper (police rank) =

American civilian law enforcement rank

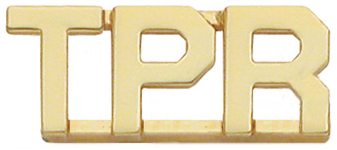

Trooper is a rank used by several civilian state law enforcement organizations in the United States. In its plural form, state troopers, it generally refers to sworn members of a state law enforcement agency, state police, state highway patrol, or state department of public safety, even though those officers may not necessarily be of the rank of trooper.

== Australia ==
Early Australian police forces had officers termed troopers, typically mounted police. For example, the classic Australian folk song "Waltzing Matilda" contains the line "Down came the troopers, they come once more one two three one, two, three," referring to three mounted police who had come to arrest the swagman. The term is no longer in current usage in Australia.

== United States ==
In the Louisiana State Police, trooper is a rank below trooper first class, and above cadet. The insignia for this rank consists of a gold colored TPR collar pin worn on the wearer's right lapel. Cadets who complete the state police academy are automatically promoted to trooper. The title of address is "trooper".

Usage in other agencies or countries may vary. In the United States, state agencies are referred to state police or highway patrol. The rank of trooper is used by the following state agencies within the United States:

- Alabama Highway Patrol
- Alaska State Troopers
- Arizona Highway Patrol
- Arkansas State Police
- California Highway Patrol
- Colorado State Patrol
- Connecticut State Police
- Delaware State Police
- Florida Highway Patrol
- Georgia State Patrol
- Idaho State Police
- Illinois State Police
- Indiana State Police
- Iowa State Patrol
- Kansas Highway Patrol
- Kentucky State Police
- Louisiana State Police
- Maine State Police
- Massachusetts State Police
- Maryland State Police
- Michigan State Police
- Minnesota State Patrol
- Mississippi Highway Patrol
- Missouri State Highway Patrol
- Nevada Highway Patrol
- New Jersey State Police
- New York State Police
- North Carolina State Highway Patrol
- North Dakota Highway Patrol
- Ohio State Highway Patrol
- Oklahoma Highway Patrol
- Oregon State Police
- Pennsylvania State Police
- Rhode Island State Police
- South Carolina Highway Patrol
- South Dakota Highway Patrol
- Texas Highway Patrol
- Tennessee Highway Patrol
- Utah Highway Patrol
- Vermont State Police
- Virginia State Police
- Washington State Patrol
- West Virginia State Police
- Wyoming Highway Patrol

=== Wildlife trooper ===
Wildlife trooper Is a rank commonly used in the western United States associated with the duties of a game warden. Currently this title is used in the states of Oregon and Alaska.

== See also ==
- New Mexico Mounted Patrol trooper
- Police ranks of the United States
- Trooper first class
