= Georgia Department of Public Safety =

State law enforcement agency in U.S.

- Georgia Department of Public Safety seal
- Abbreviation: GDPS

Agency overview
- Formed: 1937
- Employees: 1,440 (2024)

Jurisdictional structure
- Operations jurisdiction: Georgia, U.S.
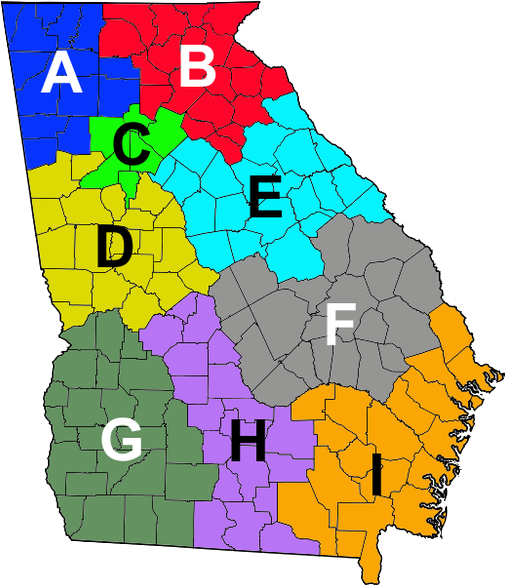
- Georgia State Patrol Troop Map
- Area: 59,425 square miles (153,910 km^{2})
- Population: 10,711,000 (2024 est.)

Operational structure
- Headquarters: Atlanta, Georgia
- Troopers: 859 (2024)
- Civilians: 581 (2024)
- Agency executive: Colonel William W. Hitchens, III, Commissioner
- Child agencies: Georgia State Patrol; Georgia Bureau of Investigation (Historical); Georgia Capitol Police; Commercial Vehicle Enforcement Division

Website
- dps.georgia.gov

The Georgia Department of Public Safety (GDPS) is a state body responsible for statewide law enforcement and public safety within the U.S. state of Georgia. The Commissioner of the department is Colonel William W. Hitchens, III, who also commands the Georgia State Patrol.

== Divisions ==
On February 28, 1974, the Georgia Bureau of Investigation (GBI) was made an independent agency separate from the Georgia Department of Public Safety.

The Department of Public Safety cooperates with U.S. Immigration and Customs Enforcement (ICE), dedicating personnel to joint public safety training programs.

=== Georgia State Patrol ===
The Georgia State Patrol is the highway patrol agency for the U.S. state of Georgia, with jurisdiction spanning the entire state. GSP Troopers primarily operate on the interstate highways and provide specialized support, including SWAT team responses, to local and rural jurisdictions.

A lieutenant colonel serves as commanding officer over field operations; the current Lieutenant Colonel is Kendrick Lowe.

=== Georgia Capitol Police ===
The Georgia Capitol Police Division (CPD) is a specialized division of the Georgia Department of Public Safety tasked with protecting life and property, maintaining public order, and investigating criminal acts throughout the Capitol Hill area of Atlanta, Georgia. The division is directed by a Major, with Major Gary D. Langford serving as the current adjutant and division director.

==== Operations and Mandate ====
Capitol Police officers possess full statewide arrest powers and perform a wide range of law enforcement functions within their sector. Their routine duties include regular vehicle and foot patrols of Capitol Square and streets adjacent to state-owned property, investigating motor vehicle traffic crashes, enforcing traffic laws, and managing street closures for special events. The division is also responsible for managing "Capitol Hill Alerts," an emergency mass notification system utilized by state contractors and government employees working in the downtown complex.

==== Division Structure ====
Operational duties are split across specialized units to secure the downtown campus:

- Capitol Police Services Unit: Composed of sworn, Georgia Peace Officer Standards and Training Council law enforcement officers who handle active criminal investigations, traffic enforcement, responding to emergency calls, and physical building security within the precinct. This unit also provides specialized courtroom security for the Supreme Court of Georgia and the Georgia Court of Appeals.
- Capitol Square Security Unit: Staffed by non-sworn Safety Officers and Georgia State Patrol Cadet Troopers. This unit manages access control points, monitors building entrances, and checks identification, while actively screening incoming state mail, commercial deliveries, and public packages.

==== Agency Collaboration ====
Because of the high concentration of government personnel and local traffic, the division regularly operates alongside other state and municipal agencies. The division coordinates closely with the Georgia State Patrol's Post 50 (Capitol Hill Post) to provide unified protection details for elected state officials, visiting dignitaries, and state employees. For broader emergencies, vehicular accidents, or large-scale civil demonstrations within the city center, the division maintains mutual aid and data-sharing agreements with the Atlanta Police Department and local emergency medical services.

=== Commercial Vehicle Enforcement Division ===
The Commercial Vehicle Enforcement Division (CVE)—formerly known as the Motor Carrier Compliance Division (MCCD) prior to statutory restructuring—is responsible for the enforcement of the laws and rules of the Federal Motor Carrier Safety Administration.

The division conducts safety inspections of commercial motor vehicles (specifically buses and commercial trucks), inspects highway shipments of hazardous materials, and performs safety performance compliance audits on motor carriers. It enforces regulations governing vehicle height, width, length, and weight parameters across 19 stationary weigh stations and via roadside inspections. Additionally, CVE officers enforce High Occupancy Vehicle (HOV) lane regulations through the metropolitan Atlanta corridor.

== See also ==
- List of law enforcement agencies in Georgia
- Georgia Bureau of Investigation
- State police
- State patrol
- Highway patrol
