= Senior trooper =

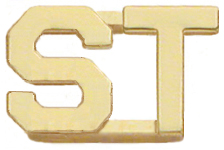
Rank insignia in Louisiana

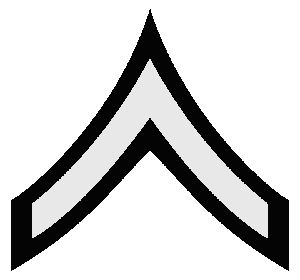
Rank insignia in South Carolina

Senior trooper is a rank used by several state police agencies within the United States and in some world militaries.

It is the third class in the progressive series of state trooper ranks. It is a step below master trooper, yet above trooper first class. For some agencies, the insignia for this position consists of a gold colored 'ST' collar pin worn on the wearer's right lapel while others bear a 'senior trooper' plate that is located below their nametag. The title of address is trooper or senior trooper.

== Responsibilities ==
Senior troopers take on the responsibility to use preventive measures in dealing with accidents and crime, enforce the law, conduct highway patrol, investigate, and perform related administrative duties in order to protect citizens, visitors, public highways, and property of the State or Commonwealth. Senior troopers also provide mentoring, guidance, and training to newly assigned troopers. They have jurisdiction in all parts of the State or Commonwealth they serve and carry a weapon.

== Requirements ==
Senior troopers are required to be knowledgeable on criminal and traffic laws, skilled in the use of firearms and operation of an issued vehicle.

== Career progression ==
Troopers who complete ten years of satisfactory or exceptional service are promoted to the rank of senior trooper. However, it is possible for a trooper to become a senior trooper without ten years of experience. Consideration for movement to senior trooper, master trooper, and senior special agent is based on years of experience, performance evaluation (determines eligibility and used in the event of a tie), discipline, weight control, and educational achievement (used only in the event of a tie). In some agencies, becoming a senior trooper is not a rise in rank but does include a pay raise. In the Texas Highway Patrol, senior troopers are instead positions only attained with 20 years of service, differing from other organizations where the position is given with 10 or less years of service.

== Other ==
Usage in other agencies or countries may vary. In the United States, state agencies are referred to state police or highway patrol. The rank of Senior Trooper is used by the following state agencies within the United States:

- Alabama Highway Patrol
- Florida Highway Patrol
- Indiana State Police
- Iowa State Patrol
- Kentucky State Police
- Louisiana State Police
- Maryland State Police
- North Carolina State Highway Patrol
- Virginia State Police
- West Virginia State Police

== See also ==
- Master trooper
- Trooper first class
- Police ranks of the United States
