= Mississippi Highway Patrol =

State police agency for the US state of Mississippi

- Patch

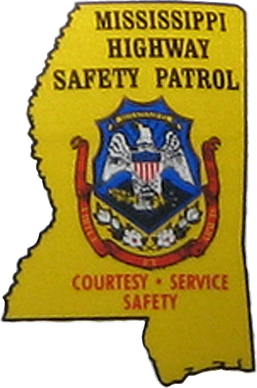
- Door decal
- Common name: Mississippi Highway Patrol
- Abbreviation: MHP
- Motto: Courtesy, Service, Safety

Agency overview
- Formed: 1938; 88 years ago
- Employees: 1,030 (as of 2004)

Jurisdictional structure
- Operations jurisdiction: Mississippi, US
- Mississippi Highway Patrol District map
- Area: 48,434 square miles (125,440 km^{2})
- Population: 2,918,785 (2007 est.)
- General nature: Civilian police

Operational structure
- Headquarters: Jackson, Mississippi
- Sworn members: 650 (authorized, as of 2022)
- Civilians: 495 (as of 2004) (Department of Public Safety employees)
- Agency executive: Colonel Tadd Pitts, Director
- Parent agency: Mississippi Department of Public Safety

Facilities
- Stations: District
- Airbases: 9

Website
- Mississippi Highway Patrol website

The Mississippi Highway Patrol is the highway patrol and acting state police agency for the U.S. state of Mississippi, and has law enforcement jurisdiction over the majority of the state.

The Mississippi Highway Patrol specializes in the patrol of state and federal highways throughout the state of Mississippi, and was formed in 1938 to enforce traffic laws on state and federal highways. It falls under the Mississippi Department of Public Safety. Sworn officers of the Highway Patrol are known as "State Troopers" and have the power to arrest for any crime committed in their presence statewide.

== History ==
The Mississippi Highway Safety Patrol was created in 1938, with its troopers first patrolling the highways on motorcycles. Automobiles were the principal enforcement vehicle in the 1940s and since. The original uniform worn by the Mississippi troopers was a gray shirt with navy blue epaulettes trimmed with gold. The shirt had an MHP patch only on the left shoulder, which was unlike the patch worn today. It was oval to almost round in shape with "Highway Safety Patrol" in gold around the upper perimeter. The center had the state seal and "Virtute et Armis", the state motto, in gold within a red scroll was around the lower perimeter. The trousers were light blue with a darker blue stripe down the leg bordered by gold piping. The shoulder patch was changed in 1956 to a different patch and was worn on both shoulders. The new patch was a curved side triangle displayed point down with "Mississippi" across the top, "Highway Patrol" immediately below it and "Virtute et Armis" along the two sides at the point.

The uniform was changed in the 1960s. Red piping replaced gold for the shirt epaulettes as well as bordering the dark blue stripe on the pants leg for all Troopers below the rank of Major. This led to the nickname "Red Leg" given to Mississippi Troopers, signifying that they are not upper echelon administrative employees, but rather "Road Men," troopers who worked enforcement on the highways.

During the 1966 Meredith Mississippi March for Freedom, which registered over 3000 African Americans to vote in Mississippi, the Mississippi Highway Patrol escorted thousands of civil rights activists from Memphis TN to Jackson MS. Leaders of major civil rights organizations, Martin Luther King Jr. of the Southern Christian Leadership Conference, Floyd McKissick of the Congress of Racial Equality and Stokely Carmichael of the Student Nonviolent Coordinating Committee attended the protest. Guarded by the Mississippi Highway Patrol, the marchers were not attacked on their main route. The March concluded on June 26 with a rally of 15,000 people in Jackson, while over a thousand officers in the Mississippi Highway Patrol, National Guard, and local law enforcement agencies guarded the capitol building.

In 2000 the Mississippi Highway Patrol appointed L.M. Claiborne to become the first African American Colonel of the Mississippi Highway Patrol. Colonel Claiborne began his career with the Mississippi Highway Safety Patrol in December 1980, as a Trooper assigned to Troop H, Louisville, Mississippi. He was promoted to the rank of Trooper First Class in December 1985 and in December 1987 to the rank of Staff Sergeant assigned as the Accident Reconstructionist in Troops H and G. In March 1989, Colonel Claiborne was among the first Highway Patrol Officers to attend training for and become a Crime Scene Investigator with the rank of Sergeant First Class. Claiborne was then promoted to Captain over the training division where he served until his promotion to Colonel.

=== Jackson State killings ===
On May 15, 1970, officers with the Mississippi Highway Safety Patrol and the Jackson Police Department opened fire with more than 150 rounds of "shotgun, carbine, rifle, and submachine gun fire", including armor-piercing bullets, on a women's dormitory at Jackson State College, killing Phillip Gibbs, a prelaw major, and James Green, a local high school student, and injuring 12 others. A federal commission found the response "unreasonable, unjustified" and "clearly unwarranted", and that the MHSP officers provided clearly misleading statements about the targets of their shooting. Highway patrol officers began to collect empty shell casings immediately after the shooting, discarded some, and did not publicly reveal the existence of others until required to surrender them under federal grand jury order. During the period of "levity" and "casual small talk" after the shooting, an MHSP Inspector joked that the two dead students were "10-7", radio code for "Out of Service", during a taped radio conversation that repeatedly used a racial slur to refer to the African-American victims. The highway patrol conducted an investigation led by senior MHSP officers who did not examine photos or physical evidence, cross-examine the patrol officers, maintain interview transcripts or take written statements, file a written report, or interview outside witnesses.

=== The Pistol Team ===
The Mississippi Highway Patrol is home to a world class pistol team. Formerly led by Captain Philip Hemphill (Retired), the pistol team has won numerous competitions in the United States. From 1962 to 2006, the Mississippi Highway Patrol has won the team competition at the National Police Shooting Championships 10 times, more than any other department in the nation. The Los Angeles Police Department and US Border Patrol follow with nine wins each. In 2009, MHP Captain Hemphill set a record with his tenth win as overall champion in the National Police Shooter Competition.

== Training ==
Entry into the ranks of the Mississippi Highway Patrol requires the completion of a 23-week training program held at the MS Law Enforcement Officers Training Academy. Typically over 500 applicants apply to each class, though only 100 cadets will begin the training. Less than 50 will graduate as Troopers. Academy curriculum includes academics, law, EVOC, first aid, physical training, boxing, ground fighting and advanced officer survival. The training places extreme pressure on each cadet to test his or her will to "Never Quit". A sign in the classroom reads, "MORE SWEAT IN TRAINING LESS BLOOD ON THE HIGHWAY." Cadets attend the academy in Pearl, and live on the academy grounds sequestered from outside contact. Weekend leave may be granted upon completion of all academic and physical requirements. Weekend leave may also be canceled at any time at the request of the academy staff. Upon graduation, they are then assigned to various counties throughout the state according to the needs of the Highway Patrol. Mississippi employs an average of 550 Troopers statewide, although state law authorizes up to 650.

== Organization ==
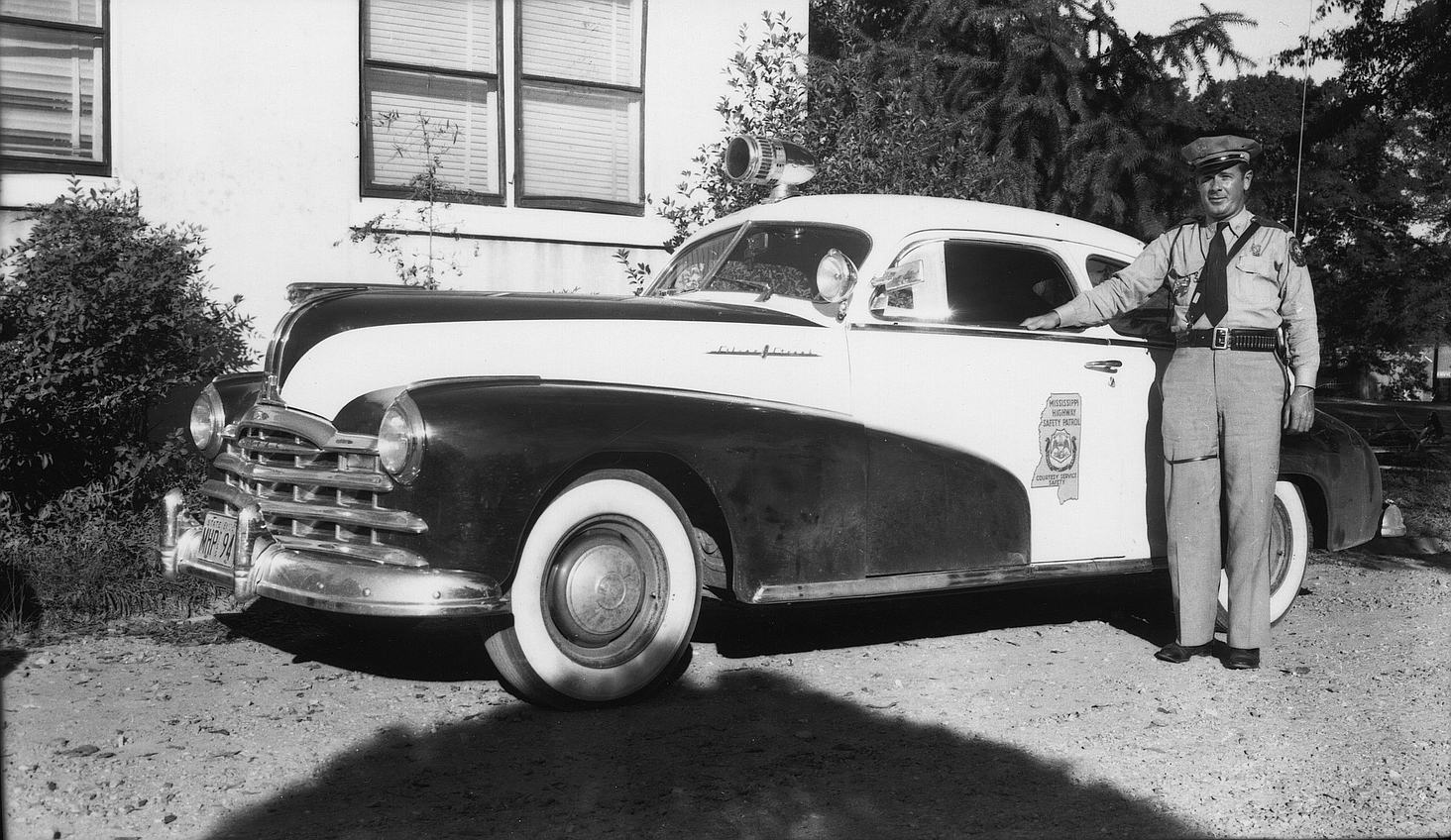
Mississippi Highway Safety Patrol, 1949

The Mississippi Highway Patrol falls under the Department of Public Safety. The Colonel is the highest-ranking officer in the Highway Patrol. Numerous departments exist within the patrol, including the Drivers License division, which is charged with the responsibility of testing and issuing drivers licenses to the residents of Mississippi. The patrol also provides a highly trained SWAT team equipped to respond to incidents throughout the state. The MHP also maintains a Special Operations Group, or SOG team, of approximately 80 troopers from all nine districts. The SOG team responds to civil disturbances, prison/jail uprisings, hurricane disasters or any emergency situation which would require more manpower than the SWAT team could provide. The SOG team is capable of deploying 100 troopers for 2 to 3 weeks without being resupplied. The patrol also hosts an 18-person Aggressive Traffic Enforcement and Motorcycles team, known as the A-TEAM. The A-TEAM is equipped with Harley Davidson police package motorcycles, and deploys to various counties to strictly enforce the traffic laws in areas with a high accident or fatality rate. The A-TEAM also provides escorts for VIPs and special events. Other departments include a drug interdiction team, motor carrier division, accident reconstruction team, honor guard detail, and training division.

Another very important division to the Highway Patrol is the Mississippi Bureau of Investigation. It falls under the Mississippi Highway Patrol, and is staffed totally by State Troopers. Mississippi Bureau of Investigation (MBI) has been given general police powers, by statute (MS Code, 45-3-21). Trooper Investigators with MBI have the power to investigate any and all crimes committed in the State of Mississippi. Under the Bureau there are also many sub-divisions. These include Special Ops, Protective Services Unit, Salvage Inspection Unit, Victim Assistance Program, as well as the Mississippi Justice Information centers. MBI is considered State Police, however, by statute, they are supposed to only exercise those powers when it is deemed totally necessary, to benefit the public safety of the citizens of Mississippi.

The Mississippi Highway Patrol uses Ford Police Interceptors and Dodge Chargers in addition to its motorcycles, as well as Chevrolet Tahoes for K-9 units. SOG units use Ford Crown Victorias as well as F-150 through F-350 trucks. MBI uses unmarked maroon, grey and black Ford Police Interceptors that are only seen in the Street Appearance Package. These cars use the same chrome grille and rear fascia of the Crown Victoria and not the black of the Police Interceptor.

The Mississippi Highway Patrol is also responsible for the protection of the coaches and players of the various collegiate sports teams of Mississippi's major public universities, including the University of Mississippi the University of Southern Mississippi and Mississippi State. The troopers who provide protection to these teams act as escorts while the teams are at home or traveling to other states. Internal Affairs Internal Affairs (IA) is a fact finding unit that reports directly to the Director of MHP. The primary function of IA is to conduct internal investigations of allegations of misconduct or other complaints filed against DPS Employees.

== District stations ==
- Troop A - Administrative Division, State Wide
- Troop B - Accident Reconstruction Team, State Wide
- Troop C - Jackson, District 1
- Troop D - Greenwood, District 2
- Troop E - Batesville, District 3
- Troop F - New Albany, District 4
- Troop G - Starkville, District 5
- Troop H - Meridian, District 6
- Troop J - Hattiesburg, District 7
- Troop K - Biloxi, District 8
- Troop M - Brookhaven, District 9
- Troop U - Commercial Vehicle Enforcement, State Wide

== Rank structure ==
| Rank | Insignia |
|---|---|
| Colonel | |
| Lieutenant Colonel | |
| Major | |
| Captain | |
| Lieutenant | |
| Master Sergeant | |
| Sergeant First Class | |
| Staff Sergeant | |
| Sergeant | |
| Corporal | |
| Trooper First Class | |
| Trooper | No Insignia |
| Cadet | No Insignia |

== Demographics ==
- Male: 98%
- Female: 2%
- White: 69%
- Black or African-American: 31%

The Mississippi Highway Safety Patrol has the highest percentage of African Americans employed as sworn officers of any U.S. state police force.

== See also ==
- List of law enforcement agencies in Mississippi
- State police
- State patrol
- Highway patrol
