= Master trooper =

Police rank

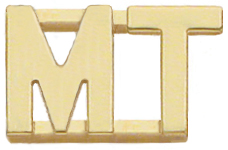
Louisiana Master Trooper insignia

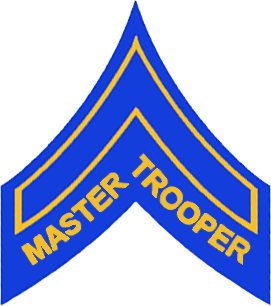
Colorado Master Trooper insignia

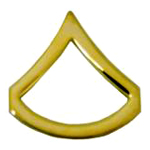
Illinois Master Trooper insignia

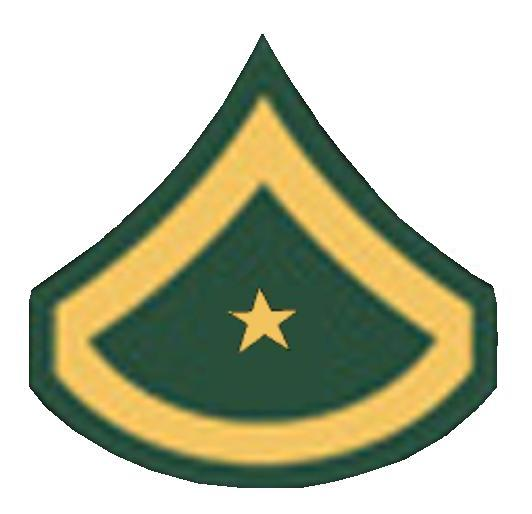
Maryland Master Trooper insignia

Master trooper is a rank used by several state police agencies within the United States and in some world militaries.

In particular, in the Louisiana State Police, in the United States, it is a rank below sergeant, yet above senior trooper. The insignia for this rank consists of a gold colored 'MT' collar pin worn on the wearer's right lapel. Troopers who complete 15 years of satisfactory or exceptional service are promoted to the rank of master trooper. The title of address is "master trooper".

Usage in other agencies or countries may vary. The rank of Master Trooper is used by the following state agencies within the United States:

- Colorado State Patrol
- Florida Highway Patrol
- Illinois State Police
- Indiana State Police
- Kansas Highway Patrol
- Kentucky State Police
- Louisiana State Police
- Maryland State Police
- North Carolina State Highway Patrol
- Ohio State Highway Patrol
- South Carolina Highway Patrol
- Virginia State Police
- Pennsylvania State Police
- Tennessee Highway Patrol

== See also ==
- Sergeant
- Senior Trooper
- Trooper first class
- Police ranks of the United States
