= Alabama Highway Patrol =

American law enforcement agency

- Patch of Alabama Highway Patrol

- Alabama Highway Patrol door seal
- Abbreviation: AHP
- Motto: Courtesy, Service, Protection

Agency overview
- Formed: 1936; 90 years ago
- Employees: 1,268 (as of 2004)

Jurisdictional structure
- Operations jurisdiction: Alabama, US
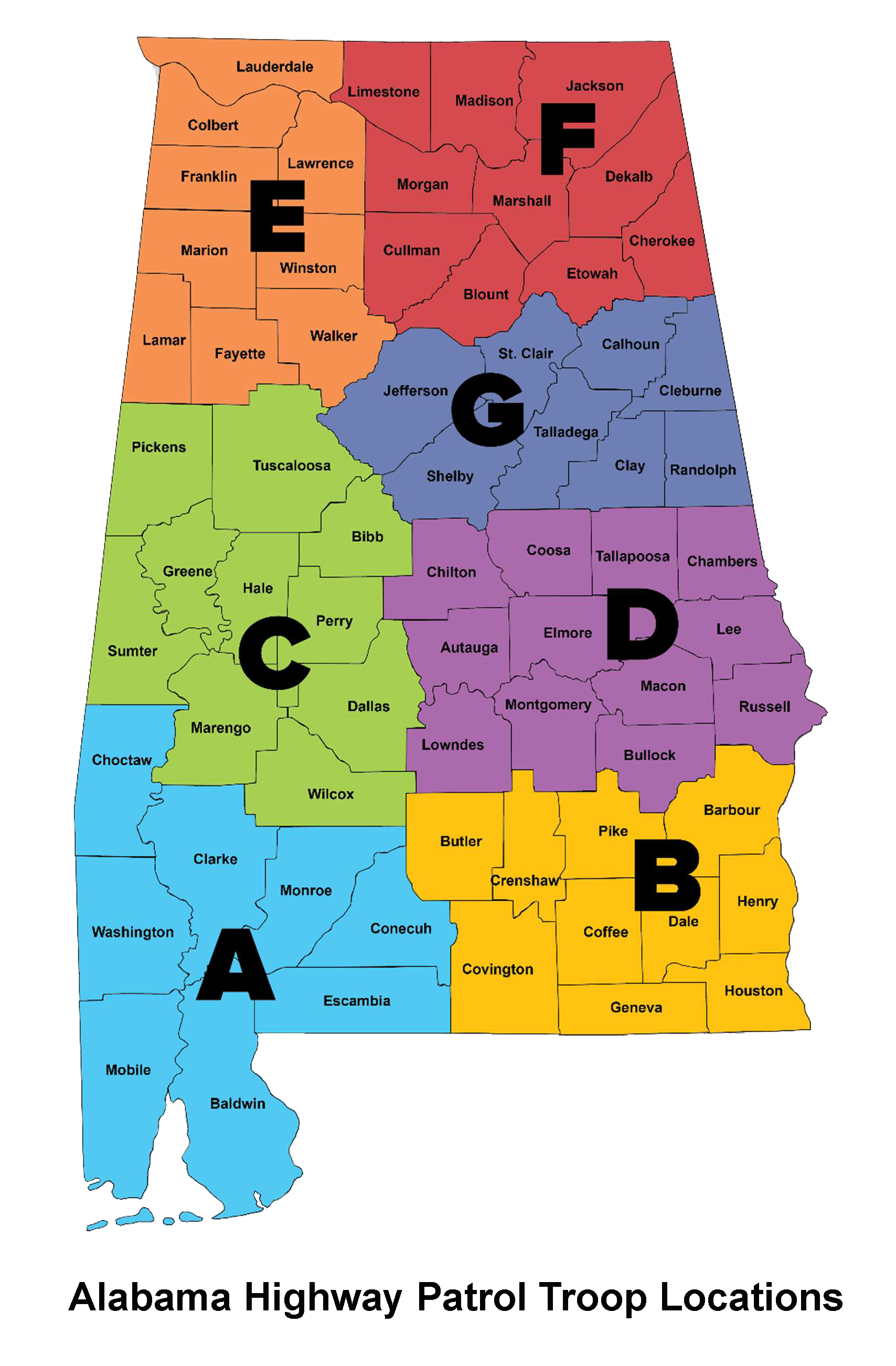
- Map of Alabama Highway Patrol's jurisdiction
- Area: 52,419 square miles (135,760 km^{2})
- Population: 5,039,877 (2021 est.)
- General nature: Civilian police

Operational structure
- Headquarters: Montgomery, Alabama
- Trooper / Special agents: ≈507 (as of 2020)
- Civilian employees: 930 (as of 2015)
- Agency executive: Jonathan Archer, Director (Colonel)
- Parent agency: Alabama Department of Public Safety

Facilities
- Posts and field offices: 17 Posts and 3 Field Offices

Website
- AHP website

The Alabama Highway Patrol is the highway patrol organization for the U.S. state of Alabama, and has complete jurisdiction anywhere in the state. Its Troopers duties include motor vehicle law enforcement and rural traffic crash investigation covering about 69,500 miles (111,800 kilometres) of rural roads, as well as special duty performance during emergencies.

The Alabama Highway Patrol was created in 1935. As of March 2024, 35 officers have died while on duty since its founding. It is subordinate to the Alabama Department of Public Safety, which is itself subordinate to the Alabama Law Enforcement Agency.

== History ==
=== Establishment ===
Governor Bibb Graves established Alabama's first statewide law enforcement agency on December 5, 1935. The Alabama Highway Patrol began with twelve motorcycle officers.

=== First pony car vehicles ===
Alabama State Trooper with patrol vehicle

In 1971, the Alabama Highway Patrol became the first police organization in the United States to use downsized vehicles for regular highway patrol duties. This pre-dated, among others, the Camaros and Mustangs used by other departments years later. AMC Javelins were the first pony cars used as police cars by any U.S. organization.

The Alabama Highway Patrol evaluated two versions supplied by Reinhardt AMC of Montgomery, Alabama: a 1971 AMC Javelin SST with a 304 cu in (5.0 L) V8 and a 1971 Javelin-AMX with a 401 cu in (6.6 L) V8 engine. Because they were so different than the traditional police cars, the Javelin AMX "was the most abused police car in the history of Alabama". The "401-cu.in. V-8, three-speed automatic and 2.87 gears were good for about 140 mph, by which point the nose of the car started to get rather light".

After this trial, the first order was for 61 cars finished in silver and ten unmarked cars in various colors. Due to further cost-cutting reasons, they were base model Javelins with heavy-duty "fleet" equipment, "machine wheels" with Goodyear Polyglas raised-white-lettered tires, and rear spoilers (factory available only on Javelin AMX models) to display the "state trooper" markings on the rear of each car. A "401" emblem covered the holes in the spoiler to replace the AMX emblem. In 1972, a total of 62 Javelins were ordered: 12 in all silver paint, 42 were finished with the hoods, decklids, and spoilers in blue over silver body as the new police car scheme, as well as eight were unmarked cars in various colors. The 1972 models were only available from AMC as "SST" versions and included additional exterior and interior trim. The 1972 versions were delivered by Reinhardt AMC and also by Bill Whitten AMC/Datsun in Birmingham.

A total of 132 Javelins were purchased between 1971 and 1972. The Javelins came with 401 cu in (6.6 L) 335 horsepower (250 kW; 340 PS) AMC V8 engines. The cars had a 1st-gear lock-out feature installed by state maintenance and were capable of going over 150 mph (240 km/h)." The last of the AMC Javelins was retired in 1979, and one of the original cars is now part of the Museum at DPS Headquarters.

== James Fowler ==
Trooper James Bonard Fowler became a significant player in escalating the acute racial conflict that led to the Selma to Montgomery marches in the civil rights movement. As a corporal in the Alabama State Police in 1965, he shot and killed an unarmed black man, Jimmie Lee Jackson, but was not prosecuted and convicted for the killing until 45 years later. In a later incident, he shot and killed an unarmed black man by the name of Nathan Johnson. Johnson had been arrested for suspicion of drunken driving on U.S. Highway 31 and was fatally shot by Fowler at the Alabaster, Alabama Police Department.

== Weapons issued ==
The currently issued sidearms for Alabama state troopers include the Glock 17 Gen5 and the Glock 45, which are both chambered in 9mm. Additional weapons provided to troopers include the Bushmaster M4-type carbine rifle and the Benelli M4 police magnum shotgun. Less-than-lethal weapons include OC (pepper) spray, ASP collapsible batons, and tasers.

== Troops ==
The Alabama Highway Patrol's troops cover the following counties as listed:

Troop	Counties covered
A	Baldwin County, Choctaw County, Clarke County, Conecuh County, Escambia County, Mobile County, Monroe County, Washington County
B	Barbour County, Butler County, Coffee County, Covington County, Crenshaw County, Dale County, Geneva County, Henry County, Houston County, Pike County
C	Bibb County, Dallas County, Greene County, Hale County, Marengo County, Perry County, Pickens County, Sumter County, Tuscaloosa County, Wilcox County
D	Autauga County, Bullock County, Chambers County, Chilton County, Coosa County, Elmore County, Lee County, Lowndes County, Macon County, Montgomery County, Russell County, Tallapoosa County
E	Colbert County, Fayette County, Franklin County, Lamar County, Lauderdale County, Lawrence County, Marion County, Walker County, Winston County
F	Blount County, Cherokee County, Cullman County, DeKalb County, Etowah County, Jackson County, Limestone County, Madison County, Marshall County, Morgan County
G	Calhoun County, Clay County, Cleburne County, Jefferson County, Randolph County, St. Clair County, Shelby County, Talladega County

== Rank structure ==
The Alabama Department of Public Safety has a paramilitary rank structure and the rank structure is as listed:

Rank	Insignia
Director (colonel)	
Assistant director (lieutenant colonel)	
Chief (major)	
Captain	
Lieutenant	
Sergeant	
Corporal	
Senior trooper	No rank insignia
Trooper	No rank insignia

== See also ==
- List of law enforcement agencies in Alabama
- State patrol
- Highway patrol
