= Wyoming Highway Patrol =

- Patch of Wyoming Highway Patrol
- Abbreviation: WHP

Agency overview
- Formed: 1933; 93 years ago
- Employees: 339 (as of 2004)

Jurisdictional structure
- Operations jurisdiction: Wyoming, USA
- Area: 97,914 square miles (253,600 km^{2})
- Population: 585,501 (2016 est.)
- General nature: Civilian police

Operational structure
- Headquarters: Cheyenne, Wyoming
- Troopers: 208 (authorised, as of 2023)
- Civilian Employees: 151 (as of 2004)
- Agency executive: KC Ramsey, Colonel
- Parent agency: Wyoming Department of Transportation

Website
- Wyoming Highway Patrol website

The Wyoming Highway Patrol is the highway patrol and de facto state police agency for the U.S. state of Wyoming, and has jurisdiction across the entire state. The goals of the Wyoming Highway Patrol are to make Wyoming's highways safer by reducing the number of traffic crashes, deaths, and injuries; to apprehend and arrest criminals using Wyoming's highways; and to assist motorists in trouble. It is also tasked with providing security and transportation to the Governor of Wyoming.

== History ==
The Wyoming Highway Patrol was created in 1933 to protect the lives, property and constitutional rights of all people in Wyoming. It was created after the Wyoming Department of Law Enforcement, whose sole duty was to enforce prohibition laws, disbanded. On May 23, 1933, the Highway Commission named Captain George Smith as the leader of the Wyoming Highway Patrol. Captain Smith, along with six other newly trained Patrolmen, left the state capital charged with the duty to “enforce the laws of the state relating to the registration and licensing of motor vehicles, the laws relating to use and operation of motor vehicles on highways, and all laws for the protection of the highways.”

As of June 2021, the Wyoming Highway Patrol has 208 troopers on patrol. In 2019, troopers investigated nearly 8,000 motor vehicle crashes across the state and removed over 1,300 intoxicated drivers from Wyoming roadways.

Currently and since 2023, the issued sidearm of the Wyoming Highway Patrol is the Glock Model 45 in 9mm Luger. Prior to 2023, the issued sidearm was the SIG Sauer P320 9mm Luger 3.9 Inch Barrel XCarry Pro Series, replacing the Glock Model 35 Gen 4 .40, which replaced the Smith & Wesson M&P .40 S&W, the Generation 3 Glock 22 .40 before that, the Beretta 96G .40 before that, the Beretta 92F 9mm Luger before that, and the Smith & Wesson Model 686 .357 Magnum before that.

== Rank structure ==
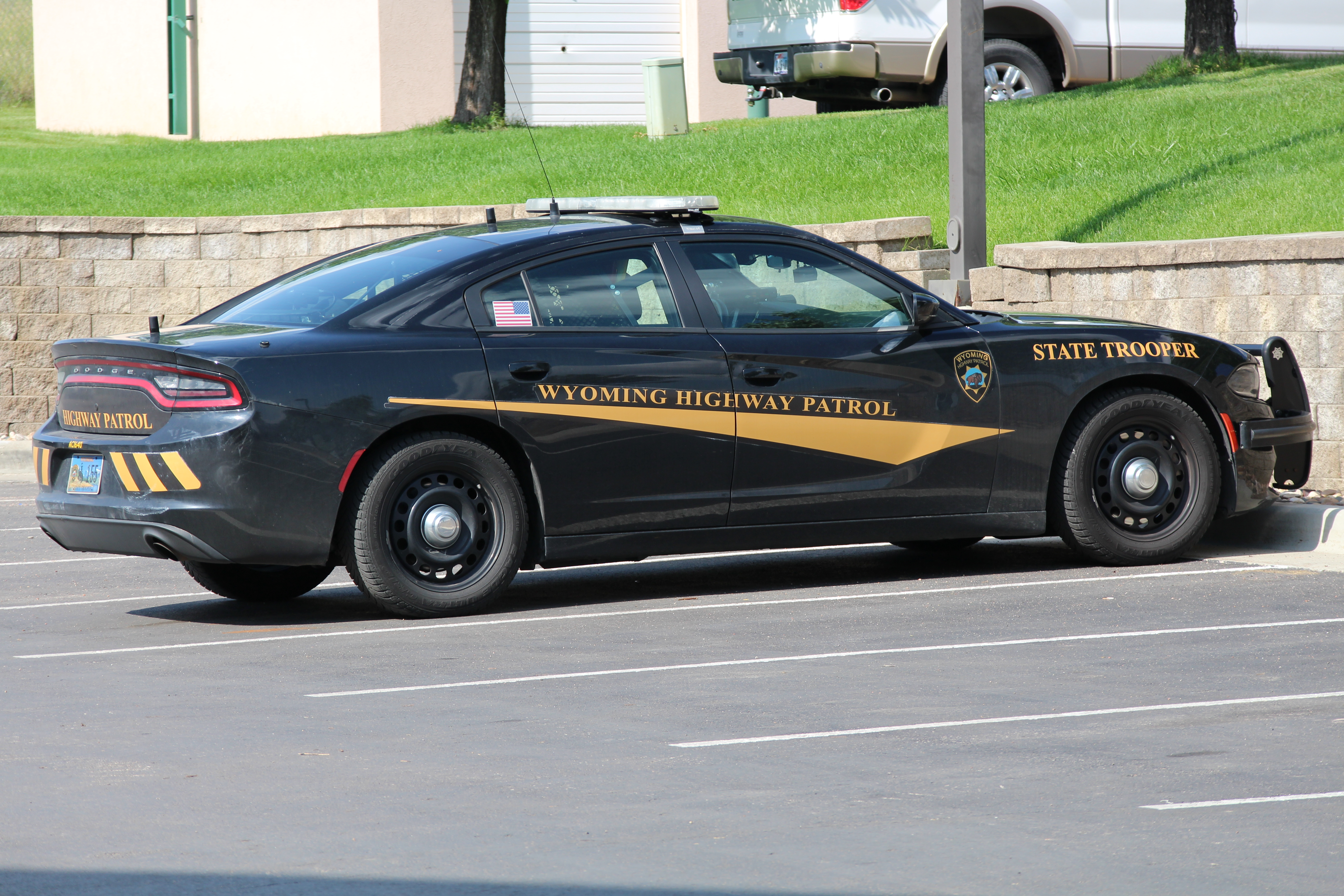
A Wyoming Highway Patrol car in Gillette

Title	Insignia
Colonel	
Lieutenant Colonel	
Major	
Captain	
Lieutenant	
Sergeant	
Trooper	No insignia

== Line of duty deaths ==
The patrol has lost two officers in the line of duty.

== See also ==
- List of law enforcement agencies in Wyoming
- State patrol
