= Trooper first class =

State police rank in the US

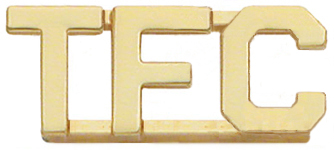

Trooper first class is a rank used by several state police agencies within the United States and in some world militaries.

In particular, in the Louisiana State Police, it is a rank below senior trooper, yet above trooper. The insignia for this rank consists of a gold colored 'TFC' collar pin worn on the wearer's right lapel. However, the Illinois State Police collar insignia is one silver chevron. In ISP, it is above trooper and below master trooper. Troopers who complete five (5) years of satisfactory or exceptional service are promoted to the rank of trooper first class. After attaining this rank, the trooper first becomes eligible to test for a supervisory position as a sergeant. The title of address is trooper or trooper first class.

Usage in other agencies or countries may vary. In the United States, state agencies are referred to state police or highway patrol. The rank of Trooper First Class is used by the following state agencies within the United States:

- Arkansas State Police
- Connecticut State Police
- Delaware State Police
- Florida Highway Patrol
- Georgia State Patrol
- Illinois State Police
- Kentucky State Police
- Louisiana State Police
- Mississippi Highway Patrol
- Pennsylvania State Police
- South Carolina Highway Patrol
- South Dakota Highway Patrol
- West Virginia State Police

== See also ==
- Private first class
- Senior trooper
- Trooper
- Police ranks of the United States
