= Chief deputy =

Rank used by American and Canadian law enforcement

Chief Deputy is a rank/title used in law enforcement in the United States and Canada. The position of chief deputy is primarily found within sheriff's offices throughout the United States, and also exists for marshals' police departments as well as constables' departments. A chief deputy may serve as the senior ranking officer below the sheriff, or below an undersheriff if that rank/title exists within an agency. Chief deputies may also be above undersheriffs depending on the sheriff's department, and in some cases the titles are synonymously used to describe the same individual.

== Responsibilities ==
The responsibilities of the individual(s) with this rank vary between agencies. However, the vast majority of departments employ the title for one of two roles, either the second-highest member of the department tasked with day-to-day operations (similar to a chief of police in agencies with a non-elected chief executive) or the commander of a large organizational element within the agency (called a "bureau" or "division" in most departments).

Below is a list of selected agencies that use the title and information regarding their use of the rank:

Agency	Insignia	Responsibilities
Fairfax County Sheriff's Office		Two personnel, each commands one of two bureaus.
Kern County Sheriff's Office		There are four personnel with the rank, each in charge of a Bureau.
Maricopa County Sheriff's Office		Second-in-Command of the agency.
San Francisco Sheriff's Office		Commands a Division within the agency.
United States Marshals Service	None	Second-in-Command of one of 94 judicial districts, each of which has a United States Marshal.
