= Police cadet =

Trainee police officer

A police cadet can refer either to a trainee police officer or to a member of a youth organization in which young people learn about and/or participate in law enforcement and police work.

Many police departments in the United States offer police cadet programs, as do a number of police forces in the United Kingdom.

== See also ==
- Police academy
- Police cadets in the United Kingdom
- Police training
