= Undersheriff =

Office title

Occupation
- Occupation type: Law enforcement official, Legal officer
- Activity sectors: Public service, Law enforcement

Description
- Competencies: Law enforcement administration, legal functions (UK)
- Education required: Varies by jurisdiction; often requires legal background or law enforcement experience.
- Fields of employment: Sheriff's offices (US), High Sheriff's office (UK)
- Related jobs: Sheriff, Chief Deputy Sheriff, Deputy Sheriff

An undersheriff (or under-sheriff) is an office derived from ancient English custom that remains in, among other places, England and Wales and the United States, though performing different functions.

== United Kingdom ==
In England, Wales, and Northern Ireland, but not in Scotland, the under-sheriff is the deputy of the High Sheriff and is appointed directly by the High Sheriff. It is a requirement of the Sheriffs Act 1887 that a High Sheriff appoints an under-sheriff within one month of taking office. In practice, the under-sheriff performs most of the legal functions of the High Sheriff for him or her. The same person (usually a solicitor) is appointed annually by successive High Sheriffs over many years, leaving the High Sheriff to perform the ceremonial functions of the office.

== United States ==
In American law enforcement, the undersheriff is the person second in charge of a sheriff's office. In some departments, the title of undersheriff is official, while in others, a different official title is used for the second person in charge. For example, in many small departments, the title of chief deputy sheriff is often used for the second in command; however, in some large departments, the undersheriff is second in command and in turn oversees several chief deputies. Vice versa, sometimes undersheriff ranks below chief deputy depending on the sheriff’s department. The undersheriff and chief deputy titles are in some cases used to describe the same individual. In some places, the undersheriff is the prison warden of the county jail.

The New York City Sheriff's Office has five undersheriffs serving each borough of New York City, overseen by the Sheriff of the City of New York. In this case, the First Deputy Sheriff, equivalent to Chief Deputy, is the second in charge of the Sheriff's Office.
