= Highway patrol =

Police unit

A highway patrol or highway police is a police unit, detail, or law enforcement agency created primarily for the purpose of overseeing and enforcing traffic safety compliance on roads and highways within a jurisdiction. They are also referred to in many countries as traffic police, although in other countries this term is more commonly used to refer to foot officers on point duty who control traffic at junctions.

In the United States, state-level law enforcement agencies (state police) are variously called "state police," "highway patrol," "state troopers," "state patrol," or "state highway patrol" Officers of these agencies are vested with the full powers of law enforcement officers, including enforcing compliance with traffic safety regulations.

In India, highway patrol operates as a specialised unit of the state police, policing national and state highways and major roads. Highway traffic enforcement and patrol duties may also be performed by local police and local traffic police.

== Functions ==
Duties of highway patrols or traffic police may include the following:

- Accident investigation: Gathering evidence to determine the cause of a roadway accident.
- Commercial vehicle enforcement: Enforcing highway laws related to commercial transport, including weight limits and hazardous materials rules.
- Education: Providing public information, handouts, and displays to encourage safe driving and usage of the roads.
- Emergency response: Securing the scene of a traffic accident by using cones and flares as well as providing first aid to the injured.
- Traffic enforcement: Enforcing laws and regulations intended to improve traffic safety, such as speed limits.

== See also ==
- Traffic police
- Traffic warden
- State police
- Police
- Chief of police
- Constable
