= Law enforcement in Los Angeles County =

Law enforcement in Los Angeles County is conducted by a variety of law enforcement agencies.

== State agencies ==
- California Highway Patrol
- University of California Police Departments
- California State University Police Department
- Exposition Park Department of Public Safety

== County agencies ==
- Los Angeles County Sheriff's Department (about 10,000 sworn Deputy Sheriffs)
- Los Angeles County Police
- Los Angeles County Probation Department

== City agencies ==
=== Alhambra ===
- Alhambra Police Department

=== Arcadia ===
- Arcadia Police Department

=== Azusa ===
- Azusa Police Department

=== Baldwin Park ===
- Baldwin Park Police Department

=== Beverly Hills ===
- Beverly Hills Police Department

=== Bell ===
- Bell Police Department

=== Bell Gardens ===
- Bell Gardens Police Department

=== Burbank ===
- Burbank Police Department

=== Claremont ===
- Claremont Police Department

=== Covina ===
- Covina Police Department

=== Culver City ===
- Culver City Police Department

=== Downey ===
- Downey Police Department

=== El Monte ===
- El Monte Police Department

=== El Segundo ===
- El Segundo Police Department

=== Gardena ===
- Gardena Police Department

=== Glendale ===
- Glendale Police Department

=== Glendora ===
- Glendora Police Department

=== Hawthorne ===
- Hawthorne Police Department

=== Hermosa Beach ===
- Hermosa Beach Police Department

=== Huntington Park ===
- Huntington Park Police Department

=== Inglewood ===
- Inglewood Police Department

=== La Verne ===
- La Verne Police Department

=== Los Angeles ===
- Los Angeles Police Department
- Los Angeles Park Ranger Division
- Los Angeles Airport Police
- Los Angeles Port Police Department
- Los Angeles School Police Department

=== Long Beach ===
- Long Beach Police Department
- Long Beach Harbor Patrol

=== Manhattan Beach ===
- Manhattan Beach Police Department

=== Monrovia ===
- Monrovia Police Department

=== Montebello ===
- Montebello Police Department

=== Monterey Park ===
- Monterey Park Police Department

=== Palos Verdes Estates ===
- Palos Verdes Estates Police Department

=== Pasadena ===
- Pasadena Police Department

=== Pomona ===
- Pomona Police Department

=== Redondo Beach ===
- Redondo Beach Police Department

=== San Fernando ===
- San Fernando Police Department

=== San Gabriel ===
- San Gabriel Police Department

=== San Marino ===
- San Marino Police Department

=== Santa Fe Springs ===
- Santa Fe Springs Police Department

=== Santa Monica ===
- Santa Monica Police Department

=== Sierra Madre ===
- Sierra Madre Police Department

=== Signal Hill ===
- Signal Hill Police Department

=== South Gate ===
- South Gate Police Department

=== South Pasadena ===
- South Pasadena Police Department

=== Torrance ===
- Torrance Police Department

=== Vernon ===
- Vernon Police Department

=== West Covina ===
- West Covina Police Department

=== Whittier ===
- Whittier Police Department

== Special District agencies ==
- Los Angeles Society for the Prevention of Cruelty to Animals Los Angeles Law Enforcement Division

== Railroad agencies ==
=== Union Pacific Railroad ===
- Union Pacific Police Department

=== Burlington Northern Santa Fe Railway ===
- BNSF Police Department

== See also ==
- List of law enforcement agencies in California
