= Sierra Madre Police Department =

Police agency for the city of Sierra Madre, California

- Sierra Madre Police patch
- Abbreviation: SMPD
- Motto: "Serving those we protect"

Agency overview
- Formed: 1928
- Employees: 33
- Volunteers: 15
- Annual budget: $3,722,400 (2018)

Jurisdictional structure
- Operations jurisdiction: Sierra Madre, California, USA
- Area: 2.597 square miles (6.73 km^{2})
- Population: 10,917
- General nature: Local civilian police

Operational structure
- Police Officers: 16 (2018)
- Unsworn Members: 17 (2018)
- Agency executive: Gustavo Barrientos, Police Chief

Website
- Official Site

The Sierra Madre Police Department is the police department serving Sierra Madre, California. The headquarters of the Sierra Madre Police Department is located at 242 West Sierra Madre Boulevard, and adjacent to Sierra Madre City Hall. The department employs 16 sworn officers, 4 non-sworn dispatchers and 1 non-sworn community service officers.

== Overview ==
The Sierra Madre Police Department was founded in 1928 when Gordon MacMillan was inaugurated as the first chief of police. When chief MacMillan took office the police facility was located near city hall. In the late 1980s and 1990s, Sierra Madre was praised as the safest city in Los Angeles County while the City of Los Angeles was experiencing a drug fueled crime wave. As of 2014 it continues to be one of the safest cities in the county which crimes trend experts have attributed to inaccessibility and a primarily single-family population. In 2006 the Sierra Madre Police Department made history when their Mayor appointed Marilyn Diaz, the first ever female police chief for Los Angeles County. Five years later, Chief Diaz retired with the support of the Mayor but after conflict between her and the other sworn members of her police department who gave her a vote of no confidence through their police association in 2008. In June 2014 two men were caught by the Sierra Madre Police at a local Valero station while they were attempting to install a credit card skimming device. The crime was investigated by the department's one sworn detective who is responsible for investigating all crimes that can not be investigated by the patrol division.

In March 2023, the SMPD swore in the new police chief, Gustavo Barrientos.

== See also ==
- List of law enforcement agencies in California
- Pasadena Police Department (California)
- Arcadia Police Department
- Law enforcement in Los Angeles County
