= List of law enforcement agencies in California =

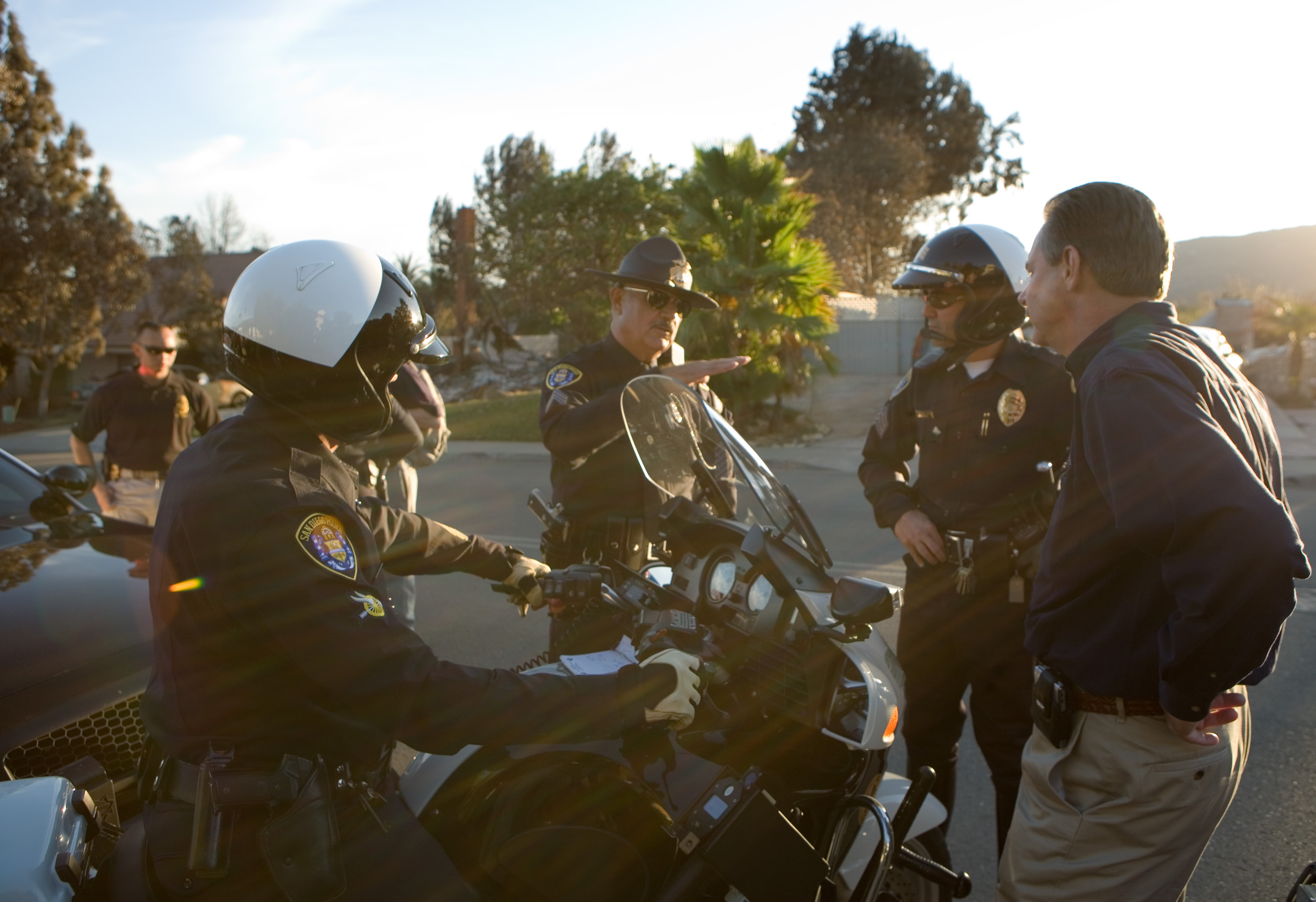
San Diego Police officers confer with FEMA Administrator David Paulison during the October 2007 California wildfires.

According to the U.S. Bureau of Justice Statistics' 2008 Census of State and Local Law Enforcement Agencies, 509 law enforcement agencies exist in the U.S. state of California, employing 79,431 sworn police officers—about 217 for each 100,000 residents.

California police officers' authority is derived from the California Penal Code (PC) beginning with Section 830. PC 830.1 includes the California Department of Justice (CA DOJ) along with local and county agencies. PC 830.2 includes the California Highway Patrol (CHP) and nine other state agencies. PC 830.3 includes 21 state agencies with law enforcement divisions.

The California Commission on Peace Officer Standards and Training maintains a list of state law enforcement agencies on its website.

== State agencies ==
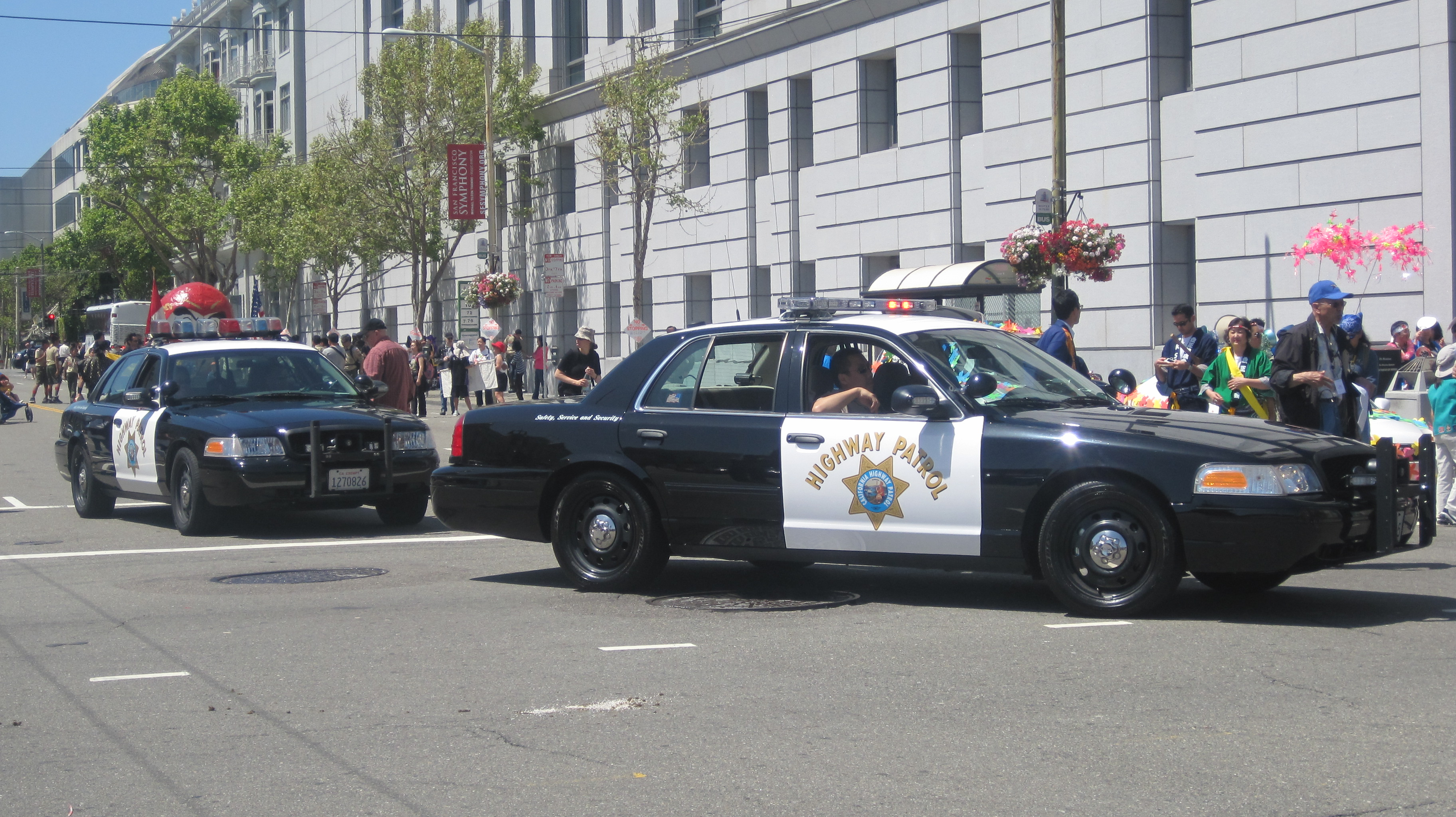
California Highway Patrol vehicles, 2010.

- California Department of Justice
  - Division of Law Enforcement
    - California Bureau of Investigation
    - California Bureau of Firearms
    - California Bureau of Forensic Services
    - California Bureau of Gambling Control
  - Division of Medi-Cal Fraud & Elder Abuse
- California Department of Corrections and Rehabilitation
- Business, Consumer Services and Housing Agency
  - California Department of Alcoholic Beverage Control
  - California Department of Consumer Affairs Division of Investigation
- California Natural Resources Agency
  - California Department of Fish and Wildlife
  - California State Parks Peace Officers
- California Environmental Protection Agency
  - California Department of Toxic Substances Control
- California State Transportation Agency
  - California Department of Motor Vehicles Investigations Division
  - California Highway Patrol
- California Department of Insurance Fraud Division
- California Government Operations Agency
  - California Franchise Tax Board Criminal Investigations Bureau (CFTB-CIB)
- California Lottery Security Law Enforcement Division
- California Health and Human Services Agency
  - California Department of Health Care Services
  - California Department of Public Health
  - California Department of State Hospitals Law Enforcement Office of Protective Services (California Department of State Hospitals Police)
  - California Department of Developmental Services Office of Protective Services
- California Labor and Workforce Development Agency
  - California Employment Development Department Investigation Division

== County agencies ==
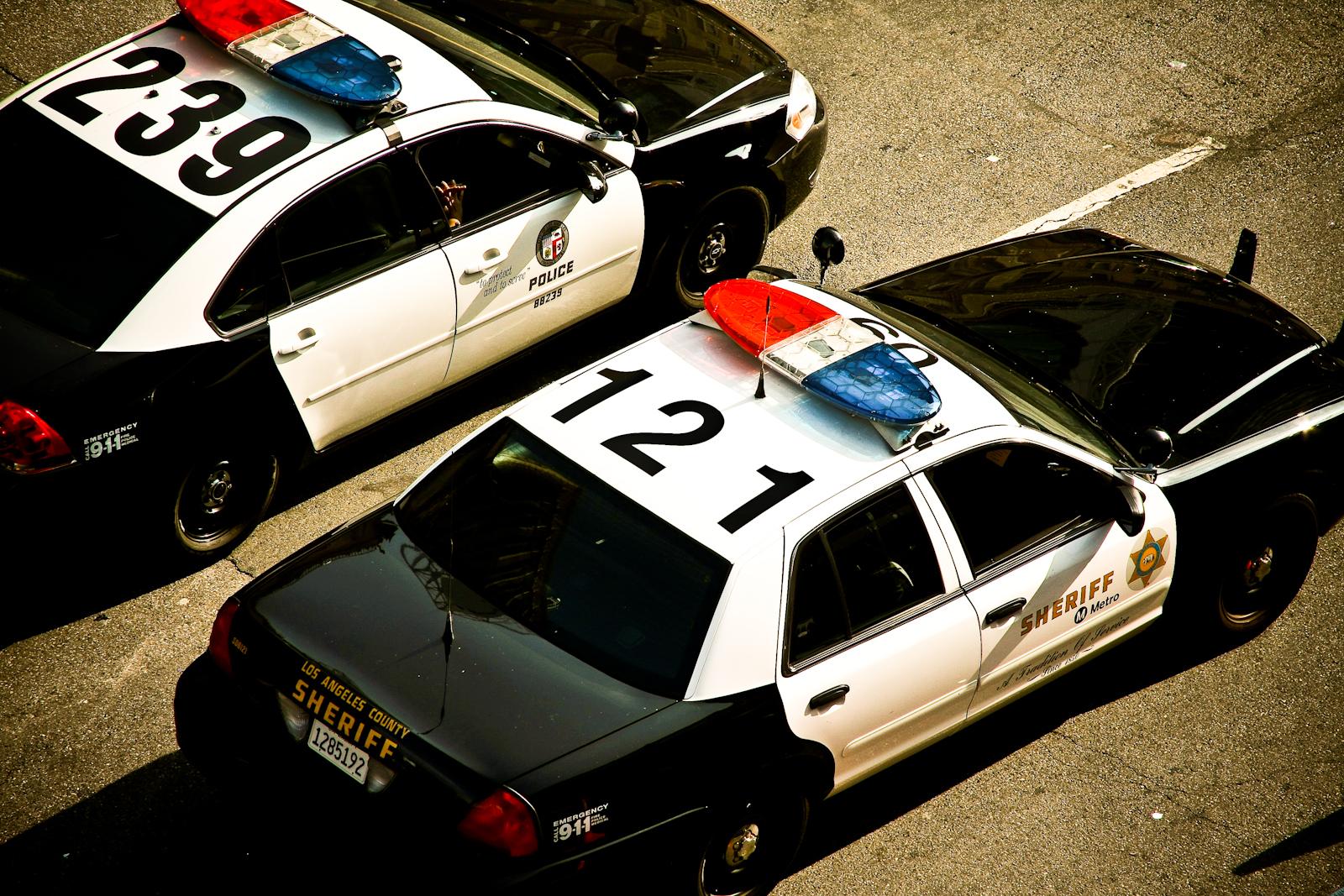
Los Angeles Police Department (top) and Los Angeles County Sheriff's Department Transit Services Bureau (bottom) patrol cars

- Alameda County Sheriff's Office
- Alameda County Probation Department
- Alpine County Sheriff's Office
- Amador County Sheriff's Office
- Butte County Sheriff's Department
- Calaveras County Sheriff's Department
- Colusa County Sheriff's Office
- Contra Costa County Sheriff's Office
- Del Norte County Sheriff's Office
- El Dorado County Sheriff's Office
- Fresno County Sheriff's Office
- Glenn County Sheriff's Office
- Humboldt County Sheriff's Office
- Imperial County Sheriff's Office
- Inyo County Sheriff's Office
- Kern County Sheriff's Office
- Kern County Probation Department
- Kern County Parks and Recreation Park Rangers
- Kings County Sheriff's Office
- Lake County Sheriff's Department
- Lassen County Sheriff's Office
- Los Angeles County Sheriff's Department (LASD)
- Los Angeles County Probation Department
- Madera County Sheriff's Department
- Marin County Sheriff's Office
- Mariposa County Sheriff's Department
- Mendocino County Sheriff's Office
- Merced County Sheriff's Office
- Modoc County Sheriff's Office
- Mono County Sheriff's Department
- Monterey County Sheriff's Office
- Napa County Sheriff's Department
- Nevada County Sheriff's Office
- Orange County Sheriff's Department
- Placer County Sheriff's Office
- Plumas County Sheriff's Office
- Riverside County Sheriff's Department
- Sacramento County Sheriff's Department
- Sacramento County Park Rangers
- San Benito County Sheriff's Office
- San Bernardino County Sheriff's Department
- San Bernardino County Probation Department
- San Diego County Sheriff's Department
- San Diego County Probation Department
- San Francisco Sheriff's Department
- San Joaquin County Sheriff's Department
- San Luis Obispo County Sheriff's Department
- San Mateo County Sheriff's Office
- Santa Barbara County Sheriff's Office
- Santa Clara County Sheriff's Office
- Santa Clara County Park Rangers
- Santa Clara County Department of Correction
- Santa Cruz County Sheriff's Office
- Shasta County Sheriff's Office
- Shasta County Marshal's Office
- Sierra County Sheriff's Office
- Siskiyou County Sheriff's Department
- Solano County Sheriff's Office
- Sonoma County Sheriff's Department
- Sonoma County Park Rangers
- Stanislaus County Sheriff's Department
- Sutter County Sheriff's Department
- Tehama County Sheriff's Office
- Trinity County Sheriff's Department
- Trinity County Marshal's Office
- Tulare County Sheriff's Office
- Tuolumne County Sheriff's Office
- Ventura County Sheriff's Office
- Yolo County Sheriff's Department
- Yuba County Sheriff's Department

== Municipal agencies ==
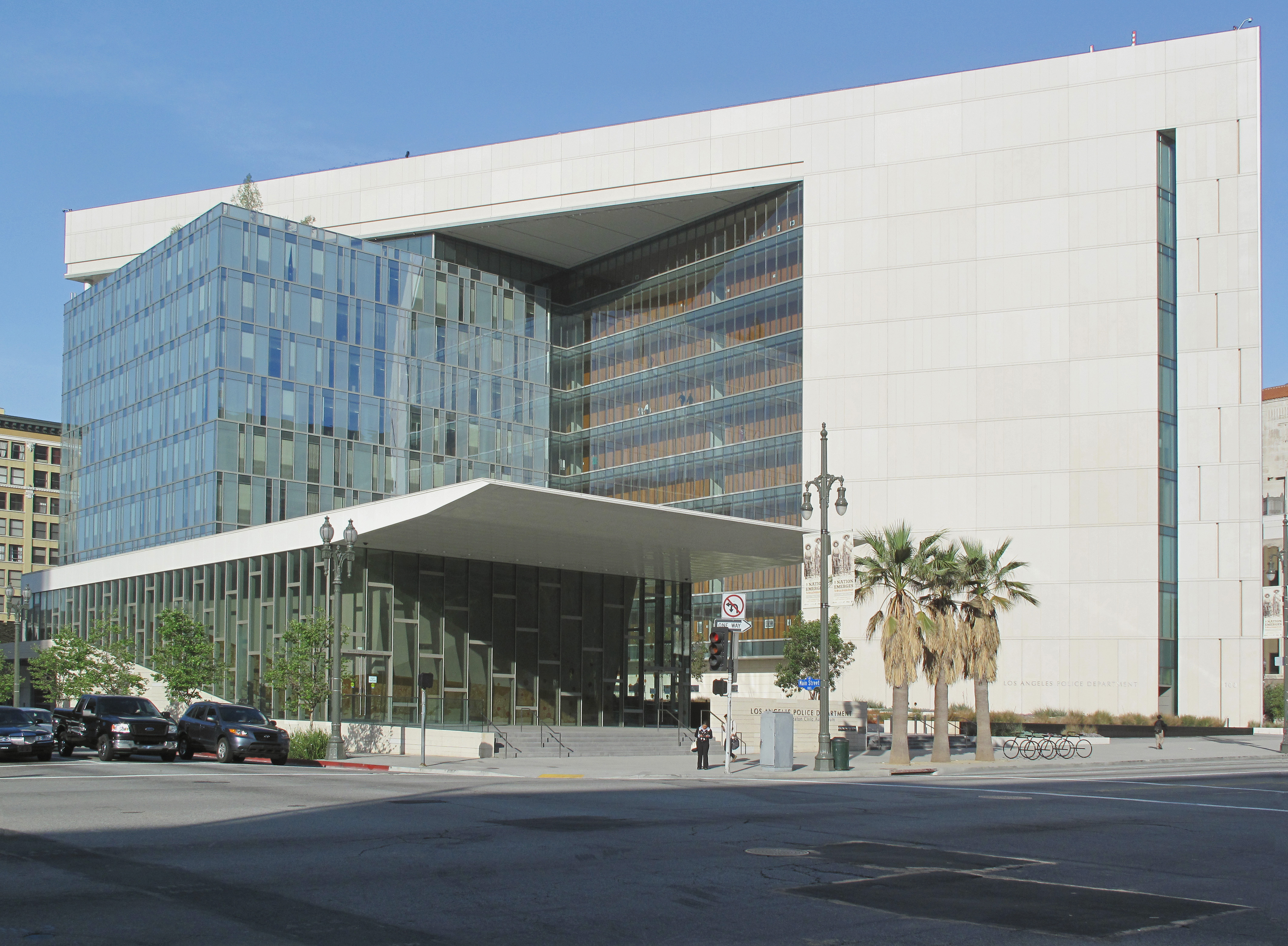
The LAPD Administration Building, headquarters of the Los Angeles Police Department, on 1st Street in downtown Los Angeles.

- Alameda Police Department
- Albany Police Department
- Alhambra Police Department
- Alturas Police Department
- Anaheim Police Department
- Anderson Police Department
- Angels Camp Police Department
- Antioch Police Department
- Arcadia Police Department
- Arcata Police Department
- Arroyo Grande Police Department
- Arvin Police Department
- Atascadero Police Department
- Atherton Police Department
- Atwater Police Department
- Auburn Police Department
- Avenal Police Department
- Azusa Police Department
- Bakersfield Police Department
- Baldwin Park Police Department
- Banning Police Department
- Barstow Police Department
- Bear Valley Police Department
- Beaumont Police Department
- Bell Police Department
- Bell Gardens Police Department
- Belmont Police Department
- Belvedere Police Department
- Benicia Police Department
- Berkeley Police Department
- Beverly Hills Police Department
- Bishop Police Department
- Blythe Police Department
- Brawley Police Department
- Brea Police Department
- Brentwood Police Department
- Brisbane Police Department
- Buena Park Police Department
- Burbank Police Department
- Burlingame Police Department
- Calexico Police Department
- California City Police Department
- Calipatria Police Department
- Calistoga Police Department
- Campbell Police Department
- Capitola Police Department
- Carlsbad Police Department
- Carmel Police Department
- Cathedral City Police Department
- Central Marin Police Authority (joint powers agency comprising the cities of Corte Madera, Larkspur, and San Anselmo)
- Ceres Police Department
- Chico Police Department
- Chino Police Department
- Chowchilla Police Department
- Chula Vista Police Department
- Citrus Heights Police Department
- Claremont Police Department
- Clayton Police Department
- Clearlake Police Department
- Cloverdale Police Department
- Clovis Police Department
- Coalinga Police Department
- Colma Police Department
- Colton Police Department
- Colusa Police Department
- Concord Police Department
- Corcoran Police Department
- Corning Police Department
- Corona Police Department
- Coronado Police Department
- Costa Mesa Police Department
- Cotati Police Department
- Covina Police Department
- Crescent City Police Department
- Culver City Police Department
- Cypress Police Department
- Daly City Police Department
- Davis Police Department
- Del Rey Oaks Police Department
- Delano Police Department
- Desert Hot Springs Police Department
- Dinuba Police Department
- Dixon Police Department
- Dos Pablos Police Department
- Downey Police Department
- East Palo Alto Police Department
- El Cajon Police Department
- El Centro Police Department
- El Cerrito Police Department
- El Monte Police Department
- El Segundo Police Department
- Elk Grove Police Department
- Emeryville Police Department
- Escalon Police Department
- Escondido Police Department
- Etna Police Department
- Eureka Police Department
- Exeter Police Department
- Fairfax Police Department
- Fairfield Police Department
- Farmersville Police Department
- Ferndale Police Department
- Firebaugh Police Department
- Folsom Police Department
- Fontana Police Department
- Fort Bragg Police Department
- Fortuna Police Department
- Foster City Police Department
- Fountain Valley Police Department
- Fowler Police Department
- Fremont Police Department
- Fresno Police Department
- Fullerton Police Department
- Galt Police Department
- Garden Grove Police Department
- Gardena Police Department
- Gilroy Police Department
- Glendale Police Department
- Glendora Police Department
- Gonzales Police Department
- Grass Valley Police Department
- Greenfield Police Department
- Gridley Police Department
- Grover Beach Police Department
- Guadlupe Police Department
- Gustine Police Department
- Hanford Police Department
- Hawthorne Police Department
- Hayward Police Department
- Healdsburg Police Department
- Hemet Police Department
- Hercules Police Department
- Hermosa Beach Police Department
- Hillsborough Police Department
- Hollister Police Department
- Huntington Beach Police Department
- Huntington Park Police Department
- Huron Police Department
- Imperial Police Department
- Indio Police Department
- Inglewood Police Department
- Ione Police Department
- Irvine Police Department
- Irwindale Police Department
- Jackson Police Department
- Kensington Police Department
- Kerman Police Department
- King City Police Department
- Kingsburg Police Department
- La Habra Police Department
- La Mesa Police Department
- La Palma Police Department
- La Verne Police Department
- Laguna Beach Police Department
- Lakeport Police Department
- Lathrop Police Department
- Lemoore Police Department
- Lincoln Police Department
- Lindsay Department of Public Safety
- Livermore Police Department
- Livingston Police Department
- Lodi Police Department
- Lompoc Police Department
- Long Beach Police Department
- Los Alamitos Police Department
- Los Altos Police Department
- Los Angeles Police Department
- Los Angeles Bureau of Street Services, Investigation and Enforcement Division
- Los Angeles Sanitation and Environmental, Compliance and Enforcement Division
- Los Banos Police Department
- Los Gatos/Monte Sereno Police Department
- Madera Police Department
- Mammoth Lakes Police Department
- Manhattan Beach Police Department
- Manteca Police Department
- Marina Police Department
- Martinez Police Department
- Marysville Police Department
- McFarland Police Department
- Mendota Police Department
- Menifee Police Department
- Menlo Park Police Department
- Maricopa Police Department
- Merced Police Department
- Mill Valley Police Department
- Milpitas Police Department
- Modesto Police Department
- Monrovia Police Department
- Montclair Police Department
- Montebello Police Department
- Monterey Police Department
- Monterey Park Police Department
- Moraga Police Department
- Morgan Hill Police Department
- Morro Bay Police Department
- Mount Shasta Police Department
- Mountain View Police Department
- Murrieta Police Department
- Napa Police Department
- National City Police Department
- Nevada City Police Department
- Newark Police Department
- Newman Police Department
- Newport Beach Police Department
- Novato Police Department
- Oakdale Police Department
- Oakland Police Department
- Oakland Housing Authority Police Department
- Oakley Police Department
- Oceanside Police Department
- Ontario Police Department
- Orange Police Department
- Orange Cove Police Department
- Orland Police Department
- Oroville Police Department
- Oxnard Police Department
- Pacific Grove Police Department
- Pacifica Police Department
- Palm Springs Police Department
- Palo Alto Police Department
- Palos Verdes Estates Police Department
- Paradise Police Department
- Parlier Police Department
- Pasadena Police Department
- Paso Robles Police Department
- Petaluma Police Department
- Piedmont Police Department
- Pinole Police Department
- Pismo Beach Police Department
- Pittsburg Police Department
- Placentia Police Department
- Placerville Police Department
- Pleasant Hill Police Department
- Pleasanton Police Department
- Pomona Police Department
- Port Hueneme Police Department
- Porterville Police Department
- Red Bluff Police Department
- Redding Police Department
- Redlands Police Department
- Redondo Beach Police Department
- Redwood City Police Department
- Reedley Police Department
- Rialto Police Department
- Richmond Police Department
- Ridgecrest Police Department
- Rio Dell Police Department
- Ripon Police Department
- Riverside Police Department
- Rocklin Police Department
- Rohnert Park Department of Public Safety
- Roseville Police Department
- Ross Police Department
- Sacramento Police Department
- Salinas Police Department
- San Bernardino Police Department
- San Bruno Police Department
- San Carlos Police Department
- San Diego Police Department
- San Fernando Police Department
- San Francisco Police Department
- San Gabriel Police Department
- San Jose Police Department
- San Leandro Police Department
- San Luis Obispo Police Department
- San Marino Police Department
- San Mateo Police Department
- San Pablo Police Department
- San Rafael Police Department
- San Ramon Police Department
- Sand City Police Department
- Sanger Police Department
- Santa Ana Police Department
- Santa Barbara Police Department
- Santa Clara Police Department
- Santa Cruz Police Department
- Santa Maria Police Department
- Santa Monica Police Department
- Santa Paula Police Department
- Santa Rosa Police Department
- Sausalito Police Department
- Scotts Valley Police Department
- Seal Beach Police Department
- Seaside Police Department
- Sebastopol Police Department
- Selma Police Department
- Shafter Police Department
- Sierra Madre Police Department
- Signal Hill Police Department
- Simi Valley Police Department
- Soledad Police Department
- Sonora Police Department
- South Gate Police Department
- South Lake Tahoe Police Department
- South Pasadena Police Department
- South San Francisco Police Department
- St. Helena Police Department
- Stockton Police Department
- Suisun City Police Department
- Sunnyvale Department of Public Safety
- Susanville Police Department
- Sutter Creek Police Department
- Taft Police Department
- Tehachapi Police Department
- Tiburon Police Department
- Torrance Police Department
- Tracy Police Department
- Truckee Police Department
- Tulare Police Department
- Tulelake Police Department
- Turlock Police Department
- Tustin Police Department
- Ukiah Police Department
- Union City Police Department
- Upland Police Department
- Vacaville Police Department
- Vallejo Police Department
- Ventura Police Department
- Vernon Police Department
- Visalia Police Department
- Walnut Creek Police Department
- Watsonville Police Department
- Weed Police Department
- West Covina Police Department
- West Sacramento Police Department
- Westminster Police Department
- Westmoreland Police Department
- Wheatland Police Department
- Whittier Police Department
- Williams Police Department
- Willits Police Department
- Winters Police Department
- Woodlake Police Department
- Woodland Police Department
- Yreka Police Department
- Yuba City Police Department

== Tribal agencies ==
- Bear River Police Department
- Blue Lake Rancheria Tribal Police Department
- Cahto Tribal Police Department
- Hoopa Valley Tribal Police Department
- Round Valley Tribal Police Department
- Yurok Tribal Police Department

== College and university agencies ==
- Azusa Pacific University Campus Safety
- California State University police departments
- Chapman University Department of Public Safety
- Notre Dame de Namur University Department of Public Safety
- Saint Mary's College of California Department of Public Safety
- Stanford University Department of Public Safety
- University of California police departments
- University of the Pacific Police Department
- University of San Diego Department of Public Safety
- University of San Francisco Department of Public Safety
- University of Southern California Department of Public Safety

=== Community colleges ===
- Allan Hancock Community College Police Department
- Antelope Valley College District Police
- Cerritos Community College Police Department
- Chaffey College Police Department
- Coastline Community College District Police Department
- Coastline Community College Public Safety
- College of the Sequoias District Police Department
- Compton College Police Department
- Contra Costa Community College District Police Services
- Crafton Hills Community College Police Services
- Cuesta College Police Department
- El Camino College Police Department
- Foothill-De Anza College District Police Department
- Glendale Community College District Police Department
- Goldenwest College Public Safety
- Hartnell College Campus Safety Department
- Irvine Valley College Police Department
- Los Rios Community College Police Department
- Marin Community College District Police Department
- Merced Community College Police Department
- MiraCosta Community College Police Department
- Napa Valley College Police Department
- Palomar College Police Department
- Pasadena Area Community College District Police Department
- Riverside Community College District Police
- Saddleback College Police Department
- San Bernardino Community College District Police Department
- San Diego Community College District Police Department
- San Francisco Community College Police Department
- San Joaquin Delta College District Police Department
- San Jose/Evergreen College District Police Department
- San Mateo Community College District Department of Public Safety
- Santa Rosa Junior College District Police Department
- Santa Monica College Police Department
- Shasta College Campus Safety Department
- Solano Community College Police Department
- South Orange County Community College District Department of Campus Safety
- Southwestern Community College Police Department
- State Center Community College District Police Department
- Ventura County Community College Police Department
- Victor Valley College Police Department
- West Valley-Mission Community College District Police
- Yuba College Police Department

== K–12 school agencies ==
- Apple Valley Unified School District Police Department
- Baldwin Park Unified School District Police
- Clovis Unified School District Police Department
- Compton Unified School District Police Department
- El Rancho Unified School District Police Department
- Elk Grove Unified School District Police Department
- Fontana Unified School District Police Department
- Hacienda La Puente Unified School District Police Department
- Hesperia School District Police Department
- Huntington Beach Union High School District Police Department
- Inglewood Unified School District Police Department
- Kern High School District Police Department
- Los Angeles School Police Department
- Long Beach Unified School District School Safety Department
- Montebello Unified School District Police Department
- Norwalk-La Mirada Unified School District School Safety Department
- San Bernardino City Unified School District Police Department
- San Diego Unified School District Police Department
- San José Unified School District Police Department
- Santa Ana Unified School District Police Department
- Snowline Joint Unified School District Police Department
- Stockton Unified School District Police Department
- Twin Rivers Unified School District Police Department
- Val Verde Unified School Police Department
- Victor Valley Union High School District Police Department
- West Contra Costa Unified School District Police Department

== Special district and other agencies ==
- Bear Valley Police Department (Bear Valley Community Services District)
- Bethel Island Municipal Improvement District (BIMID)
- Broadmoor Police Protection District
- Capistrano Bay Police Department (Capistrano Bay Community Services District)
- Kensington Police Protection and Community Services District
- Lake Shastina Police Department (Lake Shastina C.S.D.)
- Stallion Springs Police Department
- Town of Discovery Bay Community Services District (CSD)

=== Animal ===
- Los Angeles Society for the Prevention of Cruelty to Animals Law Enforcement Division
- San Diego Humane Society Humane Law Enforcement

=== Parks ===
- California Exposition & State Fair Police (Cal Expo Police)
- East Bay Regional Park District Police Department
- Exposition Park Department of Public Safety
- Fulton–El Camino Park Police Department
- Long Beach Park Rangers (enveloped into Long Beach Police Department, disbandment proposed in late 2022)
- Los Angeles Park Ranger Division
- Midpeninsula Regional Open Space District Ranger Division
- Montebello Park Rangers
- Monterey County Park Rangers
- San Francisco Park Patrol
- Santa Ana Park Rangers
- Mountains Recreation and Conservation Authority Rangers

=== Transit ===
- BART Police
- Metropolitan Transit System Police Department
- Napa Valley Railroad Police Department
- Sacramento Regional Transit Police

=== Airport ===
- Burbank-Glendale-Pasadena Airport Authority Police
- Los Angeles Airport Police
- Kern County Airport Police
- Monterey Peninsula Airport Police
- Stockton Metropolitan Airport Police
- Santa Barbara Municipal Airport Airport Police

=== Port and harbor ===
- Long Beach Harbor Patrol
- Los Angeles Port Police
- Port of San Diego Harbor Police
- Port of Stockton Police
- Santa Cruz Harbor Patrol

== Defunct agencies ==
- California State Police (merged into California Highway Patrol in 1995)
- California State Rangers (disbanded in 1853)
- California Bureau of Narcotic Enforcement (merged into California Bureau of Investigation in 2012)
- Alviso Police Department (merged into San Jose Police Department in 1968, when City of Alviso annexed into City of San Jose)
- Avalon Police Department (replaced by Los Angeles County Sheriff's Department in 1962)
- Blue Lake Police Department (merged with Humboldt County Sheriff's Department in 2008, partially replaced by Blue Lake Rancheria Tribal Police Department)
- Compton Police Department (disbanded in 2000, replaced by Los Angeles County Sheriff's Department)
- Dorris Police Department (replaced by Siskiyou County Sheriff's Office in 1996)
- Dunsmuir Police Department (replaced by Siskiyou County Sheriff's Office in 1992)
- Ft. Jones Police Department (replaced by Etna Police Department in December 12, 2019)
- Grossmont-Cuyamaca Community College Police Department (replaced by San Diego County Sheriff's Department in 2013)
- Half Moon Bay Police Department (replaced by San Mateo County Sheriff's Office in 2011)
- Holtville Police Department (merged into Imperial County Sheriffs' Office in 2010)
- Housing Authority City of Los Angeles Police Department (replaced by Los Angeles Police Department, December 31, 2003)
- Imperial Beach Police Department (merged into San Diego County Sheriff's Department, 1982)
- Isleton Police Department (replaced by Sacramento County Sheriff's Department, 2012)
- Los Angeles City Marshal (disbanded in 1876)
- Los Angeles General Services Police (now replaced by Los Angeles Police Department (LAPD) Security Services Division in 2012)
- Los Angeles Community College District Police Department (merged into LASD Community College Bureau in 2001)
- Los Angeles County Office of Public Safety (dissolved in 2010, duties assumed by the LASD County Services Bureau and Parks Bureau)
- Los Angeles County Marshal’s Department (merged into Los Angeles County Sheriff’s Department in 1994)
- Los Angeles County Metropolitan Transportation Authority Transit Police Department (disbanded, assets divided between LAPD and LASD, 1997; formerly the Southern California Rapid Transit District (RTD) Transit Police Department and RTD Transit Public Safety Department)
- Los Angeles Metropolitan Transit Authority Special Agents Department
- Los Angeles Railway Special Agents Department (merged into Los Angeles Metropolitan Transit Authority Special Agents Department, 1958)
- Maricopa Police Department (merged into Kern County Sheriff's Office in 2011)
- Maywood-Cudahy Police Department (disbanded, June 30, 2010; replaced by LASD)
- Millbrae Police Department (replaced by San Mateo County Sheriff's Office in 2012)
- Montague Police Department (replaced by Siskiyou County Sheriff's Office in 1983)
- Needles Police Department (ceased as independent Police Department, now part of San Bernardino County Sheriff’s Department under contract policing in 1989)
- Oakland Unified School District Police Department (disbanded in 2020)
- Orange County Marshal’s Department (absorbed into Orange County Sheriff's Department in 1 July 2000)
- Pacific Electric Special Agents Department (merged into Los Angeles Metropolitan Transit Authority Special Agents Department, 1958)
- San Benito County Marshal's Office (closed in 2010, duties transferred to San Benito County Sheriff's Office Civil Bureau)
- San Bernardino County Marshal’s Department (Merged into San Bernardino County Sheriff's Department Court Services Division in 1999)
- Santa Clara County Transit Police (replaced by Santa Clara County Sheriff's Department Transit Patrol Division)
- San Anselmo Police Department (merged into Twin Cities Police Authority to form Central Marin Police Authority in 2013)
- San Carlos Police Department (replaced by San Mateo County Sheriff's Office in 2010)
- San Diego County Marshal's Office (merged into San Diego County Sheriff's Department Court Services Bureau on January 1, 2000)
- San Juan Bautista Police Department (replaced by San Benito County Sheriff’s Office in 1993)
- Stanton Police Department (merged into Orange County Sheriff's Department (OCSD), February 1988)
- San Francisco Patrol Special Police (disbanded in 2024)
- Trinidad Police Department (duties assumed by Humboldt County Sheriff's Department, 2010; partially replaced by Trinidad Rancheria Police Department)
- Twin Cities Police Authority (merged with San Anselmo Police Department form into Central Marin Police Authority in 2013)
- Willows Police Department (replaced by Glenn County Sheriff's Office, July 1, 2017)

== See also ==
- Crime in California
- Government of California
- Law enforcement in the United States
- List of California fire departments
- List of California state agencies
