= Irvine Police Department =

Police department for the city of Irvine, California

Coordinates: 33°41′10″N 117°49′34″W

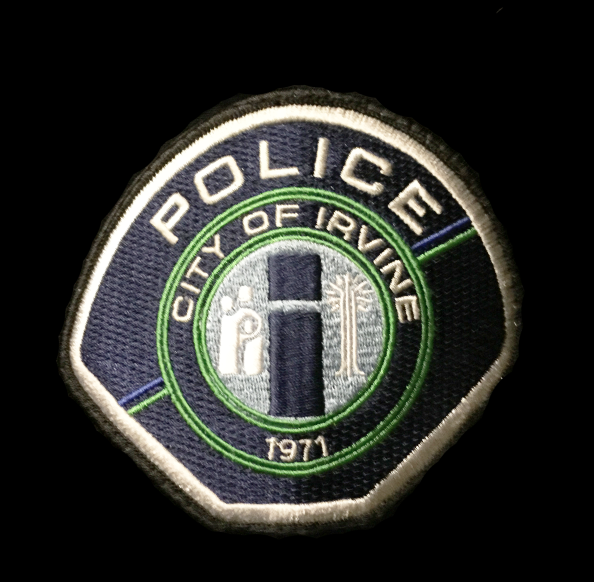
- Patch of Irivine Police Department

Agency overview
- Formed: 1975; 51 years ago
- Employees: 467

Jurisdictional structure
- Operations jurisdiction: Irvine, California, United States
- Map of Irvine Police Department's jurisdiction.
- Area: 66 square miles
- Population: 307,000
- General nature: Local civilian police

Operational structure
- Headquarters: 1 Civic Center Plaza Irvine, CA 92606
- Police officers: 217
- Civilian employees: 94
- Agency executive: Michael Kent, Chief of Police

Website
- www.cityofirvine.org/irvine-police-department

The Irvine Police Department is the local law enforcement agency of the city of Irvine, California, United States. The department's jurisdiction includes the entire city of Irvine, which covers nearly 70 square miles (180 km^{2}) and a population of over 307,000, as well as the Orange County Great Park.

It also supplements the jurisdiction of the University of California, Irvine, Police Department, whose jurisdiction includes the University of California, Irvine campus and surrounding areas of the city.

== History ==
=== Law enforcement in Irvine ===
The earliest organized law enforcement in what is today the city of Irvine, would have dated back to California's entry as a US state in 1850. At this time, the area today known as Orange County was still a part of Los Angeles County. The Los Angeles Sheriff's Department was responsible for law enforcement to all areas of the county at that time. In the mid-19th century, due to the levels of lawlessness in the southern counties of California, the governor created the Los Angeles Rangers, a mounted volunteer cavalry unit that supplemented law enforcement in Southern California. This unit was dissolved by the 1860s.

By 1889, the area today known as Orange County was allowed by the state of California to break away from Los Angeles County. The Irvine Ranch (run first by the Irvine Family, later by the Irvine Company and Irvine Foundation) also had its own Special Deputies (peace officers), authorized by the Orange County Sheriff.

The city of Irvine was originally developed as a master planned community by the Irvine Company, working in conjunction with the state that also built the University of California, Irvine during the early 1960s.

The City of Irvine incorporated in 1971 following a popular vote by the people of the community. For the first year of the city's existence, the city contracted with the Orange County Sheriff's Department to continue law enforcement service to the formerly unincorporated county area, following the Lakewood/ Los Angeles Sheriff's Model from 1954.

In 1972, the city of Irvine changed their contract law enforcement agency to the Costa Mesa Police Department, that provided contract police service until 1975, this time following the Brea Police/Yorba Linda model. During that period, officers from Costa Mesa Police would work the Irvine contract, wearing their Costa Mesa uniforms, but with a patch denoting their assignment to Irvine, under their normal Costa Mesa uniform shoulder patches. These officers used marked Costa Mesa patrol units, albeit with the Irvine city seal in place of the Costa Mesa city seal on the doors.

=== Irvine Police Department ===
The Irvine Police Department was founded in 1975. Much of its original membership came from officers that formerly had worked the Irvine area under the four-year contract with the Costa Mesa Police Department. In July 2017 the department created a mounted unit.

== Rank structure ==
Senior ranks	Insignia
Chief of Police	
Assistant Chief	
Commander	
Lieutenant	
Sergeant	
Corporal/Field Training Officer	

== Chiefs ==
- Leo Peart
- Charles Brobeck
- Michael Berkow
- Dave Maggard
- Mike Hamel
- Michael Kent

== Vehicles ==
Even after breaking away from Costa Mesa, the Irvine Police marked units continued to carry the distinct "all white" paint schemes for their cars, with a set of a green and a blue "racing stripes" running the length of the car on the driver's side, from front to back. Until January 2019, Irvine units were white and had a distinct blue stripe running the length of the car with a city seal at the front and the words "Irvine Police" printed on it. The department switched to the traditional "black and white" units. The new graphics contained the city logo at the front, a thin blue line stretching across the doors, and the words "City of Irvine" above the blue line and "POLICE" below it. The non sworn employee vehicles remained white but received the new graphics.

In October 2024, the Irvine Police Department announced that it had become the first police department in the United States to add a Tesla Cybertruck to its vehicle fleet, which the department purchased for $150,000 to be used primarily for school programs including its anti-drug D.A.R.E. program, with Irvine being one of only two cities in California to participate in the program as of 2024.

== See also ==
- List of law enforcement agencies in California
