= San Marino Police Department =

Police department serving San Marino, California

- Abbreviation: SMPD

Agency overview
- Formed: 1918

Jurisdictional structure
- Operations jurisdiction: San Marino, California, USA
- Area: 3.774 square miles (9.77 km^{2})
- Population: 13,147
- General nature: Local civilian police

Operational structure
- Police Officers: 28
- Civilians: 7
- Agency executive: Police Chief, John Incontro

Website
- ci.san-marino.ca.us/147/Police-Department

The San Marino Police Department (SMPD) is the police department serving the city of San Marino, California. The headquarters of the San Marino Police Department is located at 2200 Huntington Drive, inside of San Marino City Hall. The department employs 25 sworn officers, 7 cadets, and multiple civilian employees. The majority of the police officers are assigned to the operations division which has 22 sworn members, four dispatchers, one parking enforcement officer, two cadets, and one code enforcement officer. The department also has a small detective unit that cooperates with the Sheriff's department crime lab and other agencies to investigate crimes in the city.

== History ==
The San Marino Police Department was founded in 1913 when the city appointed a marshal, Norbert Murray, to handle law enforcement in the city. In the year 1924, Deputy city marshal Ben Parker was appointed as the city's first police chief and at that point the San Marino Police Department was formed.

The department was involved in a major incident when in 1988, a DEA undercover operation went wrong in neighboring Pasadena and two DEA agents were killed and the suspects fled in a car and were chased by police through Pasadena and San Marino until two suspects were killed and one wounded and the suspect's vehicle crashed into a sidewalk on Huntington drive. No San Marino Police officers were injured in the chase.

In 2001, the department encountered a controversy when it fired one of its officers over falsifying a time card by 30 minutes. The controversy was not over the time cards but that by firing the officer his credibility was thrown into question while he was a key witness in a major kidnapping trial.

In late 2011 the department was called to deal with a situation at the home of Tim Sloan, the CFO of Wells Fargo, where 80 to 100 people connected to the occupy movement protested on the lawn of Mr. Sloan's home. The protesters knocked on the door of the home but no one answered and after an hour the police declared it an unlawful assembly and the protesters left peacefully. Several days later the San Marino Police Chief apologized to residents of the area around the home where protesters where after complaints of slow police response and a lack of enforcing trespassing laws.

In July 2014, Police Chief Timothy Harrigan announce that he would retire from the department at the end of 2014 after working in the department for 31 years. On December 15, 2014, John Incontro, former Los Angeles Police Department Captain, took office as San Marino's Chief of Police.

== See also ==
- List of law enforcement agencies in California
- Pasadena Police Department (California)
- Law enforcement in Los Angeles County
