= Ridgecrest Police Department =

Law enforcement agency in California

- Patch of Ridgecrest Police Department

- Badge of Ridgecrest Police Department
- Abbreviation: RPD

Agency overview
- Formed: 1962; 64 years ago

Jurisdictional structure
- Operations jurisdiction: Ridgecrest, California, US
- Map of Ridgecrest Police Department's jurisdiction
- Area: 21.417 miles (34.467 km)
- Population: 27,616 (2010)
- Legal jurisdiction: As per operations jurisdiction

Operational structure
- Headquarters: 100 West California Avenue; Ridgecrest, California
- Agency executive: Chief of Police, Mario Ysit

Website
- ridgecrest.ca.us/police-department

The Ridgecrest Police Department is the agency responsible for law enforcement within the City of Ridgecrest, California. The headquarters is located at 100 West California Avenue. The city uses a nearby jail maintained by the Kern County Sheriff's Department.

== See also ==
- List of law enforcement agencies in California
