= Speeders (TV program) =

American reality television series (2006–2009)

- Title card
- Country of origin: United States
- No. of seasons: 3
- No. of episodes: 114

Production
- Running time: 22 minutes
- Production company: ZOO Productions

Original release
- Network: truTV (formerly CourtTV)
- Release: October 23, 2006 – April 9, 2009

Related
- Speeders Fight Back

Speeders is an American traffic crime reality television program that was broadcast on truTV (then known as Court TV at the time of this show's debut). The program debuted in the mid-2007, and aired through 2009.

Unlike the more action-packed and felony-oriented show COPS, this program consists of clips of individuals being pulled over for minor offenses, most commonly speeding, as well as other things such as seat belt and other equipment violations, and is more comedy-oriented. The entertainment is derived from the interaction between the offender and the police officers. More specifically, the excuses that offenders give for why they allegedly committed the violation. To wrap up most episodes, a "Classic Clip" is shown, where they show a police dashcam video about a routine stop. These videos originate from the 90's and were filmed by various police departments.

== Departments featured ==
- Abington Police Department
- Washington State Patrol
- Florida Highway Patrol
- California Highway Patrol
- Long Beach Police Department
- Oak Lawn Police Department
- Redondo Beach Police Department
- Laguna Beach Police Department
- Akron Police Department
- Belmar Police Department
- Travis County Sheriffs Office
- Peabody Police Department
- Brick Township Police Department
- Rutland Police Department
- Burbank Police Department
- Los Angeles Police Department
- Azusa Police Department
- Orange County, California Sheriff's Department
- Rialto Police Department
- Glendale Police Department
- Oxnard Police Department
- Markham Police Department
- Calvert County Sheriff's Office
- Portsmouth Police Department
- Concord Police Department
- Toms River Police Department
- Alexandria Police Department
- Ithaca Police Department
- Beverly Hills Police Department
- Bay County Sheriffs Office
- Chattanooga Police Department
- Ann Arbor Police Department
- Greensboro Police Department
- Plantation Police Department
- Milwaukee Police Department
- St.Tammany Parish Sheriffs Office
- Topeka Police Department
- Alpharetta Police Department

== International broadcast ==
In the United Kingdom, it was shown on Dave. In Latin America, it aired on truTV Latin America. It aired on Action in Canada. In Spain the program was broadcast on Energy, and in Finland on Jim.

== See also ==
- Speeders Fight Back, a spin-off nontraditional court show of Speeders where the offending motorists take their cases to court
