= Pasadena Police Department =

Pasadena Police Department may refer to:

- Pasadena Police Department (California)
- Pasadena Police Department (Texas)
