= Tulare Police Department (California) =

Police department for the city of Tulare, California

- Common name: Tulare Police

Jurisdictional structure
- Operations jurisdiction: Tulare, California, U.S.
- Legal jurisdiction: Tulare, California
- General nature: Local civilian police

Operational structure
- Headquarters: 260 South M Street Tulare, California 93274
- Agency executive: Fred Ynclan, Chief of Police

Website
- Tulare Police Department Official Website

The Tulare Police Department is the police department serving Tulare, California. As of May 14th, 2025, the chief of police is Fred Ynclan.

== Overview ==
=== Divisions/Units ===
- Patrol Division
- Investigation Division
- Administrative Division
- Animal Services

== Fallen officers ==
Since the establishment of the Tulare Police Department, three police officers and one police dog have died while on duty.

== See also ==
- Law enforcement in California
- List of law enforcement agencies in California
