= Delano Police Department =

Police department serving Delano, California

- Patch of Delano Police Department
- Abbreviation: DPD

Agency overview
- Formed: 1913; 113 years ago
- Employees: 85
- Annual budget: $8.0 million (2011)

Jurisdictional structure
- Operations jurisdiction: Delano, California, US
- Map of Delano Police Department's jurisdiction
- Area: 14.355 miles (23.102 km)
- Population: 53,041 (2010)
- Legal jurisdiction: As per operations jurisdiction

Operational structure
- Headquarters: 2330 High Street Street; Delano, California
- Agency executive: Chief of Police, COP Jerry Nicholson
- Units: 7: Investigations Division; K-9 Unit; Gang Unit; Patrol Division; Public Safety Dispatch; SRO Program; Traffic Division

Website
- cityofdelano.org/police

The Delano Police Department is the agency responsible for law enforcement within the City of Delano, California. The department is divided into three divisions; Administrative Division, Patrol Division, and Investigations Division. It contains approximately 80 employees, which consists of California Sworn Peace Officers and civilian employees. The Delano Police Department headquarters is located at 2330 High Street Delano, CA 93215 Kern County.

== See also ==
- List of law enforcement agencies in California
