= California State Parks Peace Officer =

Law enforcement agency in California, United States

California State Park Peace Officers

- Common name: California State Parks Law Enforcement
- Abbreviation: SPPO
- Motto: "Standing tall, we answer the call."

Agency overview
- Formed: 1927

Jurisdictional structure
- Operations jurisdiction: California, USA
- Map of California State Park Peace Officers's jurisdiction
- General nature: Civilian police

Operational structure
- Headquarters: Sacramento, California
- Sworn members: ~500 (in 2026)
- Parent agency: California State Parks

Website
- California Park Peace Officer Website

California State Park Peace Officers are state law enforcement officers who operate within the parks, beaches, and facilities managed by the California Department of Parks and Recreation. State Park Peace Officers perform a wide variety of general law-enforcement activities such as criminal investigation and traffic enforcement; as well as participating in statewide task forces regarding narcotics enforcement, auto theft, and fish and wildlife crimes on California State Parks property. Officers are uniformed as either park rangers or lifeguards dependant on their area of operation and responsibilities, but both work in conjunction to enforce state law and park regulations in the 280 parks and beaches in the state. Non law-enforcement duties include aquatic rescue (by lifeguards and other certified officers), search and rescue, emergency medical response, interpretation of natural, historic and cultural resources, resource protection, and general park management.

Officers patrol park grounds by vehicle, boat, and foot or horse patrol; enforce park regulations and issue citations; write reports; make physical arrests for misdemeanors, felonies, and warrants; conduct criminal and administrative investigations; take command in emergencies; perform search and rescue activities; assist in wildland and structural fire suppression; provide emergency medical assistance and aid; and may also perform traffic control and radio dispatching. Incumbents may perform specialized assignments in cliff rescue; ski patrol; scuba diving; ocean, surf, river, and lake rescue; horse patrol; patrol by aircraft; off-road vehicle and motorcycle patrol; or as a canine team handler.

== Functions ==
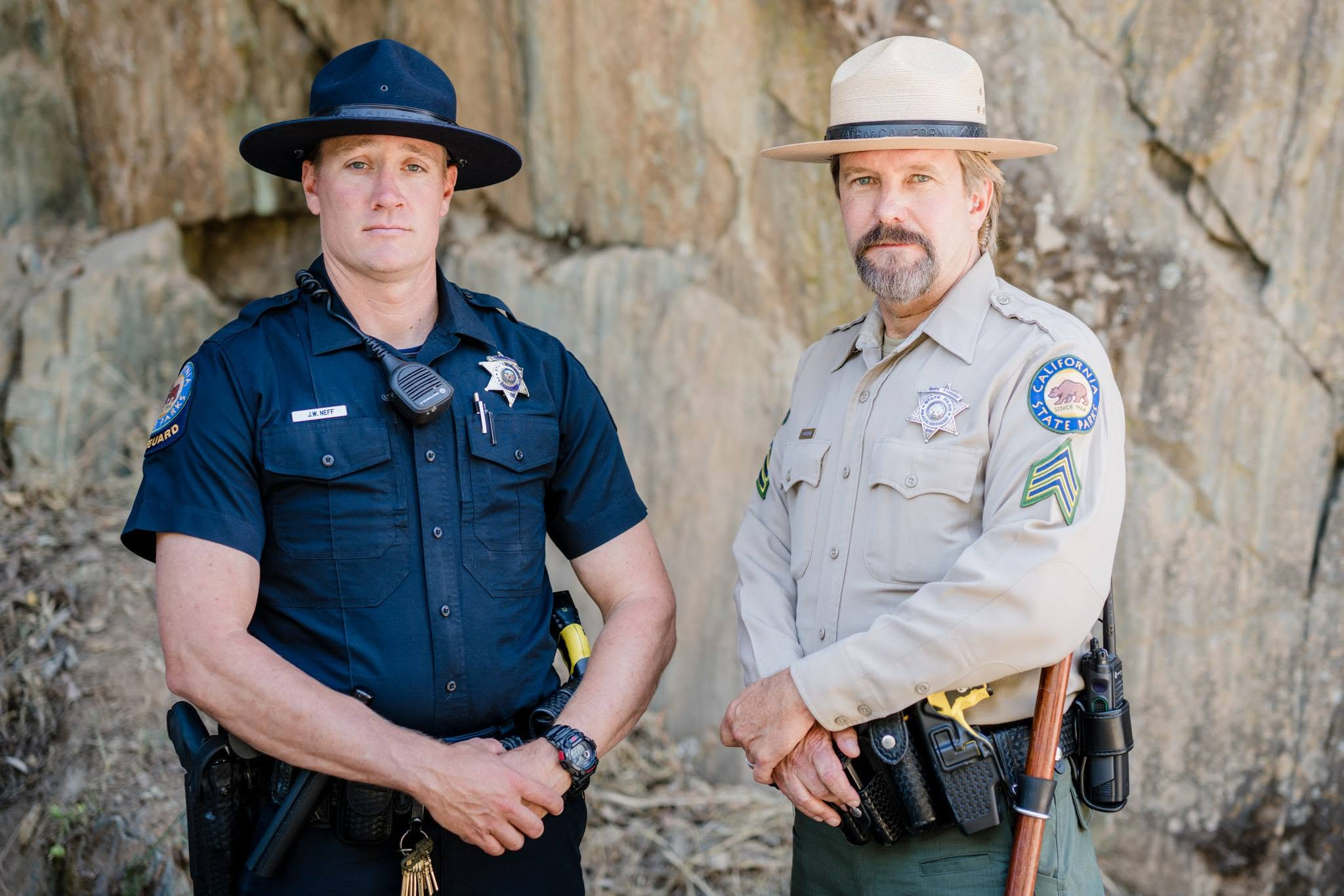
Two SPPOs: a Lifeguard (left) and a Ranger (right).

Public safety

- Law-enforcement services
- Lifeguard services
- Medical aid/emergency medical response
- Operating and maintaining emergency equipment

Visitor assistance

- Advising visitors of rules and regulations
- Providing general park information

Public education and interpretation

- Community outreach
- Interpretive programs
- Junior Ranger and Lifeguard Programs

Park Resource Protection and Management

== Rank structure ==
| Rank description | | Insignia |
| Ranger | Lifeguard | Insignia |
|---|---|---|
| Director | | |
| Chief Deputy Director Deputy Director, Park Operations | | |
| Deputy Director | | |
| Division Chief | | |
| Superintendent IV/ Superintendent V (District Superintendent) | | |
| Superintendent III (Chief Ranger) | Superintendent III (Sector Superintendent) | |
| Superintendent II (Captain) | | |
| Superintendent I (Lieutenant) | SPPO Lifeguard Supervisor II (Lifeguard Lieutenant) | |
| Supervisor (Sergeant) | | |
| Limited Term Supervisor / LT Sergeant | | |
| State Park Peace Officer - Ranger | State Park Peace Officer - Lifeguard | No Insignia |
| Cadet | | No Insignia |

== Equipment ==
Ford Expedition in SPPO livery

The current sidearm of the State Park Peace Officers is the Smith & Wesson M&P, the current patrol rifle is the Colt AR-15 Model LE6920, and the current patrol shotgun is the Remington Model 870 Police Magnum.

== Training ==
All State Park Peace Officers must complete a Peace Officer Standards and Training (P.O.S.T.) academy before being sworn in as a Ranger or a Lifeguard. California State Parks hosts a P.O.S.T. academy specifically for S.P.P.O.s at the Butte College in Oroville, CA. The Ranger academy requires 6 to 8 months to complete, depending on the class. Each class consists of up to 50 cadets, both lifeguard and ranger.

=== Difference in Training at the Academy ===
Lifeguards and rangers attend the same CA POST Peace Officer Academy. Lifeguards receive all the training as rangers. Lifeguards are also required to train in and complete the additional 8-day CA State Parks Lifeguard seasonal training either before or within one year after the completion of the POST Peace Officer Academy. During the POST Academy, lifeguards wear the blue uniform and rangers wear the tan and green.

=== Training After the Academy ===
S.P.P.O.s continue training regularly upon graduation from the academy and are encouraged to further their knowledge and skill base to best serve the parks and people of California. Some training includes EMT training, K-9 Handler training, counter-terrorism training, and firearms training.

== See also ==
- List of law enforcement agencies in California
