= Palm Springs Police Department =

Police department serving Palm Springs, CA

- Abbreviation: PSPD

Agency overview
- Annual budget: $42.7 million

Jurisdictional structure
- Operations jurisdiction: Palm Springs, California, California, U.S.
- Population: 50,000
- Governing body: Mayor Palm Springs
- General nature: Local civilian police

Operational structure
- Headquarters: Palm Springs, California
- Agency executive: Kyle Stjerne, Chief of Police
- Divisions: 19: Police Explorers; Aero Squadron; Dispatch; Crime Lab; K-9 Unit; S.W.A.T.; Citizens on Patrol; Police Advisory Board; Subpoena Office; Animal Control; Mounted Enforcement Unit; Records; Bicycle Patrol; Honor Guard; Police Reserves; Search and Rescue; Traffic Bureau; Airport Detail; Detective Bureau

Facilities
- Stations: 1

Website
- www.palmspringsca.gov/government/departments/police

The Palm Springs Police Department (PSPD) is the agency responsible for law enforcement within the city of Palm Springs, California and of the Agua Caliente Indian Reservation, United States, via contract. The headquarters is located at 200 South Civic Drive.

The mission of the department is "The men and women of the Palm Springs Police Department, empowered by and in partnership with the community, are dedicated to providing professional, ethical, and courteous service to all."

On October 8, 2016, two police officers, Jose "Gil" Vega and Lesley Zerebny, were shot and killed in the line of duty, the first since 1962. In 2017, a section of California State Route 111 was designated the "Officer Jose 'Gil' Vega and Officer Lesley Zerebny Memorial Highway" in their honor.

== See also ==
- List of law enforcement agencies in California
