= Los Angeles Park Ranger Division =

City of Los Angeles Park Ranger Division
- Common name: LA Park Rangers

Jurisdictional structure
- Operations jurisdiction: Los Angeles, California, US

Website
- Official website

The City of Los Angeles Park Ranger Division, LA Park Rangers or L.A. Park Rangers, is a park ranger division serving city parks in Los Angeles, California. The headquarters of the LA Park Rangers is located at the Griffith Park visitor center. The division is a specialized agency controlled by the Department of Parks and Recreation and employs Park Rangers who are sworn peace officers under 830.31 of the California Penal Code.

== Overview ==
The City of Los Angeles Park Rangers provide public assistance and emergency services in city parks, including first aid, law enforcement, search and rescue, and wildland firefighting. They have various responsibilities in public parks and provide not only emergency and public safety services but also informational services at several parks. All Park Rangers are required to obtain a Basic P.O.S.T certificate to remain employed. Park Rangers attend the Los Angeles Police Department's academy. The Ranger Division is a participating agency in P.O.S.T. which sets the training standards for peace officers.

=== Firearms ===
In 1996 due to spikes in violent crime in city parks patrolled by the Rangers, the union representing the rangers requested that the Rangers be trained to carry semi-automatic handguns similar to the police. Still, the request was eventually denied due to opposition from the LAPD and the Parks Department.

=== Arrest powers change proposal ===
In 2000 the Parks and Recreation Department and the LAPD attempted to change the duties of the Park rangers by signing an agreement that would make the LAPD responsible for all arrests made in city parks and that Rangers would only be allowed to make arrests if someone's life was in danger. After strong opposition from the Park rangers, the city council eventually rejected the proposed agreement and Park rangers continued with their original peace officer status.

=== Uniform ===
Park Rangers wear gray uniform shirts and forest green pants, with a gold-colored metal oval shield badge. Security Officers assigned to the Park Ranger division wear similar shirts with dark brown pants. They are issued a gold-colored metal "pinched shield" eagle-top badge, a design many other city departments use. Both classifications wear straw campaign hat-style ranger hats.

== See also ==
- List of law enforcement agencies in California
- Los Angeles Police Department
- Law enforcement in Los Angeles County
