= Simi Valley Police Department =

Police department in Simi Valley, California, US

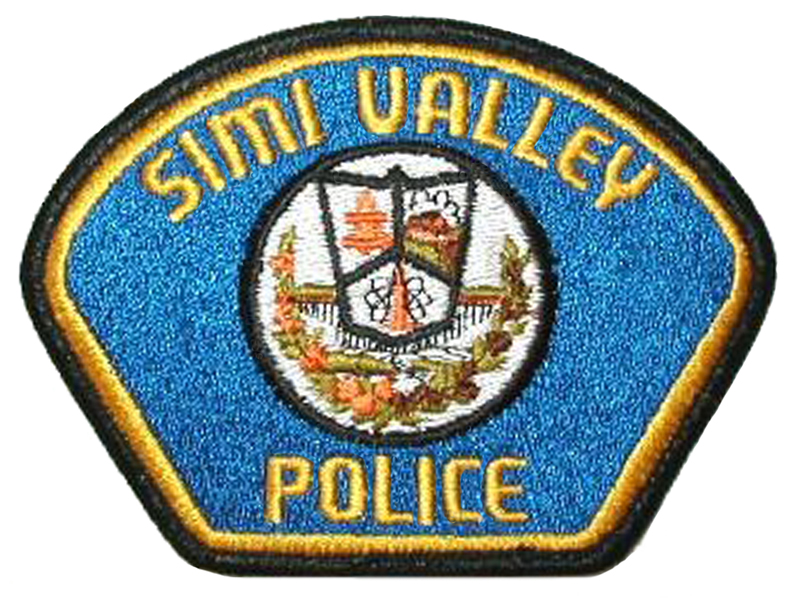
- Simi Valley Police Department patch

Agency overview
- Formed: 1971

Jurisdictional structure
- Operations jurisdiction: Simi Valley, California, United States
- General nature: Civilian police

Operational structure
- Officers: 131
- Unsworn members: 65
- Agency executive: Steve Shorts, Chief of Police

Facilities
- Stations: 1

The Simi Valley Police Department (SVPD) is the police department of the city of Simi Valley, California. The department has 131 sworn officers and more than 65 support personnel. Its patrol area covers more than 47 square miles.

== History ==
The police department was founded in 1971, shortly after the incorporation of Simi Valley in 1969. Its original name was Simi Valley Community Safety Agency. Initially funded by a federal grant, the department was a non-traditional police department. Officers wore blazers instead of traditional uniforms and the rank structure was unlike tradition police departments. There were no detectives; instead officers investigated their own cases. As the city and department grew, it became very difficult for officers to both serve as patrol officers and to investigate the cases that they generated. It was also recognized that for certain crimes certain expertise was necessary and not all officers had the necessary expertise. This recognition resulted in the establishment of the Major Investigations Unit (MIU). This was the forerunner to the current Investigative Division.

Simi Valley PD was engaged in Community Policing before the term was popular. The Police Foundation viewed the Simi Valley experiment as the first attempt at Community Oriented Policing, although it was not called that at that time.

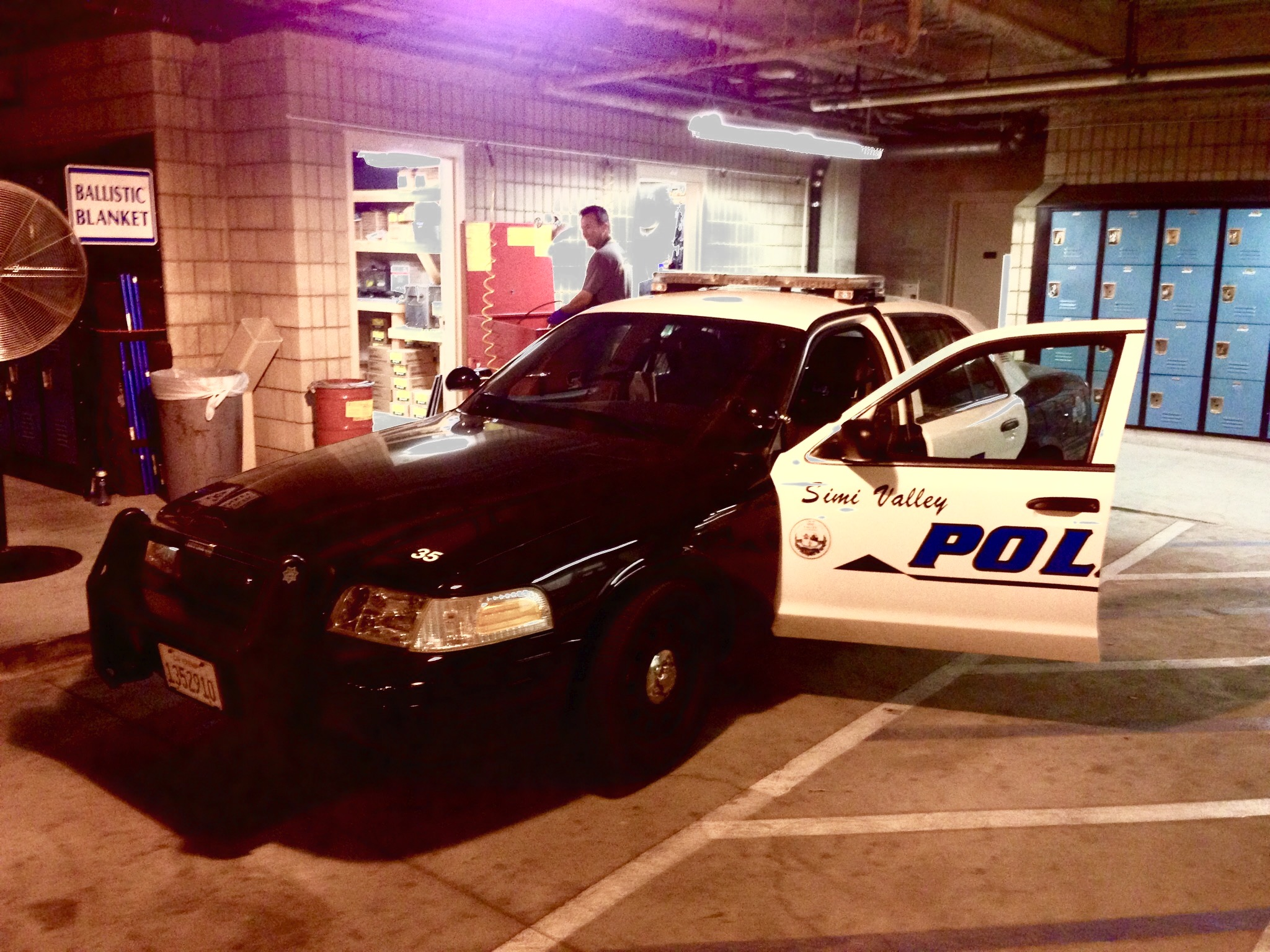
Police cruiser at the Simi Valley Police Department, 2012.

The Chief of Police, who is appointed by the Simi Valley city manager, is charged with overseeing all law enforcement operations within the city limits. The department is divided into several divisions, with the Operations Division being the most visible to the public.

=== Operations Division ===
This division oversees the Patrol, Traffic, and Dispatch units. The Patrol Unit includes the Canine Program, Field Training Program, and Reserve Officer Program.

=== Investigative Division ===
This division oversees the Special Operations Unit, the Detective Unit, and the Criminal Intelligence Section. The Special Operations Unit includes the department's Gang Task Force. The Simi Valley Police SWAT team, composed of officers from across the department, is considered a part-time team, or an ancillary duty to an officer's primary assignment.

== Fallen officers ==
Since the establishment of the Simi Valley Police Department, one officer has died while on duty.

== See also ==
- List of law enforcement agencies in California
