= Selma Police Department (California) =

Police department serving Selma, California

- Motto: Providing Quality Service with Pride and Commitment

Agency overview
- Formed: 1893

Jurisdictional structure
- Legal jurisdiction: Municipal/Regional

Operational structure
- Sworn members: 30
- Unsworn members: 8
- Agency executive: Rudy Alcaraz, Chief of Police

Website
- Official website

The Selma Police Department is responsible for policing the incorporated city of Selma in Fresno County, California, in the United States. The department's current police chief, Rudy Alcaraz, was appointed to the position in 2022, succeeding Joseph Gomez.

== Assignments ==
- Sworn Assignments
  - Administration
  - Patrol
  - K-9 Unit
  - Traffic
  - Field Training
  - Special Problem Oriented Teams
  - Investigations
- Non-sworn Assignments
  - Communications Unit
  - Property & Evidence
  - Volunteers

=== K9 Unit ===
There are 2 handlers, as well as the supervising sergeant, and 2 dogs. They also sometimes assist allied agencies.

=== Traffic Services ===
There are 2 officers on the traffic enforcement team. The unit's specialty is in reducing collisions. Strategies include Driving Under the Influence (DUI) /Driver's License safety checkpoints and DUI roving patrols. The unit also produces a "hot sheet" to notify patrol officers to be on the lookout for identified repeat DUI offenders or those with suspended or revoked licenses as a result of previous DUI convictions. Court sting operations have been performed successfully which focus on DUI offenders with suspended or revoked licenses who continue to get behind the wheel of a vehicle.

Traffic enforcement efforts have been effective enough that red-light collisions have decreased by 75%.

=== Investigations Unit ===
Selma PD's Investigations unit is composed of two full-time Detectives. At the completion of the investigation a case gets forwarded to the Fresno County District Attorney's Office for review and prosecution.

=== Communications Unit ===
There are 4 public safety dispatchers working for the city of Selma, stationed at the police station, who take all 911 calls in the city. They are rotated to work in the communications center 24 hours a day, 7 days a week.

=== Property & Evidence ===
The Property & Evidence Unit is responsible for handling and storing evidence and property from crime scenes. The hours of operation are Monday through Friday from 9:00 AM to 12:00 PM and 1:00 PM to 4:00 PM. They are closed on major holidays.

== Academy and training ==
Officers for the city of Selma receive their training at the police academy at Fresno City College

== See also ==
- List of law enforcement agencies in California
- Selma, CA
