= Arcadia Police Department =

Police department for the city of Arcadia, California

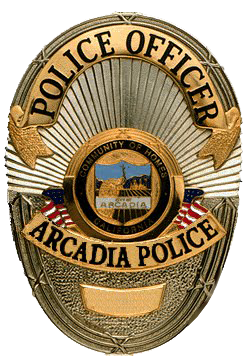
- Arcadia Police badge

Agency overview
- Formed: 1903

Jurisdictional structure
- Operations jurisdiction: Arcadia, California, USA
- Area: 11.1 square miles (29 km^{2})
- Population: 56,364
- General nature: Local civilian police

Operational structure
- Police Officers: 68
- Civilians: 35
- Agency executive: Police Chief, Roy Nakamura

Website
- Arcadia Police Department

The Arcadia Police Department is the police department serving Arcadia, California. The headquarters of the Arcadia Police Department is located at 250 West Huntington Drive, adjacent to Arcadia City Hall. It is across the street from the Santa Anita Race Track and Arcadia County Park. The department employs 68 sworn officers, 10 reserve officers, and 35 civilian employees. The police chief is Roy Nakamura who was appointed on January 9, 2021.

== Overview ==
The Arcadia Police Department was founded in 1903 when residents of Arcadia voted to incorporate the city and a city marshal was appointed to oversee law enforcement. In the year 1926, the city marshal's office was transitioned into a Police Department. Currently the department patrols some notable events, such as the Santa Anita Derby, along with the Santa Anita Race Track and the Westfield Santa Anita Mall.

The department primarily uses the Los Angeles County Sheriff's academy for academy training. The department also maintains an explorer program with 16 explorers. Police officers work on a "3-16" schedule and respond to all emergency calls in an average time of 3 minutes or less. Since the establishment of the Arcadia Police Department, one officer, Albert E. Matthies, has died in the line of duty. Officer Matthies died on July 19, 1927, when he pulled over a car with three men inside. Without warning one of the men in the backseat shot and killed Officer Matthies who died instantly. The three men were later on captured and convicted of his murder.

=== Detective Bureau ===
The Arcadia Police Department also maintains a detective bureau made up of 12 Detective, Supervised by one Sergeant, and commanded by a Lieutenant. The bureau is divided into different areas of responsibility: Crimes Against Persons including Sex Crimes, Property Crime, Fraud Crimes, Tech Crimes, Crimes Against Property, Major Accident Investigation Team, Crime Analysis Unit, and a Gang, Narcotics, and Vice area. Detective's from different areas have been involved in different key investigations such as when Detectives responsible for Narcotics raided a home in Arcadia and seized 150 Marijuana plants and arrested and charged three individuals. Detectives have also investigated election violations in municipal elections such as in the year 2014 when they investigated City Councilman Sho Tay's election activities of allegedly collecting and mailing ballots. The detective bureau worked alongside the rest of the Arcadia Police in September 2013 to investigate threats to Arcadia High School that a "man with a gun" was on campus. The threats turned out to be a hoax but the campus was still locked down and Arcadia Police SWAT were deployed to evacuate students. After joint cooperation between the Arcadia, Monrovia, and Covina police departments along with the LA County Sheriff's Department and the FBI, a suspect was arrested and charged with five felony counts of making criminal threats and five counts of false report of an emergency.

== See also ==
- List of law enforcement agencies in California
- Pasadena Police Department (California)
- Law enforcement in Los Angeles County
