= Los Gatos/Monte Sereno Police Department =

Law enforcement agency in California, United States

The Los Gatos/Monte Sereno Police Department serves the cities of Los Gatos and Monte Sereno, located in Santa Clara County, California. The department is made up of 64 sworn officers and regular employees. The department is a full service organization. The department works with several other law enforcement agencies including the California Highway Patrol, Campbell Police Department, San Jose Police Department, and Santa Clara County Sheriff's Office. The cities of Los Gatos and Monte Sereno have very low crime rates, and the citizens directly support the department and its community programs through the Los Gatos/Monte Sereno Police Foundation. The current police chief for the Los Gatos/Monte Sereno police department is Peter Decena.

== Bureaus/Divisions ==
- Patrol Division
- Detective/Investigations Bureau
- Records and Communications Bureau
- Evidence Division
- Traffic and Motorcycle Unit

These are special divisions, to which an officer may only be assigned one, and are made up of staff of the Los Gatos/Monte Santo Police Department.

=== Patrol Division ===
The Patrol Division is made up of 4 Teams (A Team, B Team, Watch 1, Watch 2) with each team being composed of a sergeant, a corporal, and officers.

=== Detective/Investigations Bureau ===
The Investigations Bureau is composed of one sergeant, five detectives, one Investigations Specialist, and one School Resource officer. The sergeant acts as the detective sergeant and reviews all cases brought by patrol officers before they become cases worthy of investigation by detectives. One detective is a dedicated juvenile detective and works with cases involving youth. The investigative specialist acts as a court liaison, provides general support to the Detective Bureau and manages the sex and narcotics registrants. Court liaison duties include obtaining warrants, delivering cases to the District Attorney’s Office for review, and facilitating subpoena service. Managing registrants consists of completing required paperwork, intake interviews, and monitoring offenders for compliance. The School Resource Officer acts as a detective, but also deals with public schools in the area.

=== Records and Communications Bureau ===
The Records and Communications Bureau hands all paperwork related to the Los Gatos/Monte Sereno Police Department and also operates the dispatch office.

=== Evidence Division ===
The Evidence Division is made up of evidence technicians who handle all property and evidence that comes into the police department.

=== Traffic and Motorcycle Unit ===
The Traffic and Motorcycle Unit is involved in traffic enforcement and highway patrol.

== Teams/Programs ==
- Crime Scene Investigation Team
- School Resources and D.A.R.E.
- Canine Team
- Crisis Resolution Unit
- Bicycle Patrol Team
- SWAT/Hostage Negotiations
- Personnel and Community Services Program

All patrol officers have basic duties, however each are encouraged to join teams in order to specialize themselves and better serve the community.

=== Crime Scene Investigation Team ===
The Crime Scene Investigation Team (or CSI Team) appears at all crime scenes and other major events. Each member takes a two-week basic crime scene class, but may also take other classes to specialize in other skills, such as blood splatter analysis.

=== School Resources and D.A.R.E. ===
The School Resources and D.A.R.E. program is an extension of the nationwide D.A.R.E program that reaches out to schools in across the United States. The program and the school resources division reaches students in schools in Los Gatos and in Monte Santo.

=== Canine Unit ===
The Canine Team is made up of one dog, Berko, and a handler. Berk was trained in the Czech Republic for narcotics detection and search and rescue. This team also acts as a public liaison and visiting schools and other locations to speak on behalf of the police department.

=== Crisis Resolution Team ===
The Crisis Resolution Team trains CIT officers. CIT officers must be sent to calls involving individuals who are displaying emotional problems brought on by traumatic issues in their lives or induced by various states of alcohol and/or drug use. Over 80% of sworn officers and dispatchers in the Los Gatos/Monte Santo have received specialized training in this subject. Joint with the Campbell Police Department, The LGMSPD provides 10 officers and 2 sergeants.

=== Bicycle Patrol Team ===
The Bike Team allows for increased mobility along the many trails and paths in Los Gatos and Monte Sereno. The bike team is also responds to situations quickly during a special event or when downtown traffic is heavy. Officers on the bike team qualify by passing an 40-hour training course.

=== SWAT/Hostage Negotiations ===
Los Gatos/Monte Sereno Police Department and Campbell Police Department have a combined SWAT Team. The mission is the safe resolution of any critical incident. The primary role of this team is highly skilled support and to provide a specialized skill set in any situation where the capabilities of the team are necessary to conduct tactical operations in a high-risk environment. SWAT missions may include high-risk search and arrest warrant service, barricaded suspect searches, hostage rescue, and protective details.

=== Personnel and Community Services Program ===
The Personnel and Community Services Program(or the PCS Program) is a program for the promotion of support of state and federal mandates and for the creation of a more transparent police department.
