= Fusus (company) =

American surveillance technology company

- Founded: 2019
- Parent: Axon Enterprise

Fusus, branded as Axon Fusus, is an American technology company focused on crime mapping and surveillance technology for law enforcement. Fusus allows for law enforcement to request access to live or recorded surveillance footage from cameras owned by private businesses.

In February 2024, security technology company Axon Enterprise announced it had acquired Fusus.

== History ==
=== Atlanta police investigation ===
In July 2025, Atlanta's office of ethics published an investigation alleging Marshall Freeman, the chief administrative officer for the Atlanta Police Department, had held an equity stake and served as a consultant for Fusus while also negotiating the city's usage of its software.

=== Last Week Tonight investigation ===
In August 2026, Last Week Tonight with John Oliver published a segment on police surveillance, including the use of Fusus by the town of Rialto, California. Oliver claimed that Rialto requires businesses to allow the Rialto Police Department access to security footage, and that the company was developing tools for police to livestream footage from private homeowner's Ring cameras. Ring subsequently claimed no livestream tour was in development.
