= Rialto Police Department =

Law enforcement agency for the city of Rialto, CA

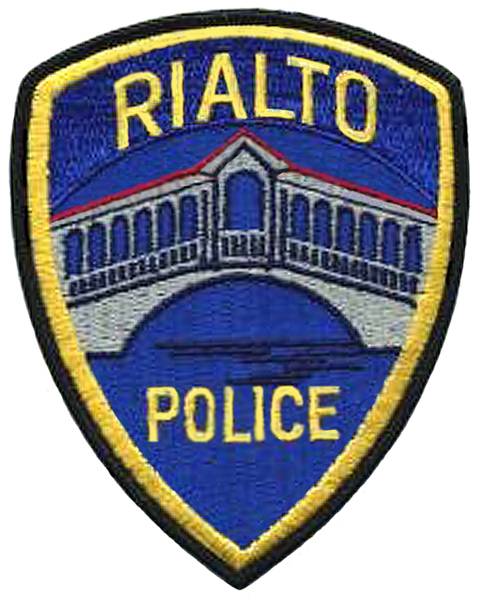
- Abbreviation: RPD

Agency overview
- Formed: November 17, 1911
- Employees: 221

Jurisdictional structure
- Operations jurisdiction: Rialto, California, USA
- Area: 28 square miles (73 km^{2})
- Population: 107,910 (2013)
- General nature: Local civilian police

Operational structure
- Headquarters: Rialto, California
- Police Officers: 140
- Civilians: 81
- Agency executive: Mark Kling, Chief

Website
- Rialto PD Website

The Rialto Police Department is the primary law enforcement agency in Rialto, in San Bernardino County, California. It offers services including patrol, K-9 unit and school resource officers. It was founded on November 17, 1911.

== Controversies ==
In 2005, police chief Michael Meyers resigned after members of the police union had taken a vote of no-confidence in him and his deputy, Arthur Burgess.

The department was almost disbanded in early 2007 when the San Bernardino County Sheriff's Department was asked to provide a contract for police services.

In 2010, an employee of the Spearmint Rhino gentlemen's club filed a claim for $500,000 against the city of Rialto alleging that Rialto police officers had, while on-duty and off-duty, engaged in sexual relations with strip club employees at the Rialto Police Union hall. The suit alleged that at times group sex between Rialto cops and Spearmint Rhino employees occurred at the union hall. The plaintiff alleged that she was physically and verbally harassed by a former Rialto police officer when she learned that he had impregnated her. Two officers resigned from the department in the wake of the scandal

In 2011, Rialto police shot and killed a man who had been charging them with a brick. Also in 2011, a Rialto policeman was indicted on federal bribery charges for accepting a $2500 bribe. He was charged along with an Orange County lawyer for falsely claiming that a witness had "provided substantial assistance" to the DEA.

In May 2012, a police officer was charged for engaging in sex with an underage female.

In August 2026, Last Week Tonight with John Oliver aired a segment on the department's usage of Fusus, a company that allows law enforcement to access security cameras of private businesses. Oliver claimed that the city of Rialto required businesses to give the department access to their security footage.

== See also ==
- List of law enforcement agencies in California
