= Costa Mesa Police Department =

Police agency for Costa Mesa, California

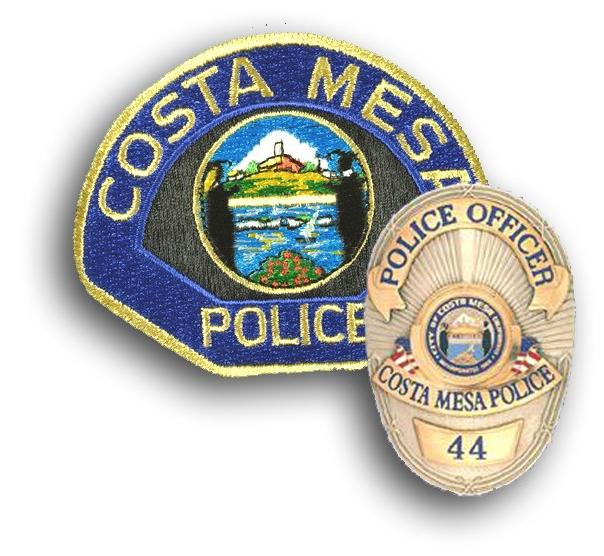
- Badge and uniform patch of the Costa Mesa Police Department
- Abbreviation: CMPD
- Motto: "Honored to Serve"

Agency overview
- Formed: 1953; 73 years ago
- Employees: 196
- Volunteers: 8
- Annual budget: $40.25 million

Jurisdictional structure
- Operations jurisdiction: Costa Mesa, California, United States
- Costa Mesa, CA
- Area: 15.70 sq mi (40.7 km^{2})
- Population: 110,000
- Governing body: Costa Mesa City Council
- General nature: Local civilian police

Operational structure
- Headquarters: 99 Fair Drive
- Officers: 130
- Unsworn members: 66
- Agency executive: Joyce LaPointe, Chief of Police

Facilities
- Stations: 2
- Jails: 1
- Helicopters: 1 (contracted from and shared with the Huntington Beach Police Department)

Website
- Costa Mesa Police Department

The Costa Mesa Police Department (CMPD) is the police department of the city of Costa Mesa, California.The department is authorized 130 sworn officers plus additional civilian support staff.

== Organization ==
The CMPD is authorized 147 officers plus civilian support staff. The sworn personnel are represented by the Costa Mesa Police Officer Association.

The department divides the city into Area 1 and Area 2 (subdivided into two patrol beats each), both areas being commanded by an officer in the rank of lieutenant.

The Support Services includes the Detective Bureau, Helicopter Bureau, Traffic Safety Bureau and the Communications Division. Technical Services include the jail, Property and Evidence Bureau, Records Bureau, and a Training and Recruitment Bureau.

The CMPD also operates a SWAT team, a motorcycle unit, and an animal control service.

== History ==
On December 16, 1953, the first officer of the Costa Mesa Police department “hit the streets”

On March 10, 1987 a helicopter from the CMPD collided with another helicopter operated by the Newport Beach Police Department. The two crewmen in the CMPD aircraft were killed, while the other aircraft was able to land safely.

As a result of the Great Recession, the 2011 budget for Costa Mesa included cuts to the CMPD. Items cut included a police helicopter program characterized as a "luxury" by the mayor. Police chief Staveley resigned in protest, claiming that the budget crisis was a fiction created by City Hall for political purposes.

In January 2023, the department launched an internal investigation after a man uploaded a Tik Tok video that allegedly shows an officer using a racial slur during a traffic stop.

== See also ==
- List of law enforcement agencies in California
