= Kern County Sheriff's Office =

Law enforcement agency in California, US

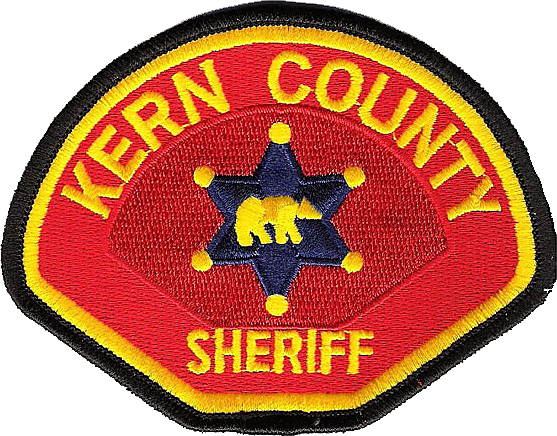
- Patch of the Kern County Sheriff's Office

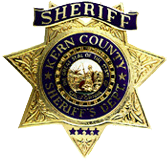
- Badge of the Kern County Sheriff
- Abbreviation: KCSO

Agency overview
- Formed: 1866; 160 years ago
- Employees: 1,449
- Annual budget: $308 million (2023)

Jurisdictional structure
- Operations jurisdiction: Kern County, California, USA
- Map of Kern County Sheriff's Office's jurisdiction
- Area: 8,161 miles (13,134 km)
- Population: 839,631 (2010)
- Legal jurisdiction: As per operations jurisdiction

Operational structure
- Headquarters: 1350 Norris Road; Bakersfield, California
- Deputies: 640 (Deputy Sheriff); 360 (Detention Deputy)
- Support Staffs: 331
- Agency executive: Sheriff / Coroner / Public Administrator, Donny Youngblood (R)
- Units: 6: Air Support; Bomb Squad; Detention; Detective; Metro Patrol; Special Enforcement; S.W.A.T.
- Regions: 4: 1 – North; 2 – East; 3 – South; 4 – West

Facilities
- Substations: 15: Boron; Buttonwillow; Delano; Frazier Park; Glennville; Kern Valley; Lamont; Mojave; Ridgecrest; Rosamond; Rosedale; Taft; Tehachapi; Walker Basin; Wasco
- Airbases: 1: Meadows Field
- Detentions: 4: Central Receiving Facility; Lerdo Detention Facility; Mojave Jail; Ridgecrest Jail

Website
- https://www.kernsheriff.org/

The Kern County Sheriff's Office is the agency responsible for law enforcement within Kern County, California, in the United States. The agency provides: law enforcement within the county, maintain the jails used by both the county and municipalities, and provides search and rescue. Its jurisdiction contains all of the unincorporated areas of the county, approximately 8,000 square miles (21,000 km^{2}). The headquarters is in Bakersfield with 15 substations located throughout the county. The metro patrol area is divided into four regions: north, south, east, and west. The Sheriff's Office has over 1,200 sworn officers and civilian employees.

== Station and substations ==
The Sheriff's Office is headquartered at 1350 Norris Road in Bakersfield. There are 15 additional substations located throughout the county. They are:

- Boron
- Buttonwillow
- Delano
- Frazier Park
- Glennville
- Kern Valley
- Lamont
- Mojave
- Ridgecrest
- Rosamond
- Rosedale
- Taft
- Tehachapi
- Walker Basin
- Wasco

== Fallen officers ==
Since the establishment of the Kern County Sheriff's Office, 28 officers and citizen volunteers have died while on duty.

On July 25, 2021, Kern County Sheriff's Office Deputy Phillip Campas was killed in the line of duty. Campas was struck by gunfire while entering a residence with a SWAT team formation in an attempt to suppress an active-shooter that had executed family members and was holding additional family hostage. Campas suffered severe injuries in the ambush and was immediately evacuated and transported for medical care. Campas succumbed to the injuries he received.

Campas is a 5-year veteran of the Kern County Sheriff's Office. He has held various assignments including patrol, recruit training officer, SWAT and held a range assignment where he provided firearms training and mentoring to all departmental armed staff. Campas served as a United States Marine prior to being employed with the Sheriff's Office.

== Electoral history ==
The current sheriff, Donny Youngblood, was reelected on June 5, 2018. Chief Deputy Justin Fleeman unsuccessfully contested Sheriff Donny Youngblood in the June 2018 primary election. Fleeman's campaign made a point to expose corruption and ethics violations by Sheriff Youngblood and the Kern County Sheriff's Office. Youngblood in turn criticized Fleeman for attempting to ruin his reputation and the reputation of the department. On May 29, 2019, Fleeman was fired after having been placed on administrative leave on September 20, 2018. In response to his firing, Fleeman filed a wrongful termination lawsuit. The court granted the county's move to dismiss on the ground that Fleeman failed to state a cognizable claim under Labor Code Section 232.5. However, in July 2025, the civil lawsuit was settled out of court. Under the terms of the agreement, Kern County paid a $300,000 settlement to Fleeman, with $131,000 of the total allocated for his attorney's fees. Additionally, the county agreed to seal Fleeman's personnel file, issue him a retirement identification badge, and promised not to oppose any concealed carry weapons permit applications he might submit.The county denied liability, and maintained that Fleeman was let go because he chose to run against incumbent Sherriff Donny Youngblood.

== Rank structure ==
Title	Insignia
Sheriff	
Undersheriff	
Chief Deputy	
Commander	
Lieutenant	
Sergeant	
Senior Deputy	
Deputy	

== Notable incidents ==
In 2006, Sheriff Donny Youngblood declared it was "better financially" for Kern County to commit a "bad shooting" and kill a suspect, then pay the family "three million bucks", versus them crippling a suspect and having to "take care of them for life".

In December 2010, Jose Lucero, a recovering drug addict with mental health issues, died after a confrontation with Kern County Sheriff's deputies. The family contended that the deputies beat Lucero to death. In November 2012, Lucero's family was awarded a $4.5 million judgment in a wrongful death lawsuit against the deputies, the sheriff's office, and Kern County.

On May 9, 2013, it was reported that Bakersfield resident David Sal Silva died after resisting arrest. The assault on Silva was video recorded by multiple witnesses, although the resultant video was seized by law enforcement on the scene. Silva's autopsy report uses the description "acute intoxication" to describe Silva's condition when he died. His blood alcohol level was 0.095, over the limit for driving a motor vehicle. The autopsy also found methamphetamine and amphetamine, both stimulants, in Silva's blood.

In December 2015, press reports indicated Kern County law enforcement officers killed more people per capita than any other county in the United States. In May 2015, it was reported that the Kern Country Sheriff's Department settled two civil lawsuits in five days in misconduct cases. One settlement, reported to be in the amount of $1 million, was paid out to a survivor of a sexual assault committed by Kern County Sheriff's Deputy Gabriel Lopez. The Kern County Sheriff's office has been found to have a longstanding program of attempting cash payoffs to women who have accused deputies of sexual assault.

== Weapons ==
Deputies are allowed to carry the Glock 22 .40 S&W handgun which is usually equipped with a tactical flashlight and has night sights. The Glock Model 23 .40 S&W is also an option for deputies to choose from as well. All of the Glock pistols have a 5 lb trigger pull.

In addition to the Glock pistols deputies also have access to AR-15 5.56×45mm rifles as well. Deputies also have access to the Remington 870 pump shotgun.

== See also ==
- List of law enforcement agencies in California
- Bakersfield Police Department
