= Tulare County Sheriff's Office =

Law enforcement agency in California, United States

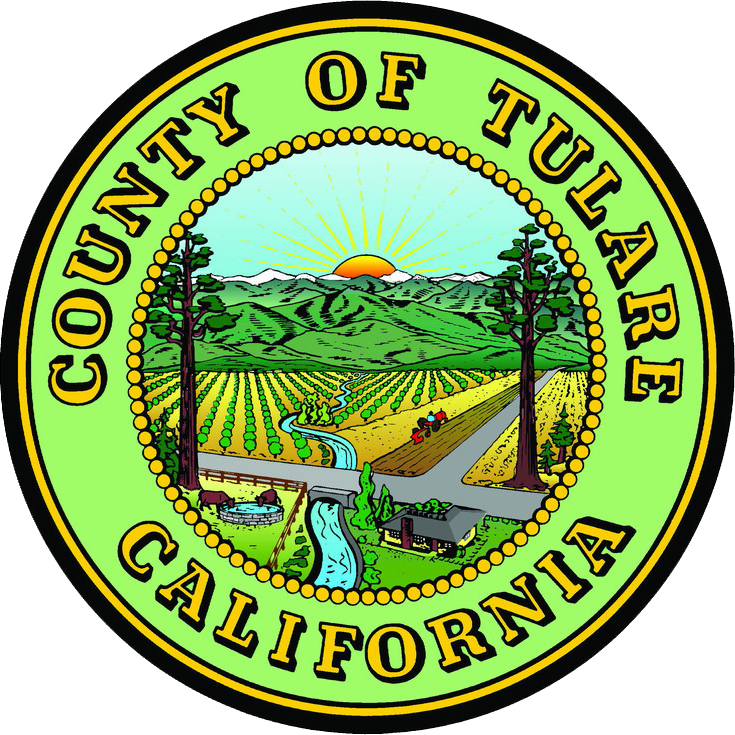
- Seal of Tulare County, California
- Common name: Tulare County Sheriff
- Abbreviation: TCSO

Agency overview
- Formed: 1852

Jurisdictional structure
- Operations jurisdiction: Tulare County, California, California, U.S.
- Map of Tulare County Sheriff's Office's jurisdiction
- Population: 473,117
- General nature: Local civilian police

Operational structure
- Headquarters: 833 S. Akers Street Visalia, California 93277
- Agency executive: Mike Boudreaux, Sheriff-Coroner

Website
- tularecounty.ca.gov/sheriff/

The Tulare County Sheriff's Office (TCSO) is an American law enforcement agency that is charged with law enforcement duties within the boundaries of Tulare County, California. As of the 2020 United States Census, the county was inhabited by 473,117 people.

== Line of duty deaths ==
Since the department's establishment, 16 sworn officers and one police dog have died in the line of duty.

Officers:

| Name | Rank | Date of death | Cause |
|---|---|---|---|
| John Nicolas Wren | Deputy Sheriff | 5 Jul 1889 | Gunfire |
| Oscar A. Beaver | Deputy Sheriff | 6 Aug 1892 | Gunfire |
| Carl Oscar Johnson | Special Deputy | 30 Sep 1951 | Gunfire |
| Ross Clifford Cochran | Deputy Sheriff | 19 Nov 1951 | Automobile accident |
| Vernon Cox | Deputy Sheriff | 15 Apr 1965 | Automobile accident |
| Carlos Manuel Magana | Deputy Sheriff | 9 Dec 1970 | Struck by train |
| Monty Lewis Conley | Detective | 5 Aug 1985 | Automobile accident |
| Joe Ruiz Landin | Detective | 5 Aug 1985 | Automobile accident |
| Michael Robert Egan | Deputy Sheriff | 2 May 1989 | Automobile accident |
| Kevin Eugene Elium | Deputy Sheriff | 7 Oct 2005 | Automobile accident |
| Kent Haws | Detective | 17 Dec 2007 | Gunfire |
| Greg Hernandez, Jr. | Sergeant | 6 Feb 2009 | Automobile accident |
| Jeremy Wayne Meyst | Correctional Deputy | 24 Dec 2013 | Automobile accident |
| Scott Alfred Ballantyne | Deputy Sheriff | 10 Feb 2016 | Aircraft accident |
| Frank Gonzalez Holguin, III | Deputy Sheriff II | 27 Jan 2021 | COVID-19 |
| Randy Hoppert | Detective | 9 Apr 2026 | Gunfire |

K9:

| Name | Rank | Date of death | Cause |
|---|---|---|---|
| Rocco | K9 | 16 Oct 2019 | Struck by vehicle |
