= Hawthorne Police Department =

Police department of Hawthorne, California, US

The Hawthone Police Department of Hawthorne, California in Los Angeles County, was established in 1922. The Hawthone Police Department serves a community of 84,293 people and employs 100 officers and 60 support staff.

== History ==
The Hawthone Police Department was founded in 1922.

Former Chiefs include Coleman E Young, Kenneth R. Stonebraker, Stephen R. Port, Michael Heffner, Robert Fager, and Michael Ishii.

=== Officer shootings ===
In 2016, a Hawthorne police officer with six years service was shot in the leg during a gunfight.

On April 7, 2019, A Hawthorne police officer, with 15 years of service was shot in the leg near a shopping center in Manhattan Beach. Police arrived at the scene in response to reports of a man chasing a woman in a "domestic dispute at a Marriott hotel" on Sunday morning. Police exchanged gunfire with the shooter who dressed in military fatigues and used a "high-capacity weapon to shoot at officers." There were approximately "60 SWAT officers in full gear" responding to the incident.

=== Criminal incidents ===
In early April 2019, 30-year-old Jacob Ryan Munn allegedly fatally shot his ex-girlfriend, 28-year-old Brenda Renteria, during a custody exchange. As Renteria stepped outside the Hawthorne police station where she had dropped off their 17-month-old son, Munn shot Renteria with his shotgun.

According to a Hawthorne PD June 9, 2019 press release, two of the three suspects in an alleged assault and robbery at a gas station on June 7 were arrested and booked. A video of the arrest of one of the men, a 24-year old, was widely shared on social media. The woman who uploaded the video of the arrest identified herself as the girlfriend of a man killed by police in 2015.

==== Viral video capturing the shooting of a dog while arresting owner ====
On June 30, 2013, a Hawthorne police officer named Christopher Hoffman shot and killed a dog in front of his owner during an arrest. A graphic video of the shooting captured by a bystander went viral on Reddit, sparking national outrage and protests against Hoffman's use of excessive lethal force against Max, the two-year-old Rottweiler belonging to Leon Rosby, 52, the owner under arrest. In the viral video, Rosby can be seen recording police officer activity with his cellphone and asking officers why there were no black officers present. As Rosby is approached by two Hawthorne police officers, Jeffrey Salmon and Michael Matson, he then puts his dog in a nearby car, and voluntarily puts his hands behind his back during the arrest. As he is being handcuffed, Rosby's dog starts barking and jumps out of the car through an open window. When the dog approaches the officers, barking, Hoffman shoots the dog shot four times, killing the dog.

In the days following the shooting and backlash, Rosby was charged with six felonies, including intimidation of a witness and making criminal threats, to which he pled not guilty. After a two-week trial, a judge dismissed the remaining charges in 2015. Rosby pursued a federal civil rights lawsuit against the city of Hawthorne, alleging violation of civil rights, negligence, and an intention to "humiliate and harm [Rosby] and to cause psychological trauma."

== See also ==
- Crime in California
- Law enforcement in the United States
- List of law enforcement agencies in California
