= Santa Clara County Sheriff's Office =

Law enforcement agency in California, United States

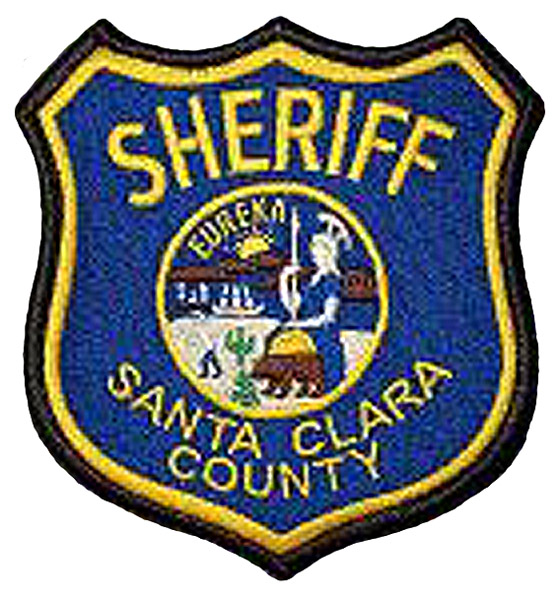
- Patch of the Santa Clara County Sheriff's Office

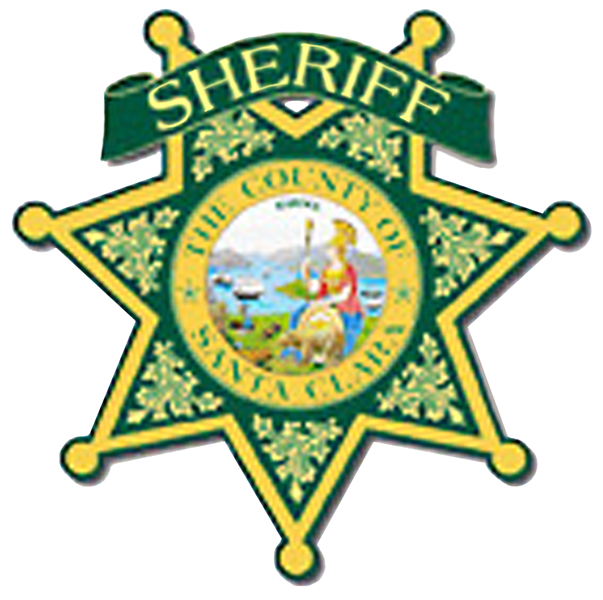
- Logo prior to 1990
- Abbreviation: SCCSO

Agency overview
- Formed: 1850; 176 years ago
- Annual budget: $298,940,800

Jurisdictional structure
- Operations jurisdiction: Santa Clara, California, USA
- Jurisdiction of Santa Clara County Sheriff's Office
- Area: 1,304 square miles (3,380 km^{2})
- Population: 1,936,259 (2020)
- General nature: Local civilian police

Operational structure
- Headquarters: San Jose, California
- Deputy Sheriff, Correctional Deputy, Correctional Officers: 1429
- Civilian employees: 312
- Agency executive: Bob Jonsen, Sheriff

Facilities
- Stations: 4
- Airbases: 1
- Helicopters: 1

Website
- www.sccgov.org/sites/sheriff

The Santa Clara County Sheriff's Office is a local law enforcement agency that serves Santa Clara County, California. It provides general-service law enforcement to unincorporated areas of Santa Clara County, as well as incorporated cities within the county that have contracted with the agency for law-enforcement services such as Saratoga, Cupertino, and Los Altos Hills. The Santa Clara Valley Transportation Authority also contracted with the Sheriff's Office for law enforcement service.

== History ==
On December 15, 1998, Laurie Smith became the 28th person to hold the position of sheriff in Santa Clara County, California and the first woman law enforcement officer to hold the office of sheriff in the history of California. In early 2022, Smith retired while under grand jury corruption charges and after a unanimous vote of no confidence by the county Board of Supervisors. She was convicted in November.

On August 27, 2015, mentally-ill inmate Michael Tyree was beaten to death by three jail guards. The guards were convicted of second-degree murder in 2017.

Two inmates escaped from custody in San Jose in November 2016. Two more inmates escaped from custody in Palo Alto in November 2017.

In November 2022, Bob Jonsen was elected to succeed Smith. Jonsen served as Chief of Police for the City of Palo Alto prior to his election.

== Organization ==
The department is divided into four major bureaus — Field Operations, Support Services, Jail Operations and Administrative Services.

== Rank structure ==
Currently, the Santa Clara County Sheriffs Department currently has the following Titles

Title	Insignia
Sheriff	
Undersheriff	
Assistant Sheriff	
Captain	
Lieutenant	
Sergeant	
Deputy Sheriff	

In addition to the full-time sworn staff, the Sheriff's Office has 65 Reserve Deputy Sheriffs. To support the entire operation, the department employs 223 non-sworn, civilian staff.

== Fallen officers ==
Since the establishment of the Santa Clara Sheriff's Office, seven officers have died while on duty.

== See also ==
- List of law enforcement agencies in California
