= Central Marin Police Authority =

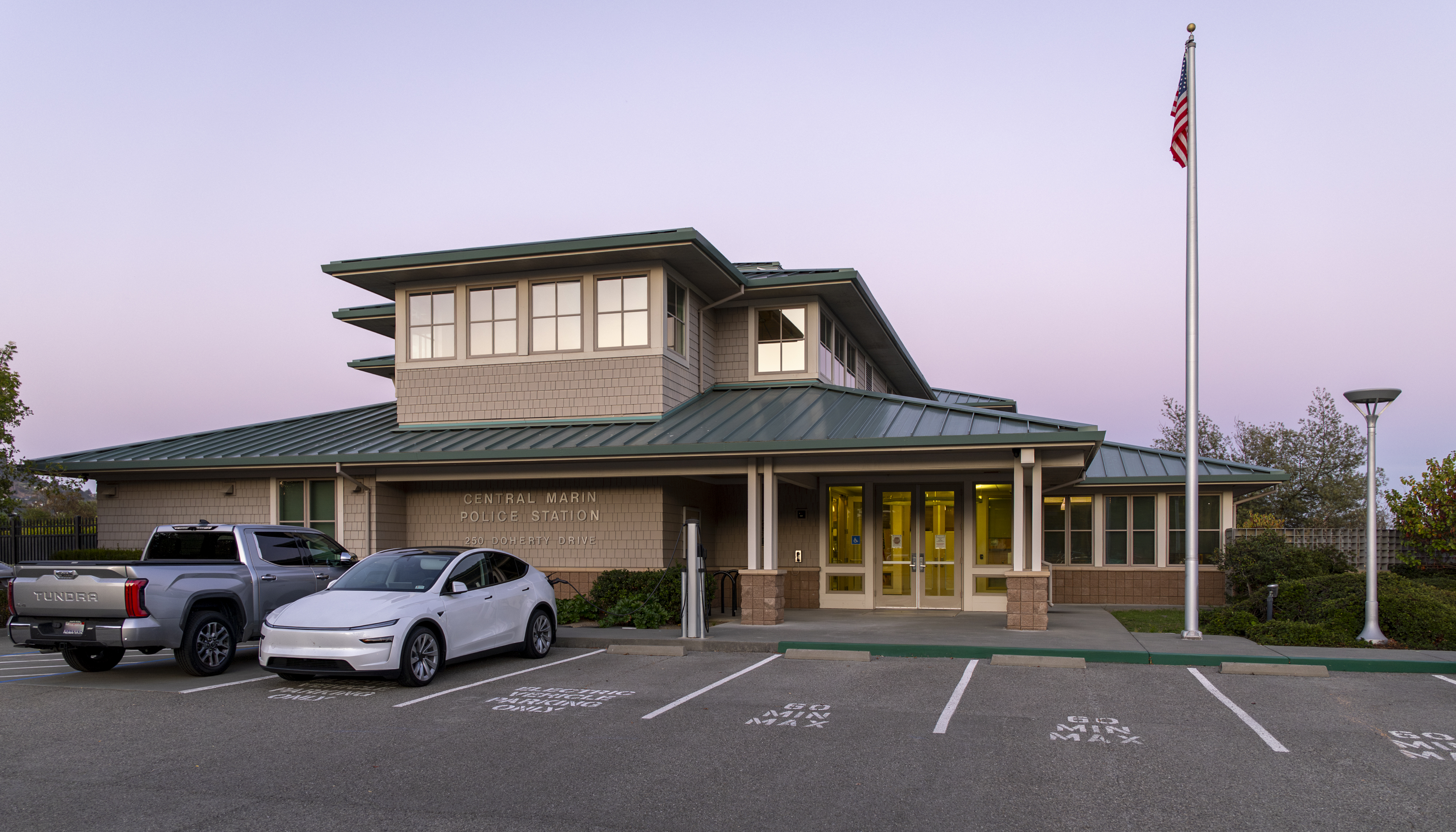
Central Marin Police Station

The Central Marin Police Authority (CMPA) is a police agency in Marin County, California, covering Corte Madera, Larkspur, San Anselmo and portions of Greenbrae. In 1980 Corte Madera and its neighbor Larkspur merged their police departments into the Twin Cities Police Authority. Then on January 1, 2013, after two years of planning and public discussion, the Twin Cities Police Authority and the police department of San Anselmo merged agencies and became the Central Marin Police Authority.

In 2015, the Central Marin Police Authority consolidated its police dispatchers with Marin County, California, after discussion began two years prior. It signed a contract to pay the county $659,935 every year to cover the salary and benefits of five full-time operators. Prior to the consolidation, the Central Marin Police Authority dispatchers handled 35,000 calls a year.
