= Los Angeles School Police Department =

Police department in Los Angeles, California

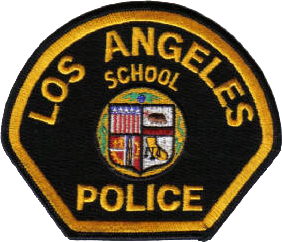
- Patch of the LASPD

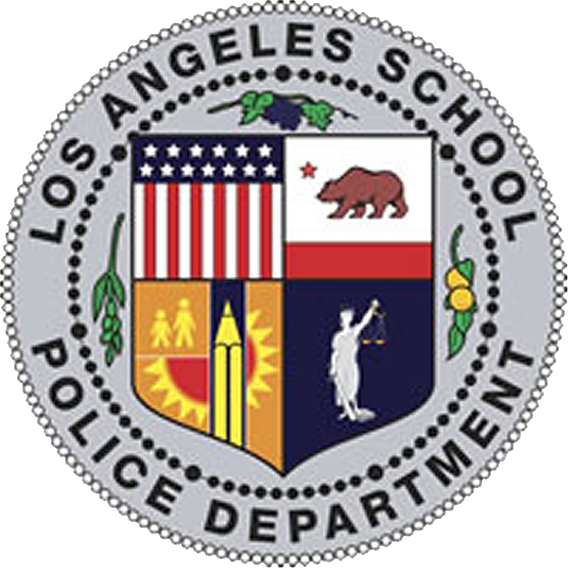
- Seal of the LASPD

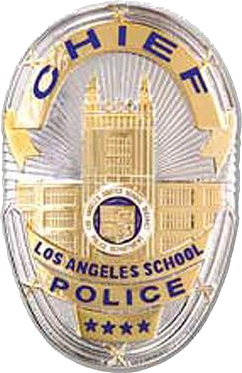
- Badge of the LASPD's chief
- Common name: Los Angeles School Police
- Abbreviation: LASPD

Agency overview
- Formed: 1988
- Employees: Approx. 530

Jurisdictional structure
- Operations jurisdiction: Los Angeles, California, U.S.
- Area: 708 square miles (1,800 km^{2})
- Legal jurisdiction: County of Los Angeles
- General nature: Civilian police

Operational structure
- Headquarters: 125 North Beaudry Avenue, Los Angeles, CA 90012
- Police officers: 405
- Non-sworn employees School safety officers: 49 110
- Agency executive: Steven Zipperman, Interim Chief of Police
- Parent agency: Los Angeles Unified School District

Facilities
- Schools: 1,030

Website
- Official Site

The Los Angeles School Police Department (LASPD) is a law enforcement agency in Los Angeles, California, whose duties are to provide police services to the Los Angeles Unified School District (LAUSD) (thus, sometimes called L.A. Unified Police), also enforcing state and city laws. LASPD officers assist staff with disturbances and potential criminal activity on the campuses and in the surrounding communities on a daily basis.

== Organization ==
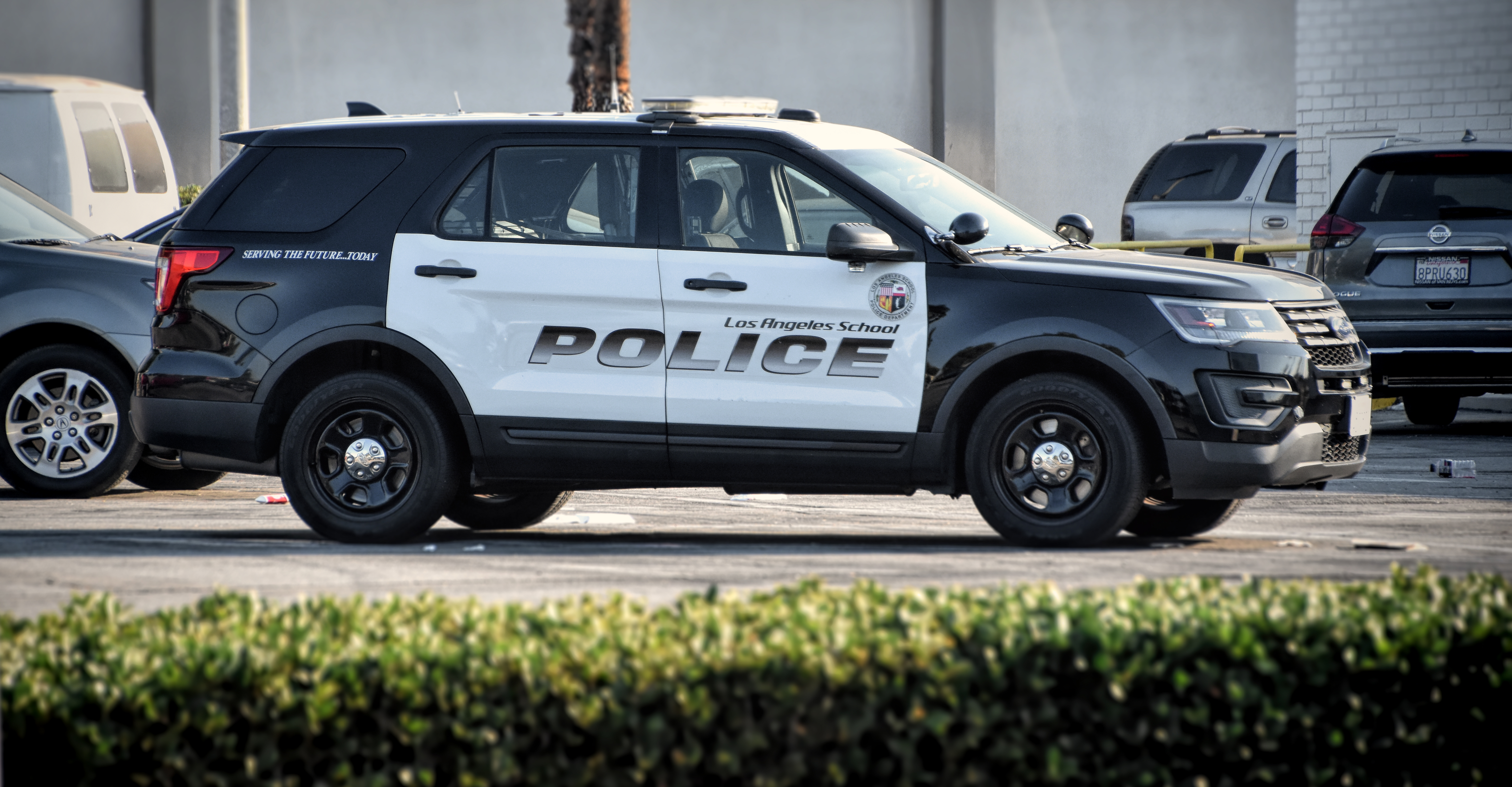
Ford Police Interceptor Utility used by the LASPD

The Los Angeles School Police Department was established in August 1948 to provide police services to the Los Angeles Unified School District. The department deploys six police divisions (Northwest, Northeast, West, Central, East, and South) with assignments consisted of Canine (K-9), Youth Services Divisions (Police Explorers, PALs Program), Safe Passages, Honor Guard, C.R.T. (Critical Response Team), Communications, Recruitment, Training Unit, Fleet Management, Payroll Section, Budget Services Unit, Records Unit, and Crime Analysis Unit.

== Responsibility ==
24 hours a day, the LASPD is responsible for providing police services to:

- A jurisdiction covering 710 square miles (1,800 km^{2})
- Approximately 618,000 students
- Approximately 72,000 teachers, administrators and additional school staff
- Approximately 1,300 schools, centers, and administrative offices

== Ranks ==
The LASPD deploys sworn personnel in a variety of ranks:

Title	Insignia
Chief of police	
Deputy chief of police	
Police lieutenant	
Police sergeant	
Police detective	
Senior police officer	
Police officer	
Police recruit	

== Assignments ==
Assignments within the Police Department include:

- Campus Police Officer
- Patrol Officer
- Field Training Officer
- Criminal Investigation
- Canine
- Special Investigation
- Background Investigation
- Training and Support Services
- Traffic Enforcement
- Technology
- Police Explorers
- Special Response Team (S.R.T.)
- Supervising School Safety Officer (non-sworn position)
- School Safety Officer (non-sworn position)
- Police Dispatcher (civilian position)
- Specialist Reserve Officer (civilian position)
- Records, payroll, subpoena and other clerical support staff (civilian position)

All police officers must complete a probationary period after graduation from the police academy. Prior to selection to any specialized unit, there may also be an additional 3-5 year field assignment prerequisite.

== Controversy ==
The LASPD has accepted crowd- and disturbance-control weapons including one armored vehicle and firearms from the federal government. Superintendent Ramón Cortines of LAUSD confirmed in June 2015 that the district's police force has ended its involvement in a federal program that delivered military-grade weapons to school districts. The decision on the so-called 1033 Program came on the heels of President Obama‘s announcement in May that he was severely restricting the parameters of the program.

On June 23, 2020, following student activism inspired by the Black Lives Matter movement, the LA Unified School District school board considered three resolutions to begin de-funding of the department. Also at issue was the departments use of pepper spray, which had been used 11 times during the 2018–19 school year.

== See also ==
- List of law enforcement agencies in California
- School resource officer
