= Pasadena Police Department (California) =

Police force in California

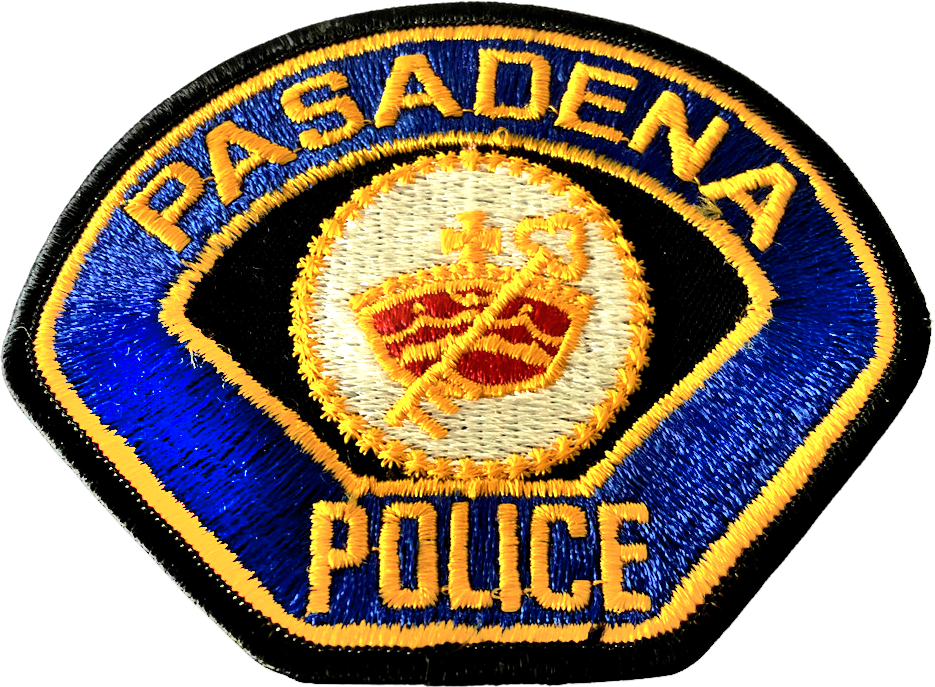
- Pasadena Police Department patch

- Wordmark of the Pasadena Police Department

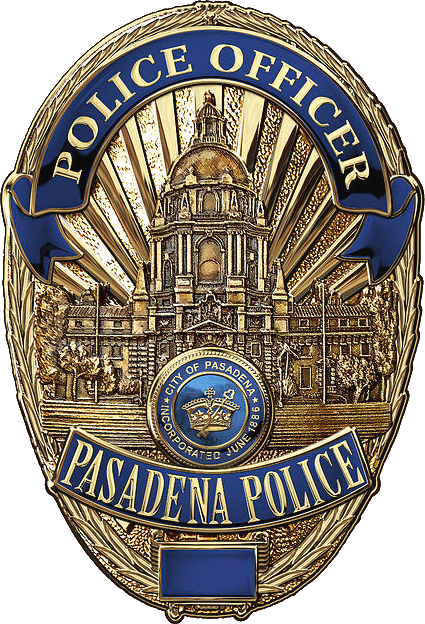
- Badge of the PPD
- Common name: Pasadena Police
- Abbreviation: PPD

Agency overview
- Formed: 1886

Jurisdictional structure
- Operations jurisdiction: Pasadena, California, U.S.
- Map of Pasadena Police Department's jurisdiction
- Area: 23.2 square miles (60 km^{2})
- Population: 133,936
- General nature: Local civilian police

Operational structure
- Police Officers: 254
- Civilians: 126
- Agency executive: Eugene Harris, Chief of Police

Website
- https://www.cityofpasadena.net/police/

The Pasadena Police Department is the police department serving Pasadena, California. The headquarters of the Pasadena Police Department is located at 207 North Garfield Avenue in Pasadena, just a block from the Pasadena City Hall and Paseo Colorado. The department employs 241 sworn officers, 13 reserve officers, and 126 civilian employees. Police chief John Perez, who spent his entire career with the department, retired and was replaced by former PPD Commander, now interim Chief Jason Clawson. The city has selected former San Gabriel Police Department Chief Eugene Harris to take the position in January 2023.

== History ==
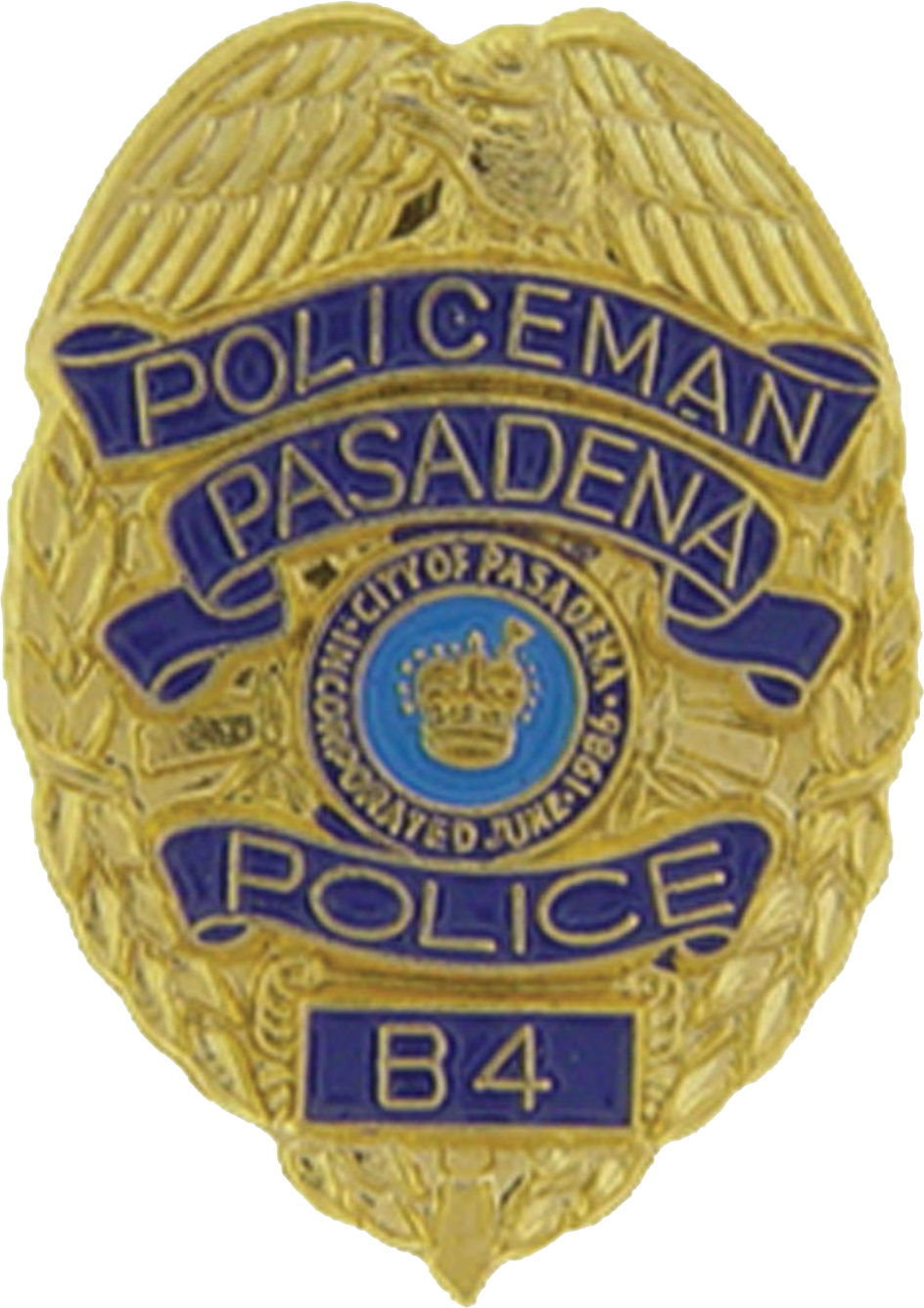
Old ex-badge of the Pasadena Police Department

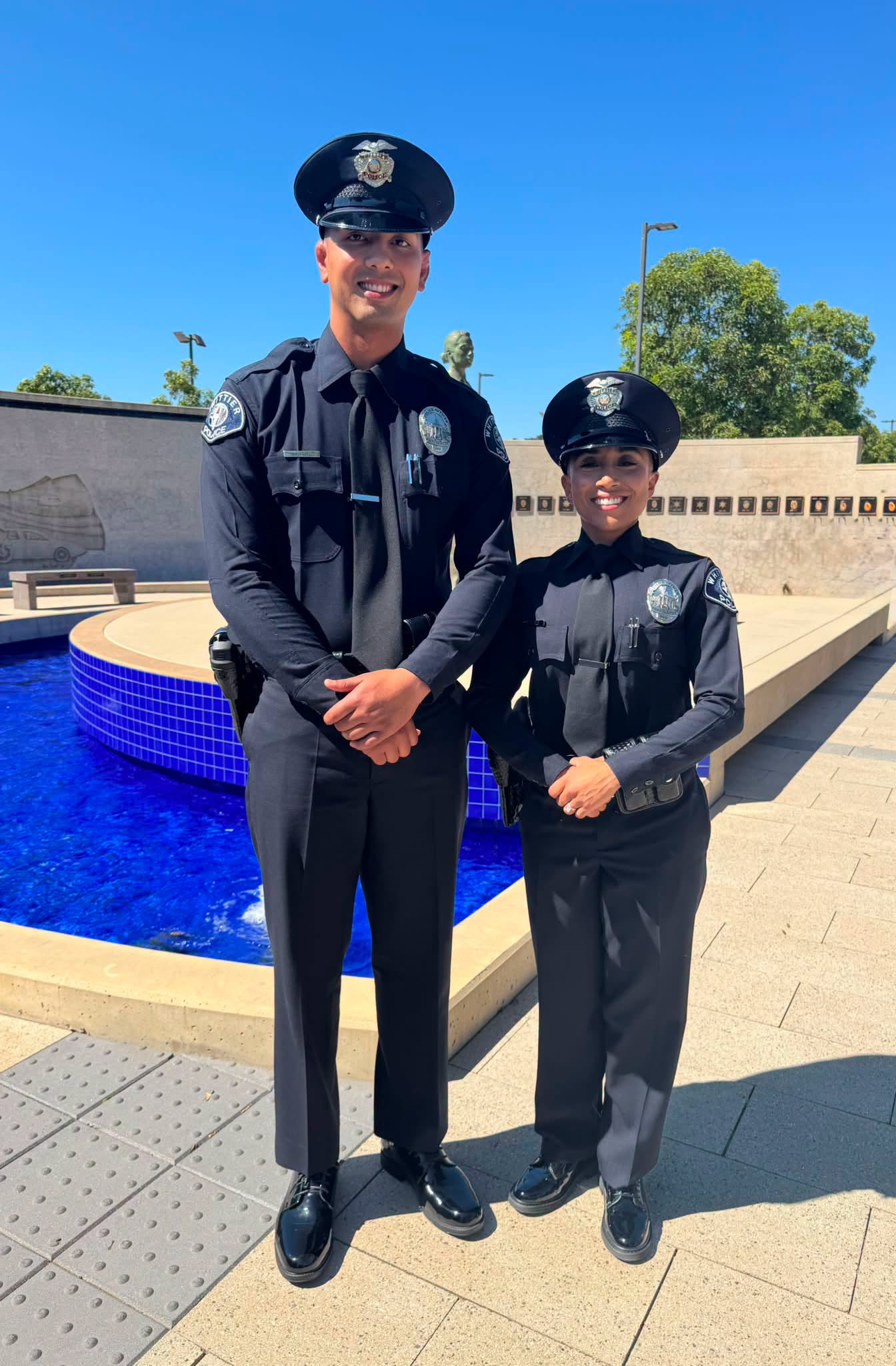
Newly-hired PPD officers in uniform, July 2026.

The Pasadena Police Department was founded in 1886. The department was one of the first police departments to have female police officers. In 2006, Commander Marilyn Diaz left PPD to become the police chief for Sierra Madre, California, becoming Los Angeles County's first female municipal police chief.

In 2004, the Pasadena Unified School District dismantled the Pasadena Unified School District Police Department, amidst budget cuts. As a result, the Pasadena Police Department took over police services for the Pasadena Unified School District and PPD's division on PUSD schools is known as the Safe Schools Team, which is made of eight sworn members—one sergeant and seven officers.

Currently the department patrols some notable events, such as the Rose Bowl and the Tournament of Roses Parade, which works jointly with the Los Angeles County Sheriff's Department.

The department usually steps up patrols by adding officers in areas of recent homicides. This is known as Operation Safe City.

The department utilizes primarily the Orange County Sheriff's Academy in Tustin for academy training. PPD also utilizes the Rio Hondo Regional Police Academy in Whittier.

Since the establishment of the Pasadena Police Department, three officers have died in the line of duty.

=== Tasers ===
PPD has been using Tasers since mid-June 2004.

Three years after the deployment of Tasers, 36-year-old Richard Baisner of Arcadia died after being Tasered once by a Pasadena Police Officer. Baisner was Tasered after resisting arrest against PPD officers. After using "soft restraints" on him while on a gurney, Baisner stopped breathing. An autopsy determined Baisner died from "effects of cocaine intoxication," with other significant factors of hypertrophic heart disease and coronary atherosclerosis.

=== Air support ===
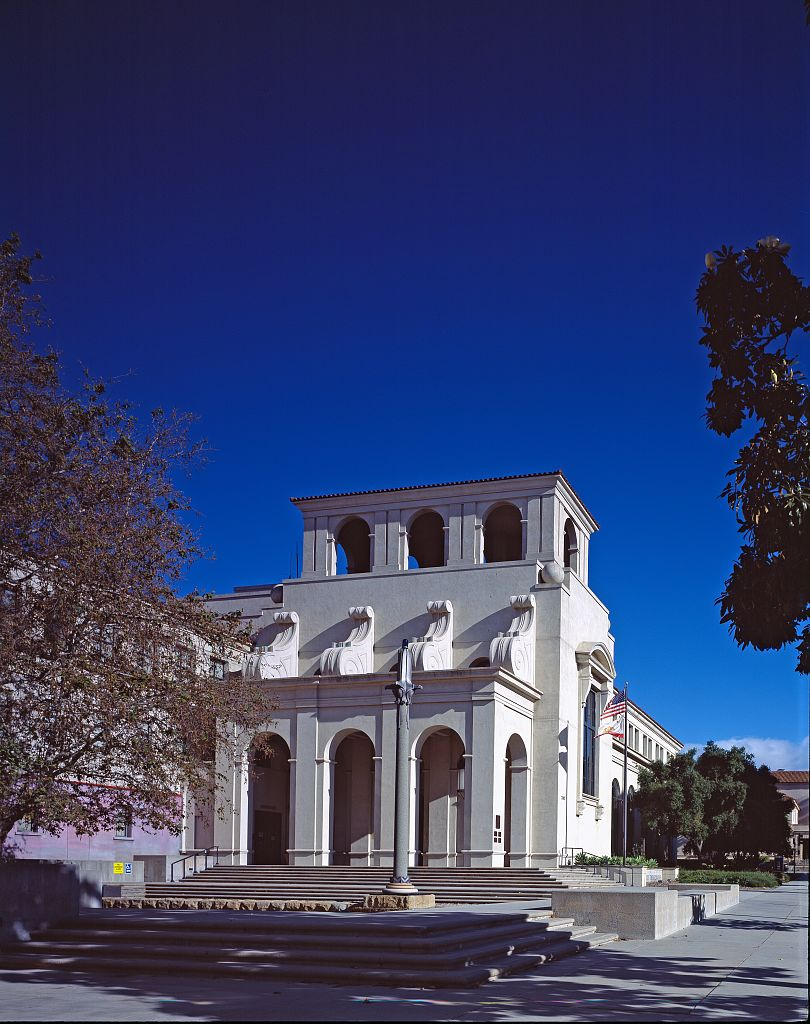
Pasadena Police Department building, designed by architect Robert A. M. Stern and opened in 1990

The department began air operations in 1969 and was one of the first members of the Airborne Law Enforcement Association.

In 1999, the department expanded its operations by creating the Foothill Air Support Team (FAST), working with ten nearby police departments by providing air support to cities that could not afford their own helicopter. Besides Pasadena, cities participating in FAST are Alhambra, Arcadia, Covina, Monrovia, Glendora, San Marino, South Pasadena, Sierra Madre, Pomona, and Irwindale. Three police officers are chosen from the participating FAST cities to work as Tactical Flight Officers, whose duties include observing, monitoring radio frequency for all participating cities, navigating, and coordinating ground units.

Pasadena PD also operates and stores a Eurocopter AS350 Écureuil owned by the Los Angeles Interagency Metropolitan Police Apprehension Crime Task Force (L.A. IMPACT). A pilot and Tactical Flight Officer are assigned full-time to L.A. IMPACT to assist narcotics detectives with high altitude surveillance operations.

The department maintains five of their own helicopters, based at an area near Jet Propulsion Laboratory and the Rose Bowl.

Using a strategy developed by Lieutenant Mike Ingram, Pasadena PD Air Support and the San Gabriel Valley Mosquito and Vector Control District use Pasadena PD helicopters to check swimming pools in 23 cities to ensure cleanliness and to prevent the West Nile virus.

On 17 November 2012, a police helicopter struck another on the ground at the department's heliport, injuring five people. Both aircraft suffered considerable damage.

=== Fleet ===
- MD 500 - 1
- Bell 206 BIII - 1
- Bell OH-58 Kiowa Warrior - 3

== Other departments ==
Some nearby departments rely on the Pasadena Police Department if any department lacks resources.

- Pasadena City College Police and Safety Services - Patrols property of the Pasadena Area Community College District with seven officers and 85 cadets. Officers are not armed, but have direct radio contact with the Pasadena Police Department.
- South Pasadena Police Department - Jurisdiction in the city of South Pasadena with 35 officers. PPD provides air support for the city of South Pasadena. South Pasadena used the Pasadena City Jail and the Pasadena Courthouse until 2004 when switching to the city of Alhambra jail and Alhambra Courthouse, citing high costs, and to allow the cities of Monrovia and Arcadia to use the Pasadena City Jail to house their prisoners after the old Santa Anita Judicial District Courthouse in Monrovia closed down.
- Los Angeles County Sheriff's Department - Has primary jurisdiction on Metro buses and trains running in Pasadena, the Pasadena courthouse, the unincorporated area addressed as "Pasadena, California" (including the Pasadena DMV office), Altadena, and assists the Pasadena Police Department in patrolling the Tournament of Roses Parade.

== See also ==
- List of law enforcement agencies in California
