= 2026 Bakersfield hostage crisis =

Standoff and shooting in California, US

- Location: 35°22′26″N 119°01′09.29″W; Bakersfield, California, US
- Date: June 2–3, 2026; 1:00pm – 4:20am (PDT)
- Attack type: Hostage standoff, police shooting
- Deaths: 1 (the perpetrator)
- Victims: 10 hostages
- Perpetrator: Anthony Scott Searles-Harris
- Motive: Under investigation

On June 2, 2026, a hostage crisis occurred in downtown Bakersfield, California, United States. The hostage crisis started as a confirmed bomb threat at on the second floor of a Chase Bank building occupied by Kern County Superintendent of Schools’ administration offices. The perpetrator, convicted sex offender Anthony Scott Searles-Harris, barricaded himself inside the building with a total of ten hostages. After 15 hours, all ten hostages were released safely, and Searles-Harris was fatally shot by FBI Hostage Rescue Team agents in a shootout. His motive is unknown.

== Events ==
Shortly after 1:00 p.m. PDT on June 2, Searles-Harris arrived at 1515 17th Street claiming to have a bomb strapped to his chest and barricaded himself with ten hostages on the second floor, where some of the offices of the Kern County Superintendent of Schools’ administration were located. Some of the hostages were tied up by the hostage taker, who is said to have made a bomb threat, prompting evacuations and a law enforcement response. The Bakersfield Police Department was supported by multiple local and federal law enforcement agencies. More than 150 FBI personnel, including SWAT, crisis negotiators, Special Agent Bomb Technicians and the Hostage Rescue Team were deployed to the crisis.

Authorities were able to establish contact with a diabetic hostage who had her phone with her. Searles-Harris claimed that he had explosive devices attached to him and to some hostages. Police negotiated the release of two hostages at 4 p.m. and around 8:30 p.m. Federal agents from the Hostage Rescue Team entered the building after concerns regarding the hostage with diabetes health after her phone died, and after Searles-Harris was seen moving erratically by the agents, they fatally shot him.

== Perpetrator ==
Law enforcement identified the perpetrator as 41-year-old Anthony Scott Searles-Harris (June 21, 1984 – June 3, 2026), a convicted sex offender and longtime resident of Oildale, California, less than five miles away from Bakersfield. Court documents confirmed that Searles-Harris had been living in Oildale since as early as June 2009, and was married once for two years. Searles-Harris previously served in the United States Army from 2006 until 2007 before being dishonorably discharged for going absent without leave.

Prior to his death, Searles-Harris had been released early from state prison in 2018 following an appeals court decision after a Kern County judge handed down a 12-year sentence on September 15, 2014, in connection of an October 2012 arrest in Oildale. On October 15, 2012, Harris, alongside another man named Randy Dale Miller, were arrested after he provided alcohol and drugs to two 13 and 17-year-old girls and engaged in sex acts with them. Redacted investigative reports filed in Kern County by deputies say that detectives began the investigation that began on July 29, 2011, when authorities informed that Harris was holding wild parties with them, and authorities later discovered expletive videos and photos of oral sex on their phones. In August 2017, an appeals court reversed one of the convictions, finding that Searles-Harris did not assault the 13-year-old, while his other convictions were upheld before being released the following year.

== Investigation ==
During the standoff, the Searles-Harris' residence in Oildale was searched. A motive was not determined, but investigators said they were aware of a YouTube video being released by Searles-Harris in October 2025, showing himself in a video called Labeled a Monster. In the video, he accused law enforcement of planting evidence in his previous cases.

== See also ==
- List of killings by law enforcement officers in the United States, June 2026
