= List of killings by law enforcement officers in the United States, June 2026 =

This is a list of people reported killed by non-military law enforcement officers in the United States in June 2026, whether in the line of duty or not, and regardless of reason or method. The listing documents the occurrence of a death, making no implications regarding wrongdoing or justification on the part of the person killed or officer involved. Killings are arranged by date of the incident that caused death. Different death dates, if known, are noted in the description. The table below lists 104 people.

== June 2026 ==
Date	Name (age) of deceased	Race	Location	Description
2026-06-30	Kristopher Glanden (37)	White	Magnolia, Delaware	Delaware State Police troopers respond to a report of a Frederica man attempting suicide. When troopers arrived, troopers learned that Glanden was armed with a 9mm handgun and attempting to break into a home where his ex-partner and other family members were sheltering. Glanden was standing in the front yard of the home when officers arrived. He refused to repeat commands and pointed a handgun towards the troopers. Troopers fired their weapons, killing him.
2026-06-29	unidentified male	Unknown	Atmore, Alabama	Escambia County deputies responded to a report of shots fired and found a suspect who threatened neighbors and deputies. The suspect then barricaded himself inside the residence and refused to surrender. When SWAT team placed an armoured vehicle in front of his residence, the suspect came out carrying a shotgun. Despite less-lethal efforts, the suspect raised the gun at police before being shot and killed.
2026-06-29	Dubraye McDaniel (64)	Black	Grantville, Georgia	A Coweta County deputy conducted a traffic stop on a SUV for reasons unknown. The deputy made contact with the driver at the rear of the SUV. At some point, he suddenly got back into the driver's seat and the deputy tried to remove him from there. A second deputy arrived and used a taser but ineffective. The driver then fired a gun at deputies before he was struck by returned fire.
2026-06-29	Darius Chappell (34)	Black	Clarksville, Tennessee	On June 29, 2026, Montgomery County Sheriff's deputies and Clarksville Pollicelocated Chappell to serve a felony parole violation warrant. Chappell fled on foot before being tased multiple times and bitten by a CPD K9 for nearly a minute, which left him with superficial wounds. However, medical staff cleared for his booking. According to his mother and five inmates, Chappell was in medical distress and pleaded for medical assistance in the next few days, but was unheeded. He died on July 3, 2026, as a result. His death had been ruled a homicide.
2026-06-29	Napolian Marquez Powell (27)	Black	Davie, Florida	Broward County deputies were attempting to arrest a man on an outstanding warrant who had previously fled from police and was linked to other crimes through DNA evidence. Members of the Broward County Sheriff's Office's fugitive and gang unit approached the suspect while he was pumping gas at a local Wawa gas station. He took off on foot and ran from deputies while armed with a firearm. Other deputies caught up to him and tackled him at a neighboring McDonald's parking lot, but began resisting and officers were unable to take the gun away from him. Deputies then conducted a tactical retreat while repeatedly ordering the suspect to drop the weapon. The man attempted to point the firearm at deputies before deputies fired back at the suspect, killing him at the McDonald's parking lot.
2026-06-28	Kasey Sledlock (37)	White	St. Petersburg, Florida	Police responded to a report that Sledlock was attempting suicide. His brother took a knife from him, but Sledlock had it again by the time police arrived. Officers tased him, causing him to drop the knife, and tased him again when he reached for it. Sledlock picked up the knife again, and an officer shot him when he began approaching police.
2026-06-28	Brodie Quinton Reese (31)	Unknown	Clinton, South Carolina	Police shot and killed a local man (formerly from Orangeburg) at an apartment complex for unknown reasons. Few details were immediately released.
2026-06-28	unidentified male (61)	Unknown	Livonia, Michigan	Police responded to a reported explosion at a home. Police found the homeowner in a neighbor's yard and shot him after he allegedly pointed a handgun at them.
2026-06-28	Andrew Wade Herman (35)	Unknown	Indiana, Pennsylvania	Police responded to a domestic disturbance and pursued a man with a shovel. After a foot chase, the man stabbed an officer, who shot him.
2026-06-28	Brandon Michael Roberts (31)	Native American	Fairbanks, Alaska	Two state troopers shot and killed a man in the Bentley Mall parking lot. Few details were immediately released.
2026-06-27	Roger Dean Campbell (48)	White	Logan, Utah	Campbell was being investigated for violating a pretrial protective order that was issued previously after he had been arrested for domestic violence offenses. Cache County deputies attempted a stop on his vehicle before he fled. A deputy shot at his vehicle during the chase immediately before Campbell crashed into a tree. Campbell died in the incident.
2026-06-27	Oscar Granados Colindres (17)	Hispanic	Wappingers Falls, New York	Police responded to a report of an emotionally disturbed person threatening suicide. Responding officers shot Granados Colindres, who was holding a knife. The footage was released by the New York State Attorney General.
2026-06-27	Jeremiah Louis Partridge (32)	Unknown	Chandler, Arizona	During a domestic dispute investigation, CPD officers encountered a man who was armed with a shotgun sitting at the front yard. They ordered Partridge to drop the gun before they shot and killed him.
2026-06-27	unidentified male	Unknown	Centennial, Colorado	Arapahoe County deputies responded to a call regarding a suspicious person when they engaged a man armed with a large metal pole. He struck one of the deputies with it before less-lethal means were deployed, but unsuccessful. Deputies subsequently shot him.
2026-06-27	unidentified male (34)	Unknown	Southgate, Michigan	SPD officers confronted a man and woman outside a Meijer who they suspected stole from the store. The male suspect pulled out a sharp object when he was fatally shot by an officer.
2026-06-26	Andrew Seth Henderlight (39)	Unknown	Knoxville, Tennessee	Knox County Police tried to pull over an unidentified vehicle, driven by Henderlight, for speeding, but he sped off, leading to a 30-minute-pursuit. For reasons unknown, they shot and killed Henderlight during the encounter.
2026-06-26	Morris Selden (65)	Unknown	Broomfield, Colorado	A domestic disturbance investigation led BPD officers to shoot and kill a suspect for unknown reasons.
2026-06-26	Xavier Alexander Aguirre (22)	White	Phoenix, Arizona	Phoenix Police responded to a home near the Avalon Hills area for a domestic disturbance in north Phoenix. They were talking to a woman when a man came out and chased another man with a knife. They fatally shot the armed man. The footage was released.
2026-06-26	Thomas Anthony Hawkins III (25)	Black	San Marcos, Texas	Officers respond to an apartment complex to arrest a suspect with active warrants dating back to 2020. Officers found the brother after arrival. When he was informed of the reasons for the officers' arrival, he went back inside to get the suspect, who exited the apartment with a knife. He lunged at officers while holding the knife raised near his head before officers fatally shot him.
2026-06-25	Michael Randolph Frohock (43)	White	Watkinsville, Georgia	Oconee County deputies responded to a home for a local suicidal subject intended to harm himself with a knife and was still armed. the subject reportedly pointed a weapon at them before one opened fire.
2026-06-25	Derek Torres (60)	Unknown	Chimayo, New Mexico	A woman called the police after Torres, who was intoxicated, threatened to kill her and himself and chased her with a knife at a home near Highway 76. When Rio Arriba County deputies arrived and shot him for reasons unknown. Torres later barricaded himself. Deputies found him and took him to the hospital, where he died.
2026-06-25	unidentified male	Unknown	Detroit, Michigan	Detroit Police were serving a search warrant on a suspect at a residence in the Evergreen-Outer Drive neighborhood. As the officers came in, the suspect fired at them. Officers returned fire and killed the man.
2026-06-25	Brandon Butts (33)	White	Conneaut, Ohio	Ashtabula County sheriff's deputies and CPD officers were executing a felony warrant on a person, who was inside a basement with another individual. After evacuating the other individual, law enforcement shot the subject when they perceived a threat.
2026-06-25	Caleb Webber (24)	White	Evansville, Indiana	A plainclothes EPD detective responded to a reported overdose at a home. The detective shot the man in the home after he fired at him.
2026-06-24	Russell Wayne Heide (55)	White	Archie, Missouri	Cass County deputies responded to reports of a disturbance where they exchanged fire with an armed man. The suspect, Heide, was killed.
2026-06-24	Juan Jose Jimenez (44)	Hispanic	Phoenix, Arizona	A DPS detective shot Jimenez in the east side of the city. No other details were released.
2026-06-24	Kadir Skinner (19)	Black	Wilmington, Delaware	An officer shot and killed Skinner near a home. Police said Skinner had pointed a gun at a group of people, then fled before the officer shot him. Witnesses said Skinner was unarmed and was running away from a dog with a group of people.
2026-06-24	LeRoy Brooks (40)	Black	Pigeon Forge, Tennessee	Sevier County sheriff’s deputies and officers were serving a warrant on a wanted suspect, for reasons unknown, three deputies shot the man.
2026-06-23	Josue White (32)	Hispanic	San Diego, California	Police responded to reports of a knife-wielding man, Josue White threatening to kill his mother in the Cortez Hill neighborhood. White barricaded himself in his apartment, and a stand-off ensued, during which White threw objects out of his window and set his room on fire. Eventually, police entered the apartment and shot and killed White as he charged toward them with a knife. SDPD released the footage.
2026-06-23	Edwin Valdez (22)	Hispanic	Mesquite, Texas	Valdez was struck and killed by an off-duty Mesquite police officer who was driving when Valdez was setting up a road closure on I-635.
2026-06-23	Jerome Marquis Willis (33)	Black	Columbus, Georgia	Willis, a homicide suspect who had been seen leaving the scene, was located by CPD officers at a parking lot. Officers released a K9 to apprehend Willis before he fired at them, wounding the K9 and an officer. The officer returned fire, killing him.
2026-06-23	Nicholaus Oxendine (35)	Black	Savannah, Georgia	Two SPD officers spotted a man who was loitering around a closed business. They stopped him for questioning. During which, the man attacked the officers, prompting one of which to fire.
2026-06-23	unidentified female (49)	Unknown	Stanley, Virginia	During a welfare check, Page County deputies found the woman barricaded herself inside a residence while armed with a gun. While deputies were attempting to negotiate with her, she fired the gun at her head but only grazing herself. She tried to run and deputy tried to tase her, but unsuccessful. When she raised the gun again, deputies shot and killed her.
2026-06-22	unidentified male	Unknown	Jurupa Valley, California	A Riverside County deputy responded to a report of a woman screaming for reasons unknown. When he arrived, he encountered a man swinging a hammer and approaching him. The deputy fired shots, killing the man.
2026-06-21	Dudane Anderson III (27)	Black	Tampa, Florida	A Hillsborough County deputy in an unmarked cruiser was involved in a crash that killed a pedestrian.
2026-06-21	unidentified male (17)	Hispanic	Melissa, Texas	Officers respond to a house where they encountered a man during a late evening situation with another person. When they arrived, they encountered an armed man and another person inside the home. One male officer fatally shot the man during the confrontation. The officer was later placed on administrative leave while routine internal and criminal investigations are undertaken.
2026-06-20	Robert Castro (23)	Hispanic	Lancaster, California	An LASD deputy responded to a call regarding a person armed with two knives. Upon arrival, the suspect stabbed the deputy before the deputy fired and killed him. The footage was released by police.
2026-06-20	Marcus Barnett (27)	Black	Sanford, Florida	During the midnight hours, officers came upon a large Midway block party and started dispersing the crowd. One officer found himself in the middle of an "active and rapidly evolving situation involving gunfire in a large crowd." One of the two men, from Orange City, Florida, responsible for the incident was fatally shot by a Sanford County deputy.
2026-06-19	Daniel Bolinger (37)	White	Crestview Hills, Kentucky	Police responded to reports of a disturbance at a home. Officers encounter Bolinger, armed with a knife, and shot him after several minutes.
2026-06-19	Lamin Simmons (48)	Black	New York City, New York	NYPD responded to a shots fired call before the situation escalated into an armed standoff in the Bedford–Stuyvesant neighborhood of Brooklyn. Hostage rescue team evacuated several people leaving only an elderly couple at the same floor with the suspect. Officers eventually moved in the apartment building and Simmons, the suspect, shot a detective before being shot dead by at least four officers. No other individuals were injured.
2026-06-19	Gregory Anguiano (42)	Hispanic	Madera Ranchos, California	A caller told police that a man was seen on the residence security camera. When a Madera County deputy came to investigate, she got into a fight with the suspect. The suspect managed to disarm her taser and stunned her before reaching toward her service weapon. She fired at the suspect, killing him. Two neighboring residents also helped give aid to the deputy. Prior to the shooting, people in the area say the suspect began throwing rocks at passing vehicles.
2026-06-19	Patti Wilson (31)	White	Grand Junction, Colorado	A stabbing suspect was located at a Dairy Queen parking lot by two GJPD officers. Police shot Wilson before she drove off, hit multiple vehicles, and stopped. She was found dead inside the vehicle.
2026-06-18	Michah Cleary (41)	Unknown	Ridgecrest, California	RPD officers stopped a man for failing to stop at a stop sign. The driver, Cleary, became uncooperative and later pointed a handgun at officers, prompting them to fire. Cleary died a day later. Police said Cleary was wanted for an assault with a deadly weapon at the time.
2026-06-18	Jordan Michael Donahue (21)	Unknown	St. Peter, Minnesota	A Mankato police officer attempted to pull over an unidentified vehicle for speeding. The driver refused leading to a pursuit, avoiding stop sticks, and fleeing through St. Peter. The pursuit ended when the suspect barricaded at a home. The Nicollet County Sheriff's Office then issued a shelter-in-place for residents in the area as law enforcement tried to negotiate a peaceful resolution before multiple shots were fired during this time, striking a St. Peter police officer in the arm, and fatally shooting the suspect. The officer is in stable condition after being airlifted to a hospital.
2026-06-18	Shane Hansen (53)	Unknown	North Las Vegas, Nevada	LVMPD officers attempted to pull over a stolen blue third-generation Hyundai Tucson at the Las Vegas Strip, but the suspect refused and drove away in a high rate of speed. The vehicle went into oncoming traffic multiple times, almost causing collisions throughout the Las Vegas Valley. The pursuit ended in a mobile home's backyard near the Kiel Ranch Historic Site in North Las Vegas, when three male suspects ran from the vehicle. One of the men was armed with a .357 revolver. Officers gave verbal commands for the armed man to drop the firearm. He refused, causing two officers to discharge their firearms, killing the suspect. Both officers were placed on routine paid administrative leave pending the outcome of the department’s review.
2026-06-17	Christopher Stewart (40)	White	Pahrump, Nevada	Nye County deputies responded to a home invasion report and fought a man who was on drugs. Police tased him multiple times but had little effect before eventually taking him into custody. The man was initially transported to a hospital for a minor laceration but suffered a fatal medical episode afterwards.
2026-06-17	unidentified male	Unknown	Lake Tomahawk, Wisconsin	Two Oneida County deputies arrived at a residence to arrest a man regarding a morning felony investigation. Upon making contact with officers, the man discharged a firearm, which drew returning fire from one of the deputies, killing him.
2026-06-17	Daniel Edward Noonan (49)	White	Siletz, Oregon	Newport Police and Oregon State Police attempted to arrest Noonan, who was wanted for yelling racist insults at a Guatemalan fruit seller and destroying her stand. When officers went to arrest him, he allegedly fired at them, and officers killed him in return fire.
2026-06-17	Justin Cann (21)	White	San Diego, California	A San Diego police officer was driving at the campus of University of San Diego with his marked Ford Explorer when he felt an impact while driving down a hill road. When the officer stopped to investigate, he spotted Cann, a USD student from Aurora, Colorado lying on the road in front of his Explorer. Cann was taken by Falck to a nearby hospital where he was pronounced dead.
2026-06-16	Deandrea Robertson (33)	Black	Anchorage, Alaska	Staff at the Old Seward Highway Walmart called police for a report of a man committing retail theft before Walmart staff took him into custody. Almost immediately when three officers made contact with the suspect, he attempted to flee the room. The three officers tackled the suspect to the ground before the man opened fire on the officers tackling him, hitting one officer twice in the lower body and one officer in the chest, which was intercepted by a ballistic plate in the officer's vest. One officer fatally shot the suspect in the chest, killing him. The footage was released.
2026-06-16	Jajuan Bates (35)	Black	South Bend, Indiana	Officers responded to a call for an alleged violation of a late-evening protection order involving a man who was outside of a residence and suffering from mental health issues. After arrival, officers fatally shot the man after attempting multiple methods to stop him at an alley.
2026-06-16	Jason Mathew Moore (48)	White	Miami, Oklahoma	Miami officers were notified of a possible stolen second-generation Jeep Liberty traveling west on the Will Rogers Turnpike from Joplin, Missouri, during the morning hours. As the Jeep crossed the border into Oklahoma, several Miami Officers responded to assist. Officers pulled over the Liberty near the Oklahoma Welcome Center on Interstate 44 at mile marker 313 in Miami. A male driver from Columbia, Missouri, and a female passenger from Willard, Missouri, exited the Jeep and both brandished their firearms towards the officers before both suspects were immediately killed by officers.
2026-06-16	Lexi Lanaye Scheets (35)	White	Miami, Oklahoma	
2026-06-16	Shawn Dewayne Williams (44)	Black	Washington, District of Columbia	MPD Officers responded to a report of a fatal shooting of a woman by a Southeast D.C. man who fled onto a Metrobus in Northwest D.C. Minutes after getting on the bus, officers halted the bus driver, boarded the bus, and evacuated all the passengers. They saw a person fitting the suspect's description before officers approached the suspect, who reached towards a bag, pulled out a pistol, and pointed it at an officer. Two MPD officers fatally shot the suspect, killing the man and damaging the suspect's gun.
2026-06-15	Sandra Keeme (48)	Unknown	Kingman, Arizona	Mohave County deputies responded to a home for domestic violence. Keeme reportedly produced a gun before deputies shot her.
2026-06-15	Airick Iriarte (18)	Hispanic	Sweetwater, Texas	Two Sweetwater officers were in the middle of an early morning routine patrol when an officer's vehicle was struck by gunfire. Both officers located a suspect and exchanged gunfire before fleeing on foot. Officers found him behind a vehicle under a residential carport where additional officers responded to the call, including Nolan County deputies. Both officers exchanged gunfire for a second time, killing the suspect, and were immediately placed on administrative leave afterward.
2026-06-14	Jaden Michaca (15)	Hispanic	Santa Ana, California	Santa Ana Police were called to a home by a 53-year-old who reported that that Michaca, his girlfriend's son, had stabbed him. When officers arrived, Michaca refused to drop a knife, stated he wanted to die, and moved toward the officers, before they shot him. The footage was released.
2026-06-14	Kohen Wiley (1)	Black	Senatobia, Mississippi	SPD officers responded to a shoplifting call at a Route 51 Walmart, and encountered two adults and a child driving away from the store in their vehicle. Footage shows multiple officers opened fire on the vehicle as the vehicle backed up and accelerated, attempting to strike two officers in the way. As a result, infant Kiley was killed in the incident. Police did not know Wiley was in the vehicle before the shooting. One of the adults was also shot and was taken to a nearby hospital. The officer who shot Kiley had resigned from the department. The footage had been released by officials. All of the officers' actions were justified by the Attorney General.
2026-06-13	Jacques L. Whitt (27)	Black	Huntsville, Alabama	A Madison County deputy who was responding to a call with lights and sirens on collided with a vehicle which pulled out from a private property. The passenger of the vehicle died.
2026-06-13	Brandon Garcia (37)	Hispanic	Surprise, Arizona	Garcia fatally shot his 63-year-old father at their home. SPD officers immediately responded to reports of gunfire after a family member, who was not inside the home at the time, called 911, and immediately shot Garcia at the scene after entering the residence. Officers discovered the father afterward.
2026-06-13	Eric Franks (57)	Black	Philadelphia, Pennsylvania	PPD officers responded to reports of a vehicle struck by gunfire in the Wynnefield neighborhood. Police found Franks and they got into an altercation. Franks pulled out a gun and shot three officers, who returned fire, killing him.
2026-06-12	Nicholas Henry Holley (34)	White	Weippe, Idaho	Holley barricaded himself inside a home with a woman after Clearwater County deputies went to serve a search and arrest warrant. Idaho State Police SWAT Team and Crisis Negotiation Team were dispatched to the scene to assist; however, Holley fired at the members multiple times before being struck by returned fire. The woman inside suffered non-life threatening injuries and a SWAT team member was also grazed by a bullet in the helmet.
2026-06-12	Austin Wayne Edwards (28)	Unknown	Ocean Springs, Mississippi	Officers responded to a call regarding an early morning disturbance at the Quality Inn. When officers arrived, they found a Vancleave man armed with a weapon. When asked to put the weapon down, Edwards attempted to come at the officers in a threatening way before officers fatally shot him.
2026-06-12	Jaylyn J. Brown (22)	Black	Milwaukee, Wisconsin	MPD officers responded to an afternoon 911 complaint regarding a man threatening to shoot the 911 caller in the Menomonee River Hills neighborhood. During the 911 call, the suspect attempted to rob the caller. MPD officers saw the suspect armed with a revolver walking away from the scene, and they attempted to stop him. The suspect demanded suicide by cop by yelling "shoot me" at MPD officers, before running away to a nearby apartment complex, where he retreated to a second-floor landing in a common hallway. As officers repeatedly ordered him to drop the revolver, an officer fired at the man but didn't hit him. Officers negotiated with the suspect for an hour. As the officers talked with the suspect, he agreed to accept a bottle of water and a cigar from the officers. He then walked down the stairs to retrieve these items. Less-than-lethal options were used to try to take the suspect into custody but failed. He retreated up the stairs to the landing before two officers fatally shot him. The footage had been released.
2026-06-12	Shawn West Jr. (22)	Black	Faison, North Carolina	Sampson County Sheriff's Office deputies arrived on scene of a call at a Dollar General where a 22-year-old man called 911 for a mental health crisis. Two deputies spotted him armed with a knife before fatally shooting West.
2026-06-11 or 12	Hilton Spokony (45)	White	Patchogue, New York	An off-duty Suffolk County deputy collided a vehicle that just turned left. Spokony, the passenger in that vehicle, died. The footage of the incident had been released. Some news source said the incident occurred on June 11, while the New York State Attorney General stated that it occurred on June 12.
2026-06-11	unidentified male	Unknown	Richmond, Virginia	FBI agents arrived to execute a warrant and attempted to call the suspect out of a ground-floor room. When the man exited, he opened fire, prompting an FBI SWAT officer to return fire and fatally shoot him.
2026-06-11	James U. Glenn (56)	White	Phoenix, Arizona	Officers tracked down a man driving an unidentified SUV who was wanted on sex crimes against a child. As the man arrived at an intersection near the Pinnacle Peak Commerce Center in North Phoenix, a K-9 handler in his truck used a grappler to bring the man's SUV to a stop, while another officer used his vehicle to pin the driver’s side door. The man raised a gun and pointed at them before officers fatally shot him. The footage was released.
2026-06-11	Charles Brandon Costanzo (34)	White	Mansfield, Pennsylvania	Costanzo, of Old Forge, Lackawanna County, Pennsylvania (formerly from Scranton, Jermyn and Dunmore), was the suspect in several robberies in New York. On June 9, Pennsylvania State Police chased a silver Honda CR-V that belongs to Costanzo in Mansfield. Troopers were able to stop the vehicle, which crashed in the area of State Routes 6 and 546 in Richmond Township and Costanzo ran off into a wooded area, where a ground search took place. Two days later, on the morning of June 11, police released a statement that Costanzo was spotted on the grounds of Commonwealth University Mansfield, and was armed with an open pocketknife in his hand. Officers arrived and spotted the man with a knife. He ignored commands to drop the knife while coming towards PSP troopers and a Mansfield University police officer. One PSP trooper fatally shot Costanzo. He died two months and six days before his 35th birthday. According to Scranton Police, Costanzo was previously released from jail after facing a single felony aggravated assault charge and misdemeanor counts of simple assault and disorderly conduct. The report confirms that Costanzo assaulted a hospital worker at the Geisinger Community Medical Center by throwing a plastic tray at a nurse assistant and attempting to hit another nurse before spitting at his face multiple times in December 2024.
2026-06-10	Lloyd Gilmore (44)	Black	Sikeston, Missouri	Gilmore had approached an officer in the parking lot of Sikeston DPS headquarters seeking help, reportedly speaking words the officer could not understand. Gilmore confronted and assaulted the officer before being tased and hog-tied. He continued to act combative but died shortly after.
2026-06-10	Michael Zurek (31)	Black	Ottumwa, Iowa	Members of the U.S. Marshal Service attempted to serve an arrest warrant on Zurek at a residence during the afternoon hours. During the altercation, Zurek pulled out a weapon before officers killed him.
2026-06-10	Xavier Marquez Gray (19)	Black	Midfield, Alabama	Birmingham Police officers were in Midfield attempting to apprehend two suspects wanted on multiple outstanding violent felony warrants. One of the suspects exited the vehicle before an officer shot him dead for reasons unknown.
2026-06-08	unidentified male	Unknown	Baggs, Wyoming	A man was fatally shot by officers during an active shooter event and manhunt that left a Wyoming Highway Patrol vehicle filled with bullet holes and one officer injured who was airlifted by Intermountain Air Ambulance to a hospital in Colorado. The manhunt ended when the suspect opened fire on deputies while driving his unidentified truck, before multiple officers killed him.
2026-06-08	Oliver Haas (58)	Unknown	Glendale, California	Officers responded to an assault with a knife at a residence near Crescenta Valley Community Regional Park. When officers arrived, they found an injured neighbor who responded to officers that the suspect walked out of a nearby home with a knife in his hand. Officers confronted him, but the suspect ran away. They chased him on foot for a short time before the man moved toward them with the knife, causing them to fatally shoot the man.
2026-06-08	Kenneth Lee Grove (49)	Unknown	Olney, Illinois	Richland County Sheriff's Office deputies responded to a domestic disturbance at a residence. During the encounter, Grove didn't comply and was hit by a taser. He died despite life‑saving measures.
2026-06-07	Jonathan Lawrence (30)	Unknown	Hutchinson, Kansas	Two officers responded to a residence to conduct follow-up on a late-evening theft investigation. Upon arrival, a local man, Lawrence, wanted for questioning stepped outside the residence to speak with them. During the encounter, both officers observed that Lawrence was armed with a handgun. As the officers attempted to detain and disarm him, a physical altercation ensued. Lawrence battered both officers before fleeing into the garage of the residence. One officer deployed a taser, which caused Lawrence to fall and drop the handgun. While the second officer attempted to gain control of Lawrence, Lawrence reached for and regained control of the firearm. The officer who deployed the taser, drew a service weapon, and fired multiple rounds, striking Lawrence. He was taken to a nearby hospital where he died a short time afterward.
2026-06-07	John Troy Lee (58)	White	Rapid City, South Dakota	Officers respond to a shooting at Central States Fairgrounds where they found a man that had been shot by the suspect, and was transported to a nearby hospital. Witnesses identified the suspect as a local man who had been trying to find him ever since the shooting started. Officers informed that the man was heading toward the Pine Ridge Indian Reservation, and following a search and coordinated law enforcement response, Lee was located in the southwest portion of the reservation by officers from the Oglala Sioux Tribe Department of Public Safety. The man immediately opened fire on officers, wounding one officer, before being killed by officers.
2026-06-07	Jeffrey Scott DeJesus (58)	Black	Upper Allen Township, Pennsylvania	Officers responded to a report of shots fired at a home. After arrival, a Mechanicsburg man opened fire at deputies. Officers returned fire, killing him.
2026-06-07	Neil Japhet (23)	Native American	Bethel, Alaska	BPD responded to a domestic disturbance at a home involving a gun shortly after midnight. When officers arrived, they saw the man brandishing a shotgun, before they fatally shot him.
2026-06-06	Josh Ryan Trumble (32)	White	Austin, Texas	APD officers responded to a residence regarding a shirtless man bleeding and behaving erratically after separate calls at different time. The man, Trumble, was found with lacerations and officers tried to de-escalate the situation. Trumble initially complied to the arrest but later pushed toward an officer, leading another to tase him. Trumble became unresponsive and died. Investigators also linked Trumble to a burglary at a nearby home before the incident. The footage was released.
2026-06-06	Christian Strassburg (35)	White	Oregon, Ohio	In St. Charles Hospital Emergency Room parking lot, a Mercy Health officer reponded to a distubance between Strassburg and his spouse. During the encounter, Strassburg continued to agressively approach the officer with a pen, which the officer mistakened for a knife. The officer shot him in response. On October 9, 2026, the Lucas County grand jury declined to charge the officer, finding no further investigation was needed. The footage was released.
2026-06-06	Jenry Guadalupe Custodio Casimiro (44)	Hispanic	Carpentersville, Illinois	Carpentersville officers and Illinois State Police troopers respond to a midnight shots fired call that started as a disturbance at a bar near Illinois Route 25. A Carpentersville officer witnessed a man actively shooting a person, who was later reported as a well-known person to the suspect, before the officer fatally shot the suspect. Two victims were transported to nearby hospitals, with one in critical condition.
2026-06-05	unidentified male	Unknown	Klamath Falls, Oregon	Officers responded to a fight at a residence, where they saw an armed man fighting before officers fatally shot him. A 4-year-old child was also injured.
2026-06-05	Gregory Hill Jr. (43)	Unknown	Smyrna, Georgia	A Cobb County deputy pulled over a black second-generation Cadillac SRX for reckless driving in the far northwest side of Smyrna. He immediately fled from police and subsequently lost control of his vehicle again as it overturned near a home. Overturned on its side, he remained in his Cadillac and refused to exit. He discharged a weapon, which resulted in some of the officers discharging their service weapons. As officers tried to resolve the situation safely, the man attempted to exit his vehicle with the firearm, but officers fatally shot him back.
2026-06-05	David Vernon Milton (70)	White	Pelzer, South Carolina	An Anderson County deputy received a call from a family member regarding a welfare check at a residence for a local man. Upon arriving at the scene, the deputy attempted to deescalate the situation. The man attempted to stab the deputy with a screwdriver, prompting the deputy to fatally shoot the man in the chest.
2026-06-05	Ricardo Leon (42)	Hispanic	Fresno, California	A family in southeast Fresno called the police regarding a disturbance involving the son who was armed with a gun. FPD arrived and tried to de-escalate the situation for about half an hour before the man raised the gun at officers. They subsequently shot him. Police released the footage.
2026-06-05	Thomas Hearn (46)	Black	Los Angeles, California	Just north of LAX, a man assaulted another man with a 9mm semi-automatic Polymer80 handgun at a 7-Eleven store in the Westchester neighborhood, and stole his glasses during the assault. The man called 911 and provided location information to LAPD. The suspect refused to get out of his vehicle, and sped away leading to a short chase northbound on Interstate 405. After the chase, the suspect exited the vehicle. He was armed with a gun and refused to comply before officers fired at him, killing him. The footage was released.
2026-06-04	Shane Harlan (39)	White	Waterford, California	Stanislaus County deputies responded to a family disturbance and attempted to arrest Harlan for vandalism. Harlan resisted, leading to a fight. Deputies later applied full-body restraint device on Harlan before noticing that he lost consciousness. He died as a result.
2026-06-04	Joshua Smith (35)	Black	Eureka, Missouri	During an evening domestic disturbance investigation in the Windswept Farms subdivision, a man exchanged gunfire with EPD officers. Officers shot and killed him.
2026-06-04	Lorenzo Miller (39)	Black	West Chester Township, Butler County, Ohio	Officers responded to a report of a woman screaming for help from inside an apartment. Upon arrival, officers became concerned for the safety of the woman and anyone else who may be inside the apartment and went in to make sure everyone was OK. During a protective search of the residence, officers encountered a man who was holding a knife against a woman's neck inside a bathroom. An officer fired a single shot, killing him. The footage was released.
2026-06-04	Qwa'Maurie Deaver (18)	Black	Pontiac, South Carolina	Richland County deputies responded to a report of a shooting in the Woodhill Estates neighborhood in Columbia. Despite nobody injured, one home and several vehicles were struck by gunfire. Less than two hours later, Richland deputies responded again to another shooting in unincorporated Pontiac. The track led deputies to the backyard of a home a few streets away where they saw several people outside. The suspects began firing at deputies with "high-powered rifles and pistols" causing a wild shootout. Deputies began returning fire and tried getting to cover, all while the suspects continued shooting. One of the suspects was fatally shot by police, while another was detained by police. The footage was released by police.
2026-06-04	unidentified male (64)	Unknown	Ogden, Utah	Officers discovered two men fighting in an active struggle, with one of the man appearing to be armed with a knife. The armed man stabbed the other man multiple times before one officer fatally shot the suspect. The victim of the stabbing was transported to the hospital in critical but stable condition.
2026-06-04	unidentified male	Unknown	Palm Springs, California	Officers responded to an accident. After arrival, they encountered a man who was allegedly acting erratically and was armed with a knife. They used less-lethal options before officers fatally shot the man.
2026-06-03	Rosalia Hodges (59)	White	Doctor Phillips, Florida	Orange County deputies received a call about a screaming woman. Upon arrival, they knocked on a door before Hodges showed up armed with a large knife and advanced toward them. The deputies fired and killed her.
2026-06-03	Jalen Dior Green (29)	Black	Pittsburg, Kansas	An officer spotted a local man acting erratically on the sidewalk outside the Pittsburg Public Library. When the officer attempted to approach the man, he removed his clothes, and began running alongside the officer's patrol car. As the officer attempted to arrest him, the man resisted and a physical fight began. The officer deployed a taser, but it did not subdue him. During the struggle, Green grabbed the officer's flashlight and hit the officer in the head with it. As another officer arrived on-scene, he approached and attempted to help. The flashlight was dropped, but after he grabbed the flashlight off the ground, he raised it toward the officer before the officer fired multiple shots at him, killing him.
2026-06-03	Sergio Flores (43)	Unknown	Sunrise Manor, Nevada	LVMPD officers received multiple reports of a man opening fire on passing vehicles at the intersection of North Sloan Lane and East Lake Mead Boulevard during the afternoon hours. Officers located the man armed with a gun at the intersection. The man refused officers’ commands to drop the gun, pointed his firearm at them and fired a shot toward officers. Officers returned fire, striking the suspect.
2026-06-03	Yves Venne (74)	White	Rock Hill, South Carolina	Venne was fatally shot by officers from York County Sheriff's Office Internet Crimes Against Children Unit and the York County Multi-Agency Drug Enforcement Unit while serving an afternoon warrant at the Sycamore Apartments. Police said Venne was holding a tire iron.
2026-06-03	Anthony Scott Searles-Harris (41)	White	Bakersfield, California	2026 Bakersfield hostage crisis: An Oildale, California man, who had been released early from prison following 2012 sex crimes, on the afternoon of June 2, entered a Chase Bank in downtown Bakersfield, and barricaded himself with two hostages following a bomb threat, prompting evacuations and a law enforcement response involving the FBI, ATF, DHS, Bakersfield Police Department and the Kern County Sheriff's Office along with SWAT team members. The two hostages were released safely nine hours later, continuing the standoff with the man only until five hours later when SWAT officers breached through the bank shortly after midnight. The suspect opened fire on them, before the SWAT team fired back, killing him.
2026-06-03	Isawan Foster (33)	Black	Columbus, Ohio	Officers responded to a domestic disturbance call at a residence in the Old Oaks neighborhood located across the street from the Nationwide Children's Hospital. Police arrived five minutes later, and the suspect began opening fire at his home before officers fatally shot him.
2026-06-02	unidentified male	Unknown	Odessa, Texas	During a welfare check, Odessa officers were speaking with a man at a home when he ran from the house while armed with a brick. Officers tased him before taking him into custody. He was handcuffed and placed into a cruiser before became unresponsive and died at a hospital.
2026-06-02	Donald Gardner (52)	White	Atlantic City, New Jersey	SWAT team members were attempting to serve a search warrant on Gardner. When they breached the door of the home, Gardner, who was paralyzed after a police shooting in 2013, shot and wounded two members on scene. A member returned fire and killed him. The footage was released.
2026-06-02	Matthew Strain (55)	White	Omaha, Nebraska	Police were called to assist with an eviction near Armbrust Acres, which escalated into an armed stand-off. A SWAT team broke an upstairs window, after which the man allegedly started shooting at officers with a rifle. Police shot and killed the man. A witness told KETV that the man had a high-capacity rifle, repeatedly talked about having 2,300 rounds, and saying that he's preparing himself for violence.
2026-06-01	Austin D. Mark (44)	White	Johnston, Iowa	Officers were just getting started to serve a warrant and conduct a mental health pickup at a residence when it turned into a standoff when Mark ran into a garage and barricaded himself inside. They cleared the area and spent time attempting to negotiate with the man and convince him to come out peacefully but failed. After attempting to convince Mark, officers decided to breach the garage, before Mark opened fire on the officers, striking one Polk County deputy in the hand, and Mark lighting the garage on fire. Officers quickly extinguished the fire and discovered Mark dead at the scene. It was confirmed by authorities that one officer fatally shot Mark.
2026-06-01	John Gabriel Mendoza Jr. (18)	Hispanic	Lake Jackson, Texas	A Brazoria deputy attempted to pull over a black Dodge Challenger driven by a Clute man who sped off seconds later. The pursuit, that took place after midnight, ended in Lake Jackson after Mendoza drove into his father's garage. As the deputy encountered Mendoza, the deputy fired his gun, killing Mendoza. Attorneys for Mendoza's family said he and his three friends were unarmed.

== See also ==
- Death in custody § United States
- Henry A. Wallace Police Crime Public Database
- List of cases of police brutality
- List of countries with annual rates and counts for killings by law enforcement officers
- List of law enforcement officers killed in the line of duty in the United States
- List of law enforcement officers convicted for an on-duty killing in the United States
- List of shootings by US immigration agents
- List of police reforms related to the George Floyd protests
- List of unarmed African Americans killed by law enforcement officers in the United States
- Lists of killings by law enforcement officers
- Police brutality in the United States
- Police misconduct § United States
- Police riot § United States
- Police use of deadly force in the United States
