= List of killings by law enforcement officers in the United States, May 2010 =

This is a list of people reported killed by non-military law enforcement officers in the United States in May 2010, whether in the line of duty or not, and regardless of reason or method. The listing documents the occurrence of a death, making no implications regarding wrongdoing or justification on the part of the person killed or officer involved. Killings are arranged by date of the incident that caused death. Different death dates, if known, are noted in the description. The table below lists 33 people.

== May 2010 ==
Date	Name (Age) of Deceased	State (city)	Description
2010-05-29	Jessie Cooper (28)	Florida (Jacksonville)	
2010-05-28	Michael Welch (20)	California (Pinole)	Officers shot and killed the 20-year-old parolee, suspected of being involved in a shooting earlier that day, because they thought he was reaching for a gun. Police had ordered him to raise his arms, but instead he reached for his waist. It later turned out to be a black cell phone.
2010-05-27	Jose Flores (19)	California (Los Angeles)	Two gang unit officers responding to a call tried to stop Flores, said a Los Angeles Police Department spokesperson. Officers saw a handgun in the man's hand, and he refused to drop the weapon, according to LAPD. "That's when the officer-involved shooting took place," the spokesperson said. It's believed Flores was in the middle of an alleged drug deal before he was approached by police, according to KTLA. Police said Flores was a known gang member and parolee.
2010-05-27	Oscar Morales (21)	California (Los Angeles)	Oscar Morales, a 21-year-old Latino, was shot and killed by Los Angeles police Thursday, May 27, according to Los Angeles County coroner's records. Officers responded to "a call for service involving a man with a history of suicide threats", according to an LAPD news release. When officers arrived, family members directed them to Morales. The officers approached Morales, who they described as initially cooperative. According to the LAPD account, he then suddenly grabbed a fireplace poker and came at them, allegedly refusing to drop the poker. At that point an officer opened fire on Morales.
2010-05-27	Abraham Dickan (79)	New York (New York Mills)	Dickan walked into an AT&T cellular phone store with a .357 magnum in his hand, and shot Seth Turk. Off-duty Rome, New York police officer Donald J. Moore, who was in the store as a customer at the time of the shooting and was carrying his own .40 caliber handgun, fatally shot Dickan.
2010-05-27	Anthony Bernard Bass (24)	South Carolina (Beaufort)	Officers approached Bass to question him when he suddenly pulled a weapon and opened fire on the officers. The officers returned fire and continued to exchange fire with the suspect as they chased him down the street into a yard.
2010-05-27	Carl D. Johnson (48)	Maryland (Baltimore)	Johnson was driving home from bible study when he went into diabetic shock and began driving on the shoulder. Police arrived on the scene in response to 9-1-1 calls of other drivers. According to officers, Johnson "did not cooperate" with them as they approached his vehicle. Officers responded by spraying Johnson with pepper spray, striking him with their batons, tasing him twice, and punching him in the face, before handcuffing him. Johnson went into cardiac arrest and died one hour later.
2010-05-24	Andrew Caprio (42)	California (Los Angeles)	Caprio was described as driving erratically and committing several traffic violations. Police attempted to make a traffic stop but Caprio would not pull over. He then led the officers on a pursuit which ended with his crashing into a guard rail, center divider and another vehicle. Police said Caprio emerged from his vehicle holding a large knife, allegedly attacking one of the officers. At least two officers opened fire on Caprio.
2010-05-22	John Jessie Soliz, III (19)	California (Bakersfield)	Soliz was found, armed with a rifle, in the backyard of an apartment to which police had responded to a report of shots fired. Bakersfield Police Department Officer Timothy Berchtold told Soliz to show his hands. Soliz pointed the rifle at Berchtold who fired his AR-15 several times, killing Soliz.
2010-05-20	Alfred Pouliot (27)	California (Covina)	Pouliot was wanted for a series of violent crimes, according to the Sheriff's Department. Covina, California police officers located him at a hotel on May 20. They set up a surveillance operation and observed him leave and enter a white pickup truck. Pouliot saw the officers in their vehicle and, according to the Sheriff's Department, intentionally rammed his truck into the officers' vehicle. Pouliot then stepped out of the truck and allegedly pointed a handgun at the two officers. At that point, at least one officer shot Pouliot several times.
2010-05-20	Nathan Manning (31)	California (San Diego)	Nathan Manning of North Park died Thursday after he and a roommate engaged in a violent fight. A San Diego Police Department detective was unable to calm Manning down and the two ended up wrestling on the ground, witnesses said. The detective pulled out his gun and fired once. Noah Manning said his brother was unarmed at the time of the shooting.
2010-05-20	Jerry Kane, Jr. (45)	Arkansas (North Little Rock)	Jerry Kane Jr., 45, of Forest, Ohio, and his son Joseph Kane, believed to be 16, were killed during an exchange of gunfire with officers in a Walmart parking lot, Arkansas State Police said Friday. The shootings came about 90 minutes after West Memphis, Tennessee police Sgt. Brandon Paudert, 39, and Officer Bill Evans, 38, were attacked with AK-47 assault rifles after they stopped a minivan on Interstate 40 in West Memphis on Thursday, authorities said.
2010-05-20	Joseph Kane (16)	Arkansas (North Little Rock)	Jerry Kane Jr., 45, of Forest, Ohio, and his son Joseph Kane, believed to be 16, were killed during an exchange of gunfire with officers in a Walmart parking lot, Arkansas State Police said Friday. The shootings came about 90 minutes after West Memphis, Tennessee police Sgt. Brandon Paudert, 39, and Officer Bill Evans, 38, were attacked with AK-47 assault rifles after they stopped a minivan on Interstate 40 in West Memphis on Thursday, authorities said.
2010-05-20	Victoria Helen Roger-Vasseli (67)	California (Yuba City)	Roger-Vasselin came to the door with a shotgun. ... "These two officers are standing in the path of this female, who is advancing toward them with a shotgun pointed at them. They repeatedly ordered her to put the gun down, and when she did not comply with those orders, it left them no other alternatives but to shoot." Pavey said Roger-Vasselin was pronounced dead at the scene.
2010-05-19	Ronald Bullock (61)	Florida (Tampa)	
2010-05-17	Jose Vieira (21)	Texas (Fort Worth)	Vieira called 911 about 5 a.m. Monday, stating he was suicidal and armed with a large-caliber gun... Police said two of the four officers opened fire after Vieira emerged partially from the vehicle then lunged back inside for what they believed was a gun. Vieira, who died from a gunshot wound to the chest, was pronounced dead at the scene.
2010-05-17	Melvin Williams (33)	Georgia (East Dublin)	Shot after fighting with police officer. Williams' vehicle was pulled over for unspecified reasons.
2010-05-17	Craig Spitz (42)	Florida (Bonita Springs)	
2010-05-16	Aiyana Mo'Nay Stanley-Jones (7)	Michigan (Detroit)	A member of an elite Detroit Police Department team failed to follow his training when he stormed a house looking for a murder suspect with his finger on the trigger and shot a 7-year-old girl who was asleep on the couch, a prosecutor said ... All sides acknowledge that Aiyana Stanley-Jones’ death was not intentional. But prosecutors say Officer Joseph Weekley's actions in 2010 were a crime because he handled his submachine gun in a reckless manner.
2010-05-14	Monty Edward Multanen (70)	Washington (Tacoma)	Shot by son-in-law and off-duty deputy Allen Myron who then killed himself.
2010-05-14	Sue Multanen (69)	Washington (Tacoma)	Shot by son-in-law and off-duty deputy Allen Myron who then killed himself.
2010-05-14	Vincent Matthew Yzaguirre (20)	California (Bakersfield)	Yzaguirre was the driver of a stolen car stopped by two Bakersfield Police officers. When he backed up into the patrol vehicle, Officers Timothy Berchtold and Jason Felgenhauer fired multiple times, killing him.
2010-05-13	William Keith White (50)	Texas (Sulphur Springs)	Officers were called to White's residence for a welfare check, during which the situation worsened. Eventually the officers were shot at by White, and fire was returned in response, fatally injuring White
2010-05-12	Keaton Dupree Otis (25)	Oregon (Portland)	Shot after shooting at and wounding police officer during traffic stop. Use of Taser was ineffective.
2010-05-10	Darryl Ellis (44)	Illinois (Chicago)	An off-duty Chicago Police Department officer shot and killed a man who authorities said tried breaking into the apartment building owned by the officer. Darryl Ellis, 44, died Monday after he was shot multiple times. Police say Ellis swung a tire iron at the officer after the officer caught him trying to force his way inside.
2010-05-10	Donovan Morris (35)	California (Los Angeles)	While holding a handgun, Morris exited the car and turned toward police, according to authorities. At that point, an officer fired at Morris, fatally wounding him. Earlier in the day Morris had shot and killed his wife, Ivy Bodkins, 29.
2010-05-07	Rasheed Cherry (18)	New Jersey (Bloomfield)	Cherry, a suspect who allegedly fired several rounds into a crowd of 1,500 carnival attendees, was shot by a police officer and later died from his wound, authorities said.
2010-05-07	Genaro Mercado (36)	Arizona (Phoenix)	Officers caught up with the Mustang and conducted a high risk traffic stop. After stopping, police said, Gemaro Mercado, 36, left the car and came toward officers, shooting at them with a hand gun. Four officers fired back and killed Mercado.
2010-05-05	Phillip V. Ware, Jr. (18)	Ohio (Shaker Heights)	Officers responded to a complaint that a man was breaking into cars. When police arrived, the suspect ran. He cut through yards and ran toward Fernway Road. Police said he pulled out a gun during the chase. An officer shot the suspect.
2010-05-03	Carlos Sierra (41)	Florida (Hialeah)	
2010-05-03	Jason Medina (26)	Texas (San Antonio)	Gary Mucho, a 12-year veteran of the department, shot Medina once during an arrest attempt after he allegedly refused to obey orders to turn off a car and, police said, attempted to put the car in gear, endangering another officer standing in front of the vehicle.
2010-05-01	Jason John Jones (21)	Minnesota (St. Paul)	Jones, a co-suspect in the fatal shooting of a police officer earlier that morning, as well as an armed car jacking prior to that, struck another officer repeatedly in the face with a heavy blunt object. The officer fell down and the man straddled him. The officer was able to get up. He shot the suspect, who died.
2010-05-01	Dumone D. Starks (22)	Missouri (Springfield)	Police say an officer arrested the driver (DWI) and asked three other passengers to get out of the car, including 22-year-old Dumone D. Starks. Starks ran and an officer chased him. Starks then loaded and pointed a gun at police. When Starks refused to drop the weapon, the officer shot and killed the suspect.

== See also ==
- Death in custody § United States
- Henry A. Wallace Police Crime Public Database
- List of cases of police brutality
- List of countries with annual rates and counts for killings by law enforcement officers
- List of law enforcement officers killed in the line of duty in the United States
- List of law enforcement officers convicted for an on-duty killing in the United States
- List of police reforms related to the George Floyd protests
- List of unarmed African Americans killed by law enforcement officers in the United States
- Lists of killings by law enforcement officers
- Police brutality in the United States
- Police misconduct § United States
- Police riot § United States
- Police use of deadly force in the United States
