= List of killings by law enforcement officers in the United States, January 2013 =

This is a list of people reported killed by non-military law enforcement officers in the United States in January 2013, whether in the line of duty or not, and regardless of reason or method. The listing documents the occurrence of a death, making no implications regarding wrongdoing or justification on the part of the person killed or officer involved. Killings are arranged by date of the incident that caused death. Different death dates, if known, are noted in the description. The table below lists 106 people.

== January 2013 ==
Date	Name (Age) of Deceased	Race	State (City)	Description
2013-01-31	Dexter Lee Fair (20)	Black	Alabama (Harvest)	
2013-01-30	Ronette Morales (30)	Hispanic	Colorado (Denver)	Two plain clothes officers attempted to arrest Morales for charges of burglary, assault and harassment. Morales shot one officer in the hand and was subsequently fatally shot.
2013-01-30	Josue Jimenez (33)	Hispanic	California (Fillmore)	
2013-01-29	Cody Loron (31)	White	Texas (Fort Worth)	Officers responded to a police report that a fugitive was behind a building they happened to be at. Upon discovering the suspect, he opened fire wounding an officer. The officers returned fire, fatally wounding the suspect.
2013-01-29	Jeremy Gregory (31)	Unknown	Alabama (Jackson County)	
2013-01-29	Angie Hall (32)	White	North Carolina (Hickory)	
2013-01-29	William Perneau (29)	White	Oklahoma (Pryor Creek)	
2013-01-28	Randall Davis (51)	White	California (Fresno)	
2013-01-28	Ishmael Muhammad (29)	Black	Pennsylvania (Harrisburg)	Officers responded to a report that Muhammed had assaulted his girlfriend. He barricaded himself inside the apartment and using a machete kept a 2-year-old and a disabled 26-year-old as hostages. Officials report that Muhammad "was obviously under the influence of some drugs." After a standoff of a few hours he was fatally shot twice when his waving of the machete prompted officers to fear for the lives of the hostages.
2013-01-28	Schroeder, Thomas E (50)	White	Missouri (Craig)	Missouri Highway Patrol Trooper stopped a vehicle on Interstate 29 for speed. After noticing an odor of alcohol, Trooper began asking about DUI and the driver tried to flee. During a struggle, subject was pepper sprayed and when not subdued and still struggling, he was shot fatally.
2013-01-28	Harris, Anthony (38)	Black	Florida (Jacksonville)	Responding to a call for a domestic dispute, officers encountered the subject who tried to take one officer's weapon. During the struggle, he was killed by the second officer.
2013-01-27	Anderson, James D (32)	Black	Washington (Seattle)	Subject was ejected from a club, after which he returned and shot two people, including his girlfriend. When responding officers contacted him as he was leaving, shots were exchanged and subject was killed.
2013-01-27	Culpepper, Brandon (30)	Black	Illinois (Homewood)	Police were called to an apartment building for a disturbance. On arrival, there was a confrontation with the subject who was shot by officers.
2013-01-27	Thayer, Paul Gordon (49)	White	Florida (Pensacola)	
2013-01-25	Combs, Douglas (16)	White	Washington (Vancouver)	Authorities with Vancouver Police and Clark County Sheriff's Office were investigating a home invasion shooting that injured one and two armed robberies from earlier that day when they confronted Douglas E. Combs and another 16-year-old near East 19th Street and E Street in Vancouver. Officers believe Combs is the primary suspect in the three crimes. After attempting contact with the two 16-year-olds, police say an officer shot Combs. Officers said Combs had been armed at the time of the shooting, and was pronounced dead at the scene.
2013-01-25	Brown, James (41)	Black	Maryland (Baltimore)	Authorities said two officers who are part of a gun and drug enforcement group in that area approached a group of people. One of those men started walking in the opposite direction, and when one of the officers tried to approach him, the man turned and started shooting at the officer, police said. Investigators said the officer chased the man on foot for six blocks while the man continued to fire shots at the officer. Officials said the officer eventually returned fire and shot the man, who later died at a hospital.
2013-01-25	Davis, Willie Jr (23)	Black	Arizona (Tucson)	An officer responded to a report of an armed robbery. A suspect matching the description was chased in a vehicle until the suspect crashed. An altercation ensued during which the officer fatally shot the suspect.
2013-01-25	Isidoro Resendez (32)	Hispanic	Texas (Houston)	
2013-01-24	Nijza Lamar Hagans (22)	Black	North Carolina (Fayetteville)	
2013-01-24	Barbara Lassere (60)	Black	Louisiana (LaPlace)	
2013-01-24	Grassley, Jabob (34)	White	Michigan (Kalamazoo)	Grassley was killed when Sergeant Sean Gordon shot him twice in the back at a Best Western hotel. Police had lodged his girlfriend and daughter there after a domestic abuse complaint, but the girlfriend told him where they were. Grassley had a handgun in the car, but was not armed when Gordon shot him. This shooting was ruled justified on May 24, 2013.
2013-01-24	Hatcher, Jordan (22)	White	Texas (Grand Prairie)	Grand Prairie, Texas, police responded to a felony theft call around 3:50 p.m. at the Target store at Camp Wisdom Road and State Highway 360, police said. One of the suspects fled on foot and crossed city lines into Arlington, according to Arlington police spokesman Sgt. Christopher Cook. During the chase, the man ran across a freeway and into a parking lot at the Tarrant County College Southeast Campus. The man got into a physical altercation with police that ended when a Grand Prairie officer shot him, Cook said.
2013-01-23	James Eric Griffin (48)	Black	Texas (Alto)	
2013-01-22	Daniel Rey (33)	White	New Mexico (Farmington)	
2013-01-22	Kathryn Walters (46)	White	Nevada (Boulder City)	Killed along with her son during a domestic dispute incident by her husband who was a Las Vegas Metropolitan Police Department Lieutenant. Subject then set fire to the house, called 911 and waited for officers to arrive after which he stepped inside and shot himself.
2013-01-22	Maximillian Walters (5)	White	Nevada (Boulder City)	Killed along with his mother during a domestic dispute incident by his father who was a Las Vegas Police Lieutenant. Subject then set fire to the house, called 911 and waited for officers to arrive after which he stepped inside and shot himself.
2013-01-22	Craig Bondo(20)	White	Colorado (Woodland Park)	Officers pulled over a suspected stolen vehicle. When the officers attempted to detain the suspect, he drove away, hitting one of the officers with the vehicle. An officer opened fire on the vehicle, fatally wounding the suspect. A witness reports hearing five shots and that the back window of the vehicle was shattered.
2013-01-21	Ray Hayes (50)	Black	Louisiana (Addis)	Officers responded to a report of robbery in progress at a store. The suspect took a customer hostage at gunpoint and stole a police cruiser. The suspect crashed the cruiser at a police roadblock. As officers approached the vehicle, the suspect threatened to kill the hostage and himself. An officer fired three times, killing the suspect.
2013-01-21	Alfredo Emilio Villarreal (18)	Hispanic	Wisconsin (Elkhorn)	
2013-01-19	Donovan Thomas (22)	Black	Missouri (St. Louis)	
2013-01-18	Cody M. Kincheloe (21)	White	Kansas (Olathe)	
2013-01-18	Anthony Brown (50)	White	Alabama (Oxford)	Officers responded to a report of a burglary suspect with several arrest warrants who was spotted in a store. When the officers asked the suspect to step outside, the suspect produced a knife and began slashing at the officers. A Taser was ineffective and the officers fatally shot the suspect when he charged at them.
2013-01-18	Jesse J. France (28)	White	Washington (Vancouver)	Members of a U.S. Marshals Fugitive Task Force shot Mr. France through the windshield of his car after he "escalated the situation" when the marshals located him. One witness claimed Mr. France's face "was kind of blown off."
2013-01-18	Jayvis Benjamin (20)	Black	Georgia (Avondale Estates)	
2013-01-18	George Walter Rosenberg (41)	White	California (Coarsegold)	
2013-01-18	Reginald Lamont "Deucey" Epps (38)	Black	North Carolina (Roanoke Rapids)	
2013-01-17	Eric Ramsey (30)	White	Michigan (Mount Pleasant)	Officers were searching for Ramsey as the prime suspect in a recent abduction, rape and arson. Ramsey rammed his vehicle into a squad car and fled in a stolen garbage truck. He was fatally shot by a sheriff's deputy.
2013-01-17	Angel Lopez (27)	Hispanic	California (San Diego)	Officers surrounded an apartment complex after receiving a report that two wanted parolees were there and at least one was armed. After several hours the men fled and one was cornered. One was fatally shot after refusing to show his hands and reaching into his pockets. The other suspect was arrested after an hours-long search.
2013-01-17	Samuel Gonzales (44)	Hispanic	California (Tulare)	
2013-01-17	Lloyd Hodgson Tschohl (83)	White	Minnesota (Mankato)	
2013-01-16	Gamble, Karvis (19)	Black	Florida (Orlando)	Gamble was shot in the stomach after drug-enforcement officers said someone in the building reached for a gun. Witnesses dispute the police account. Police non-fatally shot another man, Cardaryl Wilson (25), who did not have a weapon. Wilson was wearing an arm splint and couldn't raise his hands as police demanded.
2013-01-16	Cody Shobe (21)	White	Arizona (Buckeye)	An officer fatally shot a man after he shot at police.
2013-01-16	Allen Eugene Ott (48)	White	Georgia (Calhoun)	
2013-01-16	John Montoya (38)	Hispanic	Colorado (Denver)	
2013-01-16	Cody Gene Criner (27)	White	Arizona (Phoenix)	
2013-01-15	Dustin Patrick Wernli (30)	White	Arizona (Tucson)	
2013-01-15	Weber, Todd S (38)	White	Missouri (Kansas City)	Officers attempted to stop Weber's vehicle. Weber led officers on a low-speed chase at no faster than 35 mph. Stop sticks slowed the vehicle, but it continued for several miles. Weber eventually stopped, exited his vehicle, pointed a gun at officers and began firing. Officers returned fire, killing him.
2013-01-15	Gordon, Gregory (22)	White	Hawaii (Honolulu)	Officers responded to a truck driving fast the wrong way. Police fired multiple times when the driver rammed five marked police cruisers. The deceased suspect was a U.S. Army soldier at Schofield Barracks.
2013-01-15	Jimmy Ray Phea (35)	Unknown	California (Fresno)	An officer attempted to stop a pedestrian suspected of being a wanted parolee. The suspect fled, jumped several fences, then confronted the officer with a knife. After a short fight, the officer stepped back and shot twice, fatally wounding the suspect. Later identified as Jimmy Ray Phea
2013-01-14	Roberts, Karlando (32)	Black	New Jersey (East Orange)	Officers responded to a report of a stabbing in progress. Roberts was found to be stabbing his father-in-law and refused to drop the knife. Officers shot Roberts who died at a local hospital.
2013-01-14	Swilling, Wesley (31)	White	South Carolina (Greenville)	Swilling was in the Law Enforcement Center parking lot and approached an officer and deputy in a "threatening manner" with what appeared to be a weapon. Fearing for their safety, they both shot at Swilling, hitting him at least once. Swilling fell down, but continued to approach them, so they took cover behind a vehicle and both fired again, hitting him at least once more. Swilling was pronounced dead at the scene. After further investigation, it was revealed that Swilling was "armed" with a hot glue gun.
2013-01-14	Askew, Steven (24)	Black	Tennessee (Memphis)	Officers responded to a report of loud music. They found a man slumped over inside a vehicle. As officers approached him, he pointed a gun at them and they fatally shot him.
2013-01-14	Robert Alan Penning (45)	White	Colorado (Thornton)	
2013-01-13	Robert Guzman (50)	Hispanic	California (Santa Maria)	
2013-01-13	Frankie Pitt (45)	Black	Virginia (Midlothian)	
2013-01-13	Dushine James Smith (41)	Black	California (Corona)	
2013-01-13	Quintine Barksdale (43)	Black	Arizona (Phoenix)	
2013-01-13	Greer, Christopher (40 or 49)	White	Florida (Indialantic)	
2013-01-13	Gilbert S. Owens	Unknown race	Missouri (Senath)	
2013-01-12	Howard Edward Nevels (33)	White	Alabama (Smiths Station)	
2013-01-12	Jason Dillon (31)	White	West Virginia (Bluefield)	
2013-01-12	Vasquez, Johnathan (21)	Hispanic	California (San Diego)	Officers attempted to stop a vehicle for speeding. A high speed pursuit ensued. After the suspect drove into a vacant lot, he U-turned and drove towards the officers. The officers opened fire, fatally wounding the driver and injuring a passenger.
2013-01-12	Saylor, Robert E. (26)	White	Maryland (Frederick)	Three off-duty officers moonlighting as security guards confronted Saylor, a man with Down syndrome, when he refused to leave the theater after a movie. He was handcuffed when, according to police, he became "medically distressed." His death was ruled homicide by asphyxia due to officers sitting on his chest while subduing him.
2013-01-11	Moretz, Chad (34)	White	Georgia (Savannah)	Officers approached Moretz at his home to question him about a missing man who was a friend of his. A standoff ensued which ended when Moretz walked out of his house with a rifle in hand and was fatally shot by a SWAT sniper. The dismembered remains of the friend were found in the house.
2013-01-11	Binh Van Nguyen (39)	Asian	California (Santa Ana)	Officers on patrol attempted to speak to a suspicious person in the back seat of a car. The suspect jumped into the front seat and drove towards the officers who then fatally shot him.
2013-01-11	Michael W. Daniel (25)	Black	Arizona (Little Rock)	
2013-01-11	Donald Moore (67)	White	Tennessee (Memphis)	
2013-01-10	Daniel Alain Vail (19)	White	Maryland (Mount Airy)	
2013-01-10	Dempsey, John Edward (37)	White	West Virginia (Logan)	Officers pursued Dempsey as the prime suspect in a recent murder and carjacking. Dempsey was fatally shot after "pulling a gun on troopers".
2013-01-10	Ozeir, Rabih (18)	Unknown	Oklahoma (Cushing)	Officers responded to a gym after an employee reported Ozeir confronted gym staff. When officers arrived, they report Ozeir confronted them with a handgun and refused commands to put it down. The officers shot Ozeir who died in a hospital the next day.
2013-01-09	Simons, Kelly Fay (38)	White	Utah (Salt Lake City)	Shot and killed by police after allegedly driving toward a JCAT (Joint Criminal Apprehension Team) officer. Police say she was a suspect in a series of robberies. Miss Simons was unarmed, there was no warrant, and had no criminal record.
2013-01-09	Gary, Robert (31)	Black	Florida (Tampa)	Gary was shot by undercover officers buying crack cocaine.
2013-01-09	Davis, Linda (60)	Black	Florida (Tamarac)	
2013-01-08	Falconi, Angella (24)	White	Florida (Palm Beach)	Officers responded to a report of a domestic disturbance. They found a woman holding a knife to the throat of her boyfriend. The officers shot her when she refused commands to drop the knife and "turned to stab him." She died from her injuries.
2013-01-08	Orta, Josef (24)		Florida (Lake Worth)	
2013-01-08	Donald Keith Miller Sr. (54)	White	Arizona (Peoria)	
2013-01-07	Cedrick Chatman (17)	Black	Illinois (Chicago)	
2013-01-07	Jimenez, Vincent (35)	Hispanic	Arizona (Phoenix)	Officers attempted to stop a driver who seemed impaired. The driver fled and led officers on a chase that ended at the suspect's home where he crashed into a retaining wall. When officers approached the driver, the suspect rammed two cruisers and accelerated towards officers who opened fire. The suspect was pronounced dead at the scene. A five-year-old child was discovered unharmed in the passenger seat.
2013-01-07	Autenrieth, Daniel (31)	White	Pennsylvania (Coolbaugh Township)	Officers responded to a report that the suspect had abducted his 9-year-old son and was armed. A 40-mile chase ended following unspecified police intervention. Officers and the suspect exchanged gunfire which killed one officer and the suspect.
2013-01-07	Flores, Juan (Johnny) Reyna (35)		California (Fresno)	Fresno Police Department officer spotted a parolee Monday afternoon and attempted to talk to him. The man fled and the officer pursued him over several fences. When the man confronted the officer with a knife, the officer fired at him. Neighbors reported hearing two shots. Flores died at a local hospital.
2013-01-07	Jimmy L. Hamlin Jr. (44)	White	West Virginia (Lewisburg)	
2013-01-06	Jeremy Rucinski (38)	White	Michigan (Independence Charter Township)	
2013-01-06	Daniel Brawley (29)	White	Montana (Billings)	
2013-01-06	Mims, Spencer Rollins III (55)	White	North Carolina (Charlotte)	Officers responded to a report from Mims stating that he was having trouble with his son. When officers arrived at his home, they found Mims holding a box-cutter to his own throat. An officer fired a stun gun intending to prevent Mims from harming himself. Mims instead lunged at the officers with the box cutter. An officer shot Mims at least once. Mims died at a local hospital.
2013-01-05	Archuleta, Sonny (33)	White	Colorado (Aurora)	Officers responded to a report of multiple homicides. A woman had escaped from a home and called police after discovering that three people in the home appeared to be dead. A six-hour standoff ensued with the home surrounded by SWAT officers. A man in the home was killed when he shot at police.
2013-01-05	Theodore Keiper (58)	White	California (Ventura)	
2013-01-05	Bernard Rowley (55)	White	Michigan (Belding)	
2013-01-05	Joel Byne (52)	White	Arizona (Surprise)	
2013-01-05	Chuckie Stowers (39)	White	Arizona (Phoenix)	
2013-01-05	Compton, David	Asian	New Jersey (Deptford Township)	Off-duty officer James A. Stuart fatally shot his friend Compton while drunk. Stuart was found guilty of reckless manslaughter.
2013-01-04	Powell, Joseph (21)	White	Florida (Fort Myers)	
2013-01-04	Banks, Darrell (47)	Black	Pennsylvania (Philadelphia)	Plain clothes officers in an alley were investigating an armed home invasion when they spotted a man who matched the suspect's description. The man fled. Police report they fatally shot him when he pointed an object at them. No weapons were recovered at the scene. Family members report Banks was walking home from a birthday party.
2013-01-04	O'Donnell, Seth (26)	White	Pennsylvania (Mt. Pleasant)	Police responded to a report of a disturbance at a store. The suspect had a pair of scissors and was acting violently. O'Donnell slashed an officer's head with the scissors and was then fatally shot.
2013-01-04	Johnson, Xavier (31)	Black	Florida (Miami)	
2013-01-04	Thomas, Yolanda (34)	Black	Florida (Miami)	
2013-01-04	Barry Cloninger (51)	White	Illinois (Edwardsville)	
2013-01-03	Peter Jourdan (37)	Black	New York (Brooklyn)	
2013-01-03	Hunter Jacob Todd (20)	White	California (Citrus Heights)	
2013-01-02	Kenneth Morrow (52)	White	Florida (Ormond Beach)	
2013-01-01	Abel Gurrola (26)		California (Bakersfield)	About 12:05 AM, January 1, Bakersfield Police Department officers responded to reports of gunfire at an apartment complex. They saw Abel Gurrola with a .22 rifle. Gurrola refused to drop the weapon as ordered and he fled. Officers shot Gurrola and he died later that day in a local hospital. The shooting was later ruled justified by the Department Review Board.
2013-01-01	Andrew Closson (21)		Wisconsin (Gordon)	
2013-01-01	Andrew Layton		Minnesota (Mankato)	
2013‑01‑01	Mark Chavez (49)		New Mexico (Farmington)	An officer responded to a report by Chavez that he had killed a woman. Chavez aggressively approached the officer with a blunt impact weapon. The officer used a Taser, which was ineffective. The officer then shot Chavez in the leg and torso. Chavez died at a local hospital. Investigators could not find evidence of a woman having been killed and suspect that Chavez made the call to lure police to his residence.
2013-01-01	Victor Fuentes (22)		Texas (Tyler)	Officers responded to reports of numerous gunshots at a home on New Year's Eve. Officers arrived and heard more gunshots. A man was seen with a weapon and commanded to drop it. He instead went inside the house. After again refusing commands to drop the weapon, Fuentes pointed the handgun at an officer who fatally shot him.
2013-01-01	Christopher Tavares (21)	Hispanic	Colorado (Pueblo)	Officers were investigating a neighborhood after hearing gunfire. They pursued a suspicious vehicle that crashed after a short chase. A passenger in the vehicle shot an officer in the shoulder and three people fled in different directions. Officers found the shooting suspect less than an hour later. They fatally shot Tavares when he refused to listen to the officers' commands and attempted to flee. The two other persons in the vehicle were arrested.
2013-01-01	Tyree Bell (31)		Nebraska (Omaha)	

== See also ==
- Death in custody § United States
- Henry A. Wallace Police Crime Public Database
- List of cases of police brutality
- List of countries with annual rates and counts for killings by law enforcement officers
- List of law enforcement officers killed in the line of duty in the United States
- List of law enforcement officers convicted for an on-duty killing in the United States
- List of shootings by US immigration agents
- List of police reforms related to the George Floyd protests
- List of unarmed African Americans killed by law enforcement officers in the United States
- Lists of killings by law enforcement officers
- Police brutality in the United States
- Police misconduct § United States
- Police riot § United States
- Police use of deadly force in the United States
