= Yamaha Rhino =

Off-road vehicle

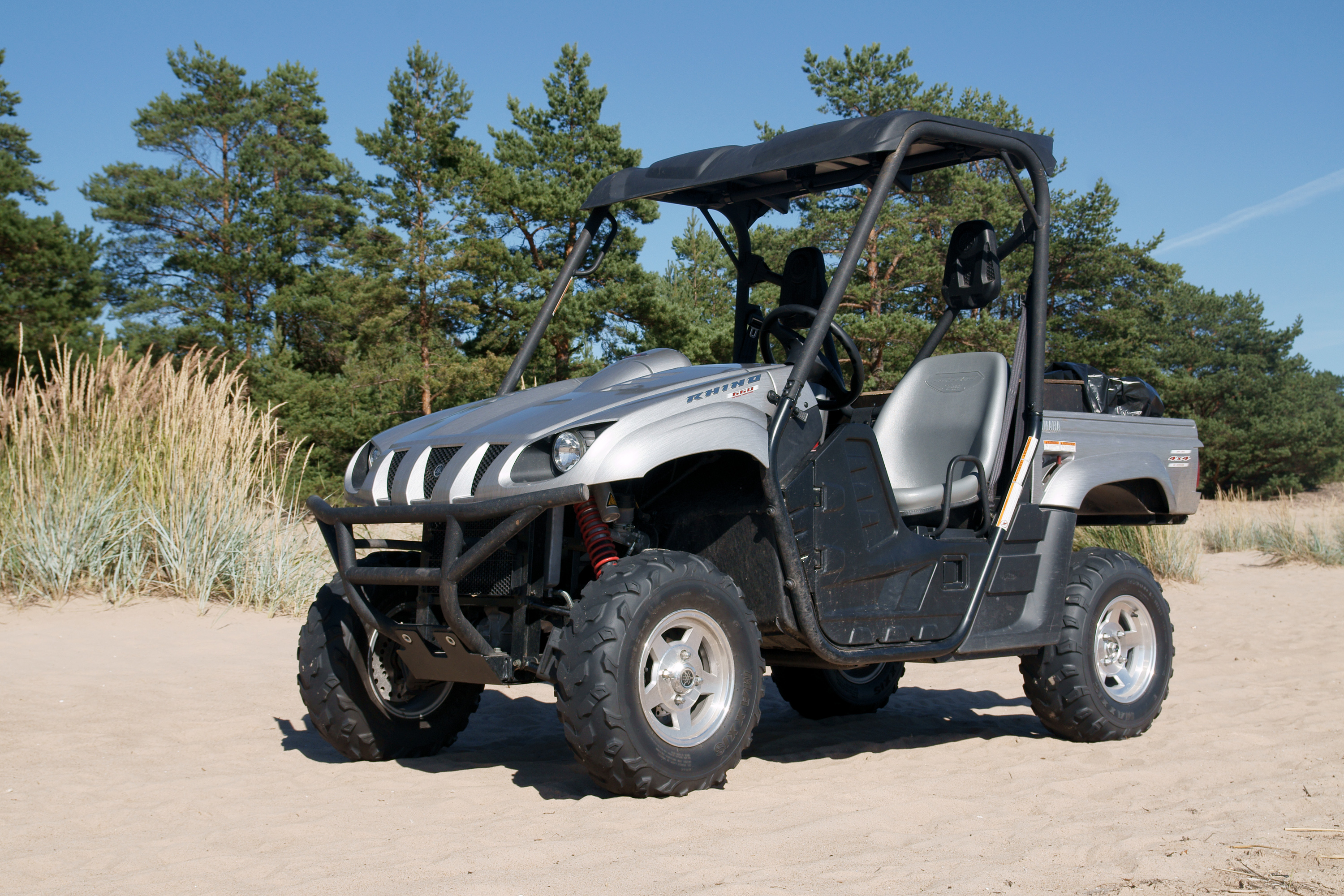
- Yamaha Rhino 660cc

Overview
- Type: Side-by-side
- Manufacturer: Yamaha Motor Company
- Production: 2003–2012
- Model years: 2004–2013
- Assembly: Newnan, Georgia, United States

Dimensions
- Wheelbase: 75 in (1,910 mm)
- Length: 114.4 in (2,907 mm)
- Width: 54.5 in (1,384 mm)
- Height: 73.0 in (1,854 mm)
- Curb weight: 1,199 lb (544 kg)

Chronology
- Successor: Yamaha Viking EPS

The Yamaha Rhino was an American off-road vehicle produced by Yamaha Motor Company from 2004 to 2012. Built at Yamaha's factory in Newnan, Georgia, they could be equipped with either two or four-wheel drive. As a two-seater side-by-side, the vehicle was classified as a utility task vehicle (UTV) or recreational off-highway vehicle (ROV).

== 2009 Free Repair Program ==
On March 31, 2009, the U.S. Consumer Product Safety Commission (CPSC) announced a repair program for Rhino 660 and 450 models. Yamaha also extended the program to Rhino 700 models to ensure customer satisfaction. According to the CPSC, the following two repairs were needed “to help reduce the chance of rollover and improve vehicle handling better”:

- Installation of a two-inch spacer on each of the rear wheels
- Removal of the rear anti-sway bar

Yamaha also announced that same day that the company was temporarily suspending sales of the Rhino until the affected models could be repaired, and the CPSC advised owners not to operate the vehicles until taking them to a dealership for the modifications. All subsequent Rhino 450, 660 and 700 models have the same modifications. The sales suspension lasted less than two months.

== Competitors ==
The main competitors of the Rhino include the

- Polaris Ranger,
- Polaris RZR,
- Arctic Cat Prowler,
- Honda Pioneer,
- Kawasaki Teryx 750 4x4,
- the Can-Am Commande,
- John Deere Gator.
