= Bakersfield Police Department =

Police department in Bakersfield, California

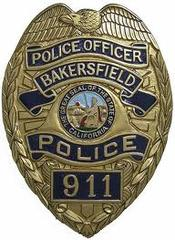
- Abbreviation: BPD

Agency overview
- Formed: 1898
- Employees: 590
- Volunteers: 75

Jurisdictional structure
- Operations jurisdiction: Bakersfield, California, U.S.
- Map of Bakersfield Police Department's jurisdiction
- Area: 151.2 square miles (392 km^{2})
- Population: 383,601 (2018)
- General nature: Local civilian police

Operational structure
- Headquarters: 1601 Truxtun Ave., Bakersfield, California 93301
- Police Officers: 432
- Civilians: 158
- Agency executive: Greg Terry, Chief of Police

Facilities
- Stations: 2
- Vehicles: 400
- K-9s: 11

Website
- https://www.bakersfieldcity.us/257/Police

The Bakersfield Police Department (BPD) is the agency responsible for law enforcement within the city of Bakersfield, California, United States. It has over 590 officers and professional staff, covering an area of 151.2 square miles (392 km^{2}) serving an urban population of more than 400,000. The current chief of the department, since April 2020, is Greg Terry. The department protects the city, split between two areas and six zones with two stations, the main department headquarters and the west side substation. The department administration is made up of the chief of department, two assistant chiefs, four captains and eleven lieutenants.

The department headquarters is located at 1601 Truxtun Ave. The westside substation is located at 1301 Buena Vista Rd. The department shooting range is located on 3419 Truxtun Ave. with the K-9 training field next door to the range. The department training academy is located at 4646 California Avenue.

== Mission statement ==
"The Bakersfield Police Department partners with our community to protect the lives and property of the people we serve."

== Guiding Values ==
"Compassion • Accountability • Professionalism"

== History ==
Founding
The Bakersfield Police Department traces its origin back to the incorporation of the City of Bakersfield in 1898. On January 13, 1898, the Bakersfield City council instituted the Bakersfield City Marshal's Office with Thomas A. Baker as its first Marshal. The police department was itself incorporated on February 27, 1915, with Jacob Horace Dupes as Chief of police.

1920-1960s
Robert B. Powers was hired as a motorcycle patrolman in 1928. He became chief of police in 1933, and instituted a number of reforms and on-the-job training. His first major action was during the California Agricultural Strike of 1933. From May to October 1938 a murder case consumed his time - that of Mathias H. Warren, father of Earl Warren who was soon to be attorney general and then governor of California, and in time, Chief Justice of the United States. In June 1939 Powers supported an initiative to get women on the police force if they were college educated and paid well. On July 3, 1941, the Bakersfield Police Department accepted its first female officer with the hiring of Mary Holman Dodge. In 1944-5 Powers was appointed to a wartime state committee on law enforcement under then-governor Earl Warren. Powers was also a strong voice in determining successive chiefs through to 1966.

In 1968, the department accepted its first African-American into its ranks by the hiring of Irma Carson.

1970s-1990s
In August 1973, the department established the Bomb Squad unit with one operator in order to deal with the emerging threat of explosive ordnance in the city. Today, the squad consists of five bomb detective technicians and two robots.

In June 1988, the department started its K-9 unit, consisting of five officers and 5 working dogs. On February 8, 1994, the Bakersfield Police Activities League was established for at risk youth in the city. In June 1999, the department made city history with the promotion of Eric L. Mattlock as the first African-American chief of police for Bakersfield.

2000-2009
In July 2003, the BPD investigated one of Bakersfield's most heinous and high-profile crimes; The Harper family murders. The killing of two adults and three children in their own home sparked international media coverage and an investigation that would cross the entire United States.

The BPD was able to solve the case and make an arrest of one of the victims husband, Vincent Brothers. On May 15, 2007, Brothers was convicted of the crime of murder in the first degree. The conviction was due to the efforts of the investigations bureau of the Bakersfield Police Department.

On July 8, 2003, the Bakersfield Police Department started a School Resource Officer program by assigning a small detail to local city elementary schools.

2010-2019
In April 2010, the BPD promoted its first female in the departments history to the rank of Captain with the promotion of Hajir Nuridin.

In 2013, BPD began the deactivation of their motorcycle traffic enforcement unit and by 2018 BPD had no motorcycle officers. The reason was the amount of injuries that were being incurred by motorcycle traffic enforcement officers who were involved in numerous traffic collisions. At the time, BPD became the largest law enforcement agency in the United States without an active Motorcycle Traffic Enforcement Unit.

In 2019, BPD announced their intention to bring back motorcycle officers in a pilot program starting with the purchase of 4 Harley-Davidson motorcycles at $107,542. The announcement noted that technology and safety gear had improved and that motorcycle officers are needed to step up traffic enforcement in response to an increase in rush hour crashes.

In August 2019, BPD restarted their solo police academy with the acquisition and refurbishment of a building on California Avenue and Easton Drive. Also in August 2019, BPD created a cold case sexual assault unit for investigating past crimes of sexual assault. This was formed after the department completed a mandatory audit of untested rape kits for the California Department of Justice, in which the BPD had to submit all untested kits. This was also formed due to California's elimination of the statute of limitations on sexual assault in 2017.

== Criticism and Controversies ==
The Bakersfield Police Department has been criticized over the years for heavy-handed tactics and overuse of force. In recent years, complaints regarding excessive use of force, racial profiling, harassment, and response delays have been registered by criminals, suspects, witnesses, and affected family members.

In March 2001, Tony Eddington and Robert Johnson were stopped in the city of Bakersfield for a traffic violation and ordered to strip for a roadside search. The men, both African-American, contend the search was racially motivated, and sued the BPD for damages exceeding $350,000.00. The BPD settled out of court for an undisclosed sum and have since installed a permanent policy detailing rules on when officers may conduct strip searches in the field.

There have been many complaints against the BPD for excessive use of force. Most notably is when there is an officer involved shooting. Many critics of the department have made the charge of shooting first, asking questions later and firing too many rounds at suspects. A federal probe of the BPD was begun in July 2003. The probe would seek information and investigate some 47 complaints against the BPD for use of force and racial profiling. In January 2008, the United States Department of Justice cleared the Bakersfield Police Department of any wrongdoing stemming from the complaints.

On July 5, 2008, it was announced that the BPD will begin using polygraphs as a part of the hiring process to become an officer with the department. The BPD had resisted the concept for several years as other California agencies were introducing polygraphs into their background investigations of law enforcement new hires. The new policy will take effect in early 2009. As a result of polygraph examinations of candidates, several candidates that would have otherwise slipped through the cracks were found to be unsuitable and were separated from the hiring process.

In June 2009, the BPD began on-line crime reporting for citizens. This is the mandatory way for residents of Bakersfield to report non-emergency crime. The department, in the past, had on-line crime reporting, but this was optional. The department now requires all non-emergency crimes to be reported on the department website instead of having a Police Service Technician or Police Officer respond to a report call for service. This procedure allowed Officers to focus on preventing crimes by proactively patrolling their beats instead of writing insurance reports.

In December 2015, the BPD was featured as one of the subjects of an article in United Kingdom's The Guardian newspaper, entitled "The County: The story of America's deadliest police". The article was an investigative report detailing how Kern County Law Enforcement agencies, including BPD, had high number of killings. In the article, it was reported that six people were killed by shots fired by BPD. The article reported a demographic disparity within the department, with 74% of BPD's sworn officers being White, 21% being Hispanic and 5% being African American. The article reported on Officers and their multiple shootings, Officers and their unethical behaviors, criminality within the agency, and officers committing crimes outside of work.

In December 2016, a BPD officer shot and killed a 73-year-old man Francisco Serna when he did not take his hand out of his pocket when ordered to do so. This was stemmed from a report by a neighbor saying he was pointing a gun at her. Later it was determined that the man did not possess a gun as the neighbor had reported. Serna was in the early stages of dementia and thus caused controversy along with the family demanding a federal investigation of the shooting.

== Assignments ==
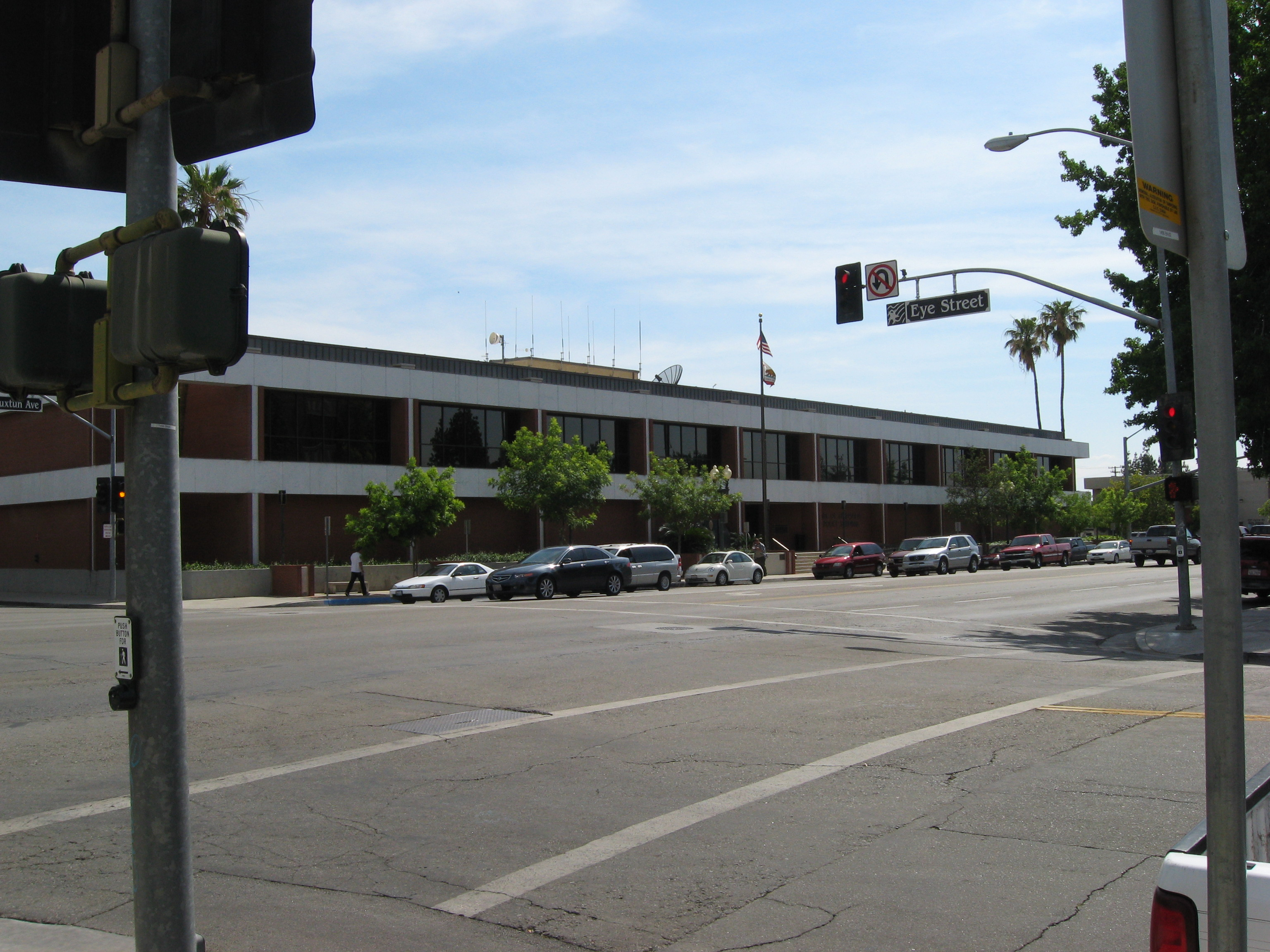
Bakersfield, CA Police Building

=== Sworn assignments ===
- Administration
- Auto Theft Unit
- Bomb Squad
- Civil Disturbance Team
- Computer Forensics Unit
- GHOST Unit (anti-graffiti)
- Homeland Security Unit
- IMPACT Unit (Homeless\Vagrant team)
- Internal Affairs
- Investigations
- K-9 Unit
- Narcotics
- Patrol
- Planning, Research & Training
- Public Information Officer
- Reserve Unit
- School Resource Officer
- Special Enforcement Unit (anti-gang)
- SWAT
- Traffic
- Vice
- Violent Crime Apprehension Team
- Warrant/Fugitive Unit (fugitive recovery)

=== Non-sworn assignments ===
- Animal Control
- Communication Center
- Community Relations Unit
- Crime Analysis Unit
- Crime Lab
- Digital Forensics Unit
- Parking Enforcement
- Police Service Technician
- Property Room
- Records and Reports

=== Volunteers ===
- Citizen Volunteer
- Explorer Post
- Police Chaplain
- Student Intern

== Vehicles and equipment ==
The Bakersfield Police Department employs the latest in uniforms, equipment and vehicles.

=== Uniforms and equipment ===
The badge of the department is a gold-colored metal shield surmounted by an eagle, with blue enamel panels stating the name of department, rank of the holder, and badge number. In the center is an enameled seal of the State of California. This design, common in the Central Valley, is based on the 1923 Series 5 badge of the Los Angeles Police Department.

The current BPD basic patrol uniform consists of 5.11 brand B Class uniform in midnight navy blue. Current department policy mandates all patrol officers, senior officers, uniformed detectives, and sergeants have sewn on cloth department badge patches and embroidered names. Lieutenants, Captains and all chiefs are still allowed metal badges and name plates. Patrol officers working foot-beat patrol or bicycle patrol are authorized to wear navy blue polo shirts with the department badge embroidered and 5.11 Tactical shorts in midnight navy during hot weather conditions. K-9 officers also wear the 5.11 brand B Class uniform with K-9 designation embroidered on the uniform above the embroidered name of the officer. This brings all department patrol officers in line with the same uniforms. All officers in uniform or working field assignments wear Second Chance Level III-A body armor.

The BPD has established an alternate duty uniform for officers for training and other non-enforcement positions. This consists of a navy blue 5.11 Tactical polo shirt with embroidered department badge and name in gold, khaki 5.11 Tactical tactical pants and tan desert service boots. Cloth department badges and embroidered names are required on the polo shirts.

Standard uniform equipment consists of Bianchi AccuMold Elite duty gear with a Safariland Model 6355 Belt Drop, Level III Retention holster, First Defense MK-4 Large Duty Size pepper spray, X-26P TASER electronic less lethal weapon, Diamondwood straight stick baton, and two sets of Peerless chain link handcuffs. Motorola hand-held radios are standard carry.

The BPD Special Enforcement Unit uses most of the same uniforms and equipment as stated above, but are also allowed civilian clothing for undercover operations. Raid vests are used for executing warrant searches and field assignments.

The BPD Civil Disturbance Team wears black 5.11 Tactical two-piece tactical duty uniforms, Galls Upper Body Protection System foam chest protectors, Bell RS100 tactical helmets, MSA Advantage 1000 CBA/RCA gas masks, and Galls shin guards. Flex-cuffs are standard carry for riot situations.

The BPD Bomb Squad wears Crye Precision MultiCam camouflage tactical response uniforms with coyote brown tactical department patches for operations involving the unit. The Bomb Squad uses the First Defense EOD Bomb Disposal Suit for its EOD operations as well as two Andros F6B bomb disposal robots.

The BPD SWAT team wears Crye Precision MultiCam camouflage tactical response uniforms with coyote brown tactical department patches, Crye Precision jumpable modular plate carriers with Level IV hard armor plates in MultiCam camouflage, Avon FM53 protective masks, and Safariland 6004 tactical holsters. Coyote tan Ops-Core brand FAST ballistic helmets are worn during operations along with 3M Peltor COMTAC III tactical communication headsets.

=== Weapons ===
All police officers of the Bakersfield Police Department are issued a department standard duty weapon. The current issue weapon is the officer's choice through initial qualification of either the Glock model G17 Gen 4 9mm full size semi-automatic pistol, or the Glock model G19 Gen 4 9mm compact semi-automatic pistol. The Glock model G26 Gen 4 9mm subcompact handgun is authorized as secondary carry duty weapon for plain clothes detectives, lieutenants, captains and all chiefs. It is department standard for all duty weapons, excluding the Model 43, to have pistol mounted tactical lights of either Surefire or Streamlight manufacture.

Patrol officers of the BPD are given the option of carrying either a Remington Model 870 12-gauge shotgun or a Colt AR-15 5.56 mm Government carbine as a vehicle stationed arm.

The BPD Civil Disturbance Team uses a variety of non-lethal riot control weapons. These include Penn Arms L8-40 fixed stock 40mm multi-launcher Riot gun firing rubber, wood, or riot-control agents, Precision Ordnance Products 'Stingball' grenades, Defense Technology 'Han-Ball' and 'Tripple Chaser' CS grenades, 12 gauge bean-bag, rubber and wood rounds fired from Remington 870 shotguns, X-26 tasers, and Monadnock polycarbonate riot batons, and 48" x 24" x 1/8" concave plastic riot shields.

The BPD SWAT team uses suppressed versions of both the Colt model LE6933 M-4 Commando and model LE6921 M4 Carbine in 5.56 mm suppressed, using either Trijicon RX30-14 Reflex and TA01NSN ACOG sights, Aimpoint CompM4S, or EOTech holographic weapon sights, and SureFire tactical weapon lights, with one weapon issued with an M203 40 mm grenade launcher for less-lethal ordnance, Benelli M4 Tactical Entry 12-gauge semi-auto shotgun with ghost ring sights and SureFire handle mounted tactical lights, a Remington model 870 12-gauge pump shotgun for entry\less-lethal ordnance and a Penn Arms L8-40 fixed stock 40mm multi-launcher Riot gun firing rubber, wood, or riot-control agents. SWAT snipers use customized Remington model 700 Police 7.62 mm bolt-action rifles with Leupold scopes. Entry teams use Defense Technology No.25 distraction devices as well as 'Han-Ball', 'Tripple Chaser' and 40mm launched CS grenades.

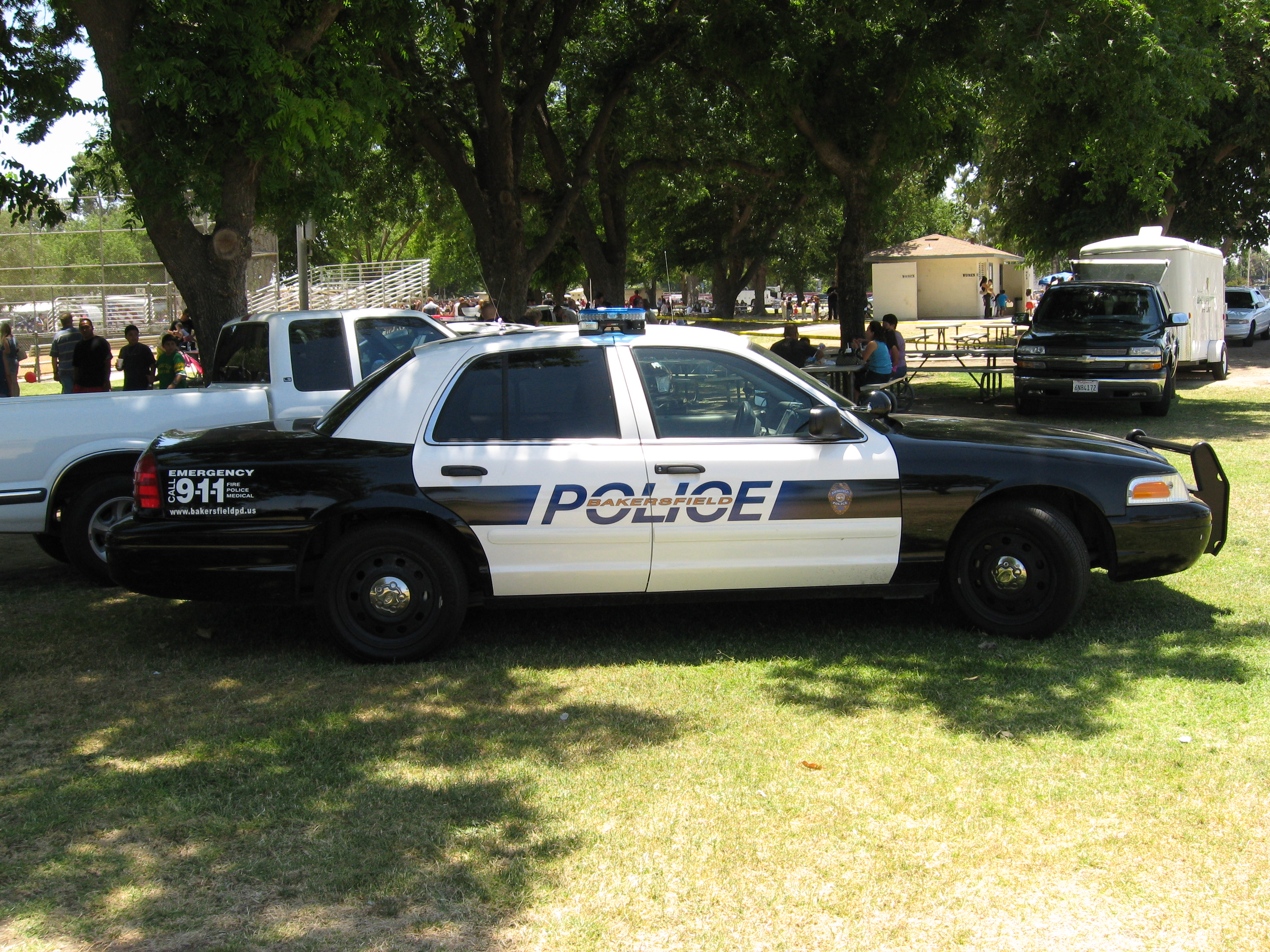
Bakersfield, CA Police cruiser

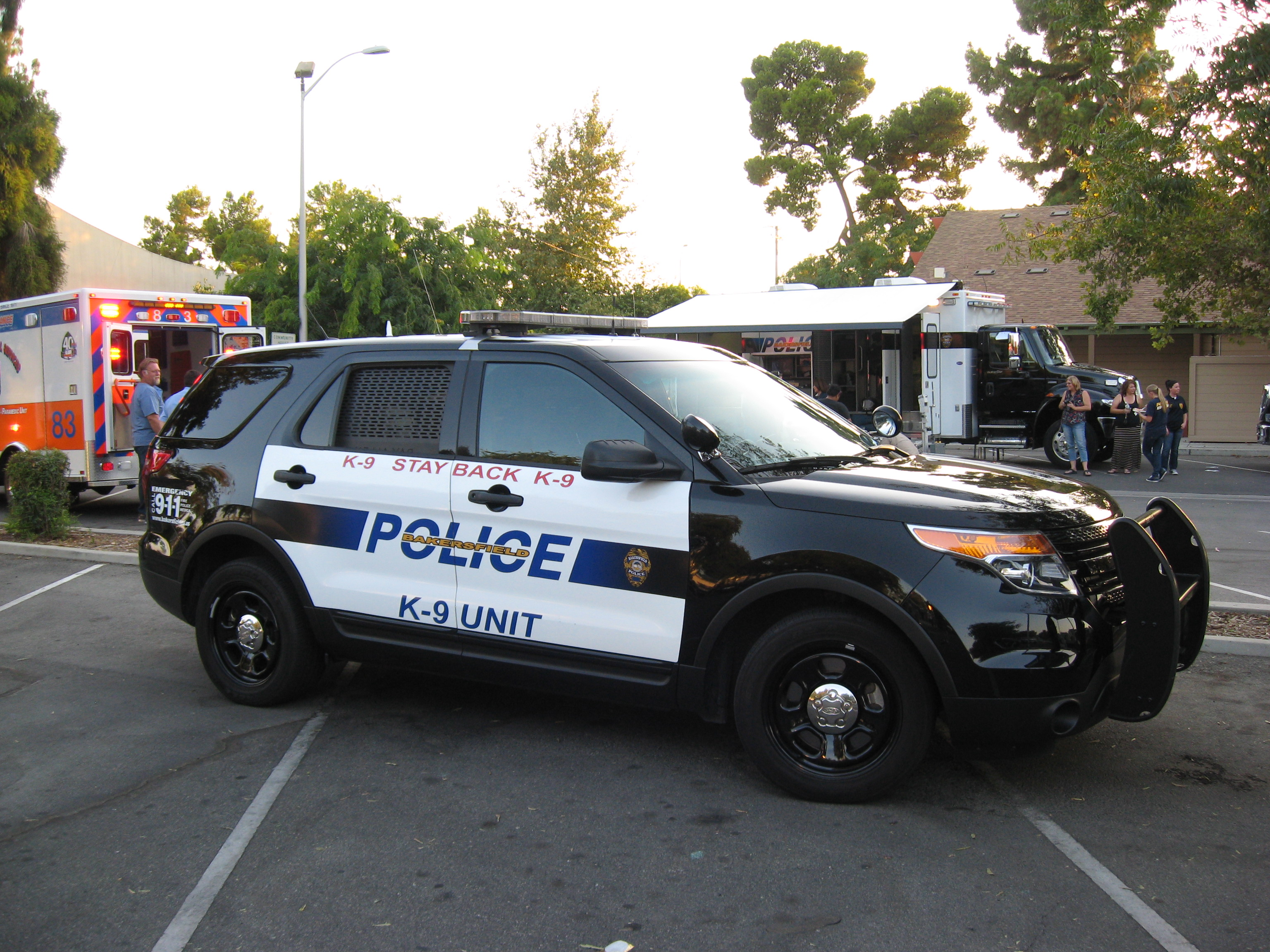
Bakersfield, CA Police K-9 cruiser

=== Vehicles ===
The Bakersfield Police Department operates Ford Taurus Police Interceptors as well as the Ford Police Interceptor Utility as standard patrol vehicles. The cruisers are in the standard black and white configuration with Code 3 Defender LED Lightbars. Their standard siren system is the Code 3 Z3. All BPD cruisers are equipped with Microsoft Windows based mobile data terminals and Motorola console communication radios. Currently, the department is now adding new equipment that will better aide officers during operations and field investigations. The new equipment is to include vehicle licence plate scanners that can search statewide databases on the spot for DUI offenses and stolen vehicles. Cruisers also carry handheld fingerprint scanners known as Blue Check for instantaneous field identification. Also, the BPD is in the use of in-car lineups software package for the mobile data terminals. The program known as COPLINK is connected to major law enforcement databases around the state of California to compile data on possible suspect information. E-cite citation devices are also carried aboard BPD cruisers.

The BPD K-9 unit uses both the Ford Explorer Police Utility and the Chevrolet Tahoe as patrol vehicles.

The BPD Traffic unit operates four Harley Davidson Electra Glide-Police and one BMW R1200RT-P motorcycles in standard black and white configuration with Motorola communication radios, Blue Check handheld fingerprint scanners, and E-cite citation devices. Traffic enforcement also uses standard patrol cruisers with hand held Light Detection and Ranging (LIDAR) units.

The BPD Investigations Bureau and BPD Special Operations Unit uses Ford Crown Victoria Police Interceptors and Ford Taurus Police Interceptor models in civilian color schemes equipped with Microsoft Windows based mobile data terminals with the Coplink system, Blue Check handheld fingerprint scanners, Motorola communication radios and dash mounted emergency lights, as well as numerous civilian vehicles for clandestine operations.

The BPD Police Service Technicians operate Ford F-150 and Dodge Dakota pickups in all white configuration with department logos. All pickups come equipped with Motorola console communication radios as well as various traffic control tools and devices.

The BPD Parking Enforcement Unit operates Ford Focus sedans in all white configurations with department logos and the Westward Go4 Parking Enforcement Vehicle. All sedans come equipped with Motorola console communication radios as well as various parking enforcement tools and devices.

The BPD also operates various specialized vehicles for different operations. These include a Ford F-150 for Commercial Vehicle Enforcement operations, two Yamaha Rhino 4x4 utility vehicles for off-road and river patrol use, two Ford F-150 4x4 pickups for off-road and river patrol use, Ford Econoline and Chevrolet vans for crime scene, crime prevention, prisoner transport use, one Ford Econoline E-450 RV for use by the D.U.I. Task Force and D.U.I. saturation operations, one North Star International DuraStar Custom truck for use by the Bomb Squad, one Freightliner LDV mobile command post for use in emergency operations, one specialized North Star Ford F-650 modular truck for use by the SWAT team, and one Lenco BearCat armored rescue vehicle for use in emergency recovery and SWAT operations. All vehicles are adorned with the Bakersfield Police name and logo.

== Academy and training ==
The Bakersfield Police Department has had a variety of training academies throughout its existence. While most of the academies were run by the BPD with the goal of training solely BPD officers, there has been two occasions when the department, for fiscal reasons, joined with another agency to fund and run a joint academy to train multiple agency officers. The most recent incarnation that the BPD operated was the Bakersfield Law Enforcement Training Academy located on the grounds of Bakersfield College, which began operations in January 1999 and culminated with the graduating of Class 01/99 on June 5, 1999. The academy continued to train officers for Bakersfield Police and other agencies until 2008 when a fiscal crisis demanded that the department once again be joined with the Kern County Sheriff Department to train law enforcement officers. Both the BPD and the KCSO commanded the Kern Regional Law Enforcement Training Academy, located on Norris Road. The KRLETA is accredited by and follows the criteria set forth by the California commission of Peace Officers Standards and Training. As of August 2019, Bakersfield Police Department restarted a solo police academy in their own facility at 4646 California Avenue. The building is a heavily refurbished former restaurant. The facility was refurbished and upgraded with classrooms and locker room facilities, and a defensive tactics room.

== Multimedia ==
The Bakersfield Police Department has established an informational website that allows the citizens of Bakersfield the opportunity to be involved in solving criminal cases within the Bakersfield community. The "Bakersfield Police Open-Case Files" is a continuously updated website that permits citizens to review open and unsolved cases and report any and all information that they may have that may assist the department in solving cold cases and leading to the arrest and conviction of outstanding criminals.

The Bakersfield Police Department provides an informational website that tracks the crime rates in the city. "Bakersfield Police Crime Statistics" is an interactive website that provides the statistics for crime reporting and calls for service in a given area. Users of the site can locate their area within the city of Bakersfield and see the level of crime for a particular date. The site lists areas by maps, calls for service levels and the location of crimes that have occurred.

The Bakersfield Police Department has authorized the establishment of a multimedia informational website other than their official city website. The "BPDInsider" is a monthly updated website that provides topics of interest and question that can be answered about the Bakersfield Police Department. The sight was fully operational as of March 12, 2008.

The Bakersfield Police Activities League maintains a website dedicated to their efforts to prevent juvenile delinquency by providing skills through education, athletics and opportunities to at risk youth.

The Bakersfield Police Officers Association maintains a website dedicated to the department's police officer union as well as giving information to the general public about officer activities and events.

== Portrayals in fiction ==
A television sitcom entitled Bakersfield P.D. aired on the FOX network during the 1993–1994 season. It dealt with life inside the Bakersfield Police Department, portraying the department as an incompetent, backwoods police force. It starred Chris Mulkey, Tony Plana, Ron Eldard and Brian Doyle-Murray.

The Clint Eastwood 1980 film Any Which Way You Can featured scenes in the city of Bakersfield with a car chase scene involving Bakersfield Police officers.

A fourth season episode of CSI: Crime Scene Investigation, entitled "Dead Ringer", featured a secondary murder plot involving a female Bakersfield Police detective as a possible suspect.

In 1999, KB Toys released a line of exclusive diecast metal toy cars based on classic hotrod cars featuring real city police logos and paint schemes. "Cop Rods" by Mattel featured a tail dragger hotrod decorated in the Bakersfield Police department style.

In 2010, Dwayne "The Rock" Johnson starred in the film Faster in which he is released from prison and immediately begins hunting down and killing the people who killed his brother. The movie is said to take place in Bakersfield, Arvin, and an unnamed area state prison; however, it was filmed in Los Angeles, Palmdale, and the Mono Lake areas. There are scenes showing police vehicles with accurate Bakersfield Police cars and the badges worn by officers appear to be similar to real BPD badges.

The Zoe Saldaña 2011 film Colombiana features the Bakersfield Police Department as the police agency that arrests the protagonist in the beginning section of the film.

== See also ==
- List of law enforcement agencies in California
- Bakersfield
