= Bagley-Keene Act =

State legislation in California, US

The Bagley-Keene Act of 1967, officially known as the Bagley-Keene Open Meeting Act, implements a provision of the California Constitution which declares that "the meetings of public bodies and the writings of public officials and agencies shall be open to public scrutiny", and explicitly mandates open meetings for California State agencies, boards, and commissions. The act facilitates accountability and transparency of government activities and protects the rights of citizens to participate in State government deliberations. Similarly, California's Brown Act of 1953 protects citizen rights with regard to open meetings at the county and local government level.

The act also reaffirms, "The people of this state do not yield their sovereignty to the agencies which serve them. The people, in delegating authority, do not give their public servants the right to decide what is good for the people to know and what is not good for them to know. The people insist on remaining informed so that they may retain control over the instruments they have created."

== Select provisions of Act ==
Except as otherwise provided, State bodies shall provide an opportunity for members of the public to directly address the State body on each agenda item before or during the state body's discussion or consideration of an item. However, the Act allows a great many exceptions to this provision.

Notice of State body meetings shall be provided to any person who makes such a request in writing at least 10 days in advance. Notices shall include a specific agenda for meetings, including the items of business to be transacted or discussed, and no item shall be added to the agenda subsequent to the notice. Agendas of public meetings and other writings, when distributed to the members of a state body for discussion or consideration at a public meeting of such body, are public records under the California Public Records Act.

State bodies may, however, take action on non-agendized items of business under certain circumstances, most notably upon a determination by a majority vote of the State body that an emergency situation exists.

Any person attending an open and public meeting of a State body shall have the right to record the proceedings on a tape recorder.

Each member of the state body shall be provided a copy of the Act upon his or her appointment to membership or assumption of office.

No State agency shall conduct any meeting or function in any facility prohibiting admittance to any person on the basis of race, religious creed, color, national origin, ancestry, or sex.

== Act's preamble ==
Section 11120: It is the public policy of this state that public agencies exist to aid in the conduct of the people's business and the proceedings of public agencies be conducted openly so that the public may remain informed. In enacting this article the Legislature finds and declares that it is the intent of the law that actions of state agencies be taken openly and that their deliberation be conducted openly. The people of this state do not yield their sovereignty to the agencies which serve them. The people, in delegating authority, do not give their public servants the right to decide what is good for the people to know and what is not good for them to know. The people insist on remaining informed so that they may retain control over the instruments they have created. This article shall be known and may be cited as the Bagley-Keene Open Meeting Act.

== See also ==
- Brown Act
- California Public Records Act
- Freedom of Information Act
- Sunshine law
- Transparency (humanities) (metaphorical term, also related to politics)
- Government of California
- Conflict of interest
- California First Amendment Coalition
- Californians Aware
