= JusticeLA =

Coalition to stop expansion of the L.A. County Jail system

- Founded: 2017
- Founders: Patrisse Cullors, Diana Zuñiga, among others
- Location: Los Angeles, California
- Key people: Ivette Alé, Lex Steppling, Eunisses Hernandez, Mark-Anthony Clayton-Johnson
- Website: justicelanow.org

JusticeLA is a coalition of organizations and individuals committed to stopping the expansion and growth of the Los Angeles County Jail system and replacing that system with an infrastructure of community-based care and treatment. L.A. County has the largest jail system in the world.

The JusticeLA coalition includes dozens of national and local organizations including Color of Change, Critical Resistance Los Angeles, Youth Justice Coalition, American Civil Liberties Union of Southern California, Black Lives Matter: Los Angeles, Center for Popular Democracy, Code Pink, Drug Policy Alliance, Liberty Tree Foundation for the Democratic Revolution, Service Employees International Union, and United Way of Greater Los Angeles, among others. Patrisse Cullors, Diana Zuñiga, and other activists based in Los Angeles co-founded JusticeLA.

== Opposition to L.A. County jail expansion ==
=== L.A. County jail expansion plan ===
In 2015, Los Angeles County Board of Supervisors, the governing body for Los Angeles County, California, began to consider replacing Men's Central Jail with a mental health jail called "Consolidated Correctional Treatment Facility," which would be run by the Los Angeles County Sheriff's Department. L.A. County also considered building a women's jail in Lancaster. The women's jail was planned to be relocated to a U.S. Immigration and Customs Enforcement (ICE) facility, which is located eighty miles outside of Los Angeles. This plan by the county came after the United States Department of Justice reached an agreement with County where its jails would be monitored with court oversight to address the treatment of people with mental illness in its jail system. The federal government was increasingly concerned about the number of suicides occurring in LA County jails.

In 2019, the L.A. County Board of Supervisors cancelled their plan to build a new jail and instead planned to build a mental health treatment facility. The County awarded award a contract of over two billion dollars to build the new mental health facility. JusticeLA opposed and protested the building of a mental health treatment facility in the place of Men's Central Jail.

=== Founding of JusticeLA ===
JusticeLA was formed in the Fall of 2017. For over two years, JusticeLA organized protests, public education campaigns and provided policy recommendations to stop jail expansion in L.A. County. In September 2017, JusticeLA organized their first direct action to protest the proposed jail expansion. Later in 2017, JusticeLA organized #JailBedDrop where jail beds were placed throughout L.A. County to highlight inequities in the criminal justice system. During one direct action, one artist read poetry and tied dolls to the bedposts to represent each family member who had been incarcerated.

JusticeLA also presented a brief to the Board in 2017 entitled "Reclaim, Reimagine and Reinvest: An Analysis of Los Angeles County’s Criminalization Budget." The budget brief was critical of jail and policing expansion in L.A. County.

=== Cancellation of jail expansion ===
In February 2019, the L.A. County Board of Supervisors voted to cancel the contract to relocate the women's jail to Lancaster. JusticeLA held a rally and protest before the vote.

In August 2019, the Board ultimately voted to cancel their plan to build a jail facility, called the "Mental Health Treatment Center" that would have provided mental health services. L.A. County adopted the "Care First, Jail Last" approach which JusticeLA had pushed for. The County created an Alternatives to Incarceration (ATI) work group. More than 230 members of the coalition attended the hearing the Kenneth Hahn Hall of Administration. Former California State Senator Holly Mitchell said of their influence: “I give them full credit with bringing pressure to bear on a board [the county board of supervisors] that I’m not sure would have done it on their own.”

=== MCJ closure ===
In July 2020, the County created a workgroup to create plans for the closure of Men's Central Jail. In March 2021, JusticeLA co-hosted a protest and rally to demand the closure of Men's Central Jail.

== Care First Initiatives ==
In June 2020, JusticeLA presented a "Care First Budget" to the LA County Board of Supervisors. The budget called for a shift toward public health and away from policing and incarceration. The budget would have reallocated funding from the Los Angeles County Sheriff's Department toward alternatives to incarceration, such as supportive housing and mental health services.

JusticeLA also helped in the passage of L.A. County's Measure J. This measure requires the County to allocate millions of dollars of the County budget toward community-based social services. In 2021, JusticeLA rallied and demanded that the County fully-fund Measure J.

JusticeLA has advocated for the County to expand its efforts to divert people with mental illness, which would aid a reduction of the jail population and the closure of MCJ.

== Pretrial detention ==
=== Prop. 25 ===
In 2020, the JusticeLA coalition opposed 2020 California Proposition 25, which would have eliminated the state's cash bail system. The coalition took the position that the new law would have expanded the power of judges to incarcerate people pretrial and would have expanded the use of racially-biased pretrial risk assessment tools. California voters rejected Proposition 25.

=== Care First California Coalition ===
JusticeLA advocates for a pretrial system that centers the Presumption of innocence, ends money bail, rejects risk assessments and dramatically reduces the number of people eligible for pretrial incarceration. JusticeLA is a part of the Care First California Coalition which seeks to reduce policing and carceral systems statewide in California. In 2021, the Care First California Coalition called on Gavin Newsom and the California legislature to reject funding for pretrial supervision programs that were designed to be run by law enforcement. The coalition advocates for community-based pretrial services that are independent of probation officers and law enforcement.

== Artist collaboration ==
JusticeLA has collaborated with artists to send a messages about the effects of mass incarceration.

=== Suing to Save Lives ===
In 2020, several celebrities collaborated with JusticeLA to create a public service announcement #SuingToSaveLives about the health of people in L.A. County jails amid the COVID-19 pandemic. The PSA came after JusticeLA filed an emergency class-action lawsuit against the L.A. County government for failing to protect people in L.A. County jails during the pandemic. The PSA featured Natalie Portman, Gabrielle Union, Joaquin Phoenix, Mahershala Ali, Sterling K. Brown, Kendrick Sampson, Matt McGorry, Busy Philipps, Brandon Flynn, Sophia Bush, Lauren Jauregui, Megalyn Echikunwoke, Shailene Woodley, and Dawn-Lyen Gardner. They each read a declaration from one of the currently incarcerated plaintiffs for the PSA.

=== Rose that Grew from Concrete Vigil ===
After the Murder of George Floyd, JusticeLA organized a vigil outside of Hall of Justice (Los Angeles) to remember the lives lost at the hands of law enforcement. The Vigil also honored who have died in jail and the thousands of people in L.A. jails. People laid flowers outside the Hall of Justice during the vigil. The idea was inspired by Tupac Shakur's poem entitled The Rose That Grew from Concrete (poetry collection).

=== Defund The Sheriff Album ===
JusticeLA, in collaboration with Schools Not Prisons, Question Culture, and Reform L.A. Jails, released the album "Defund the Sheriff," which was part of a campaign to shift funding away from incarceration and policing in L.A. County. Contributors to the album included Aloe Blacc, Madame Gandhi, Rain Phoenix, Vic Mensa, Aja Monet, Lauren Jauregui among others.
