= Peace Officers: Release of Records =

Police records release law

California Senate Bill 35

California State Legislature
- Long title: An act to amend Sections 65400 and 65582.1 of, and to add and repeal Section 65913.4 of, the Government Code, relating to housing.
- Enacted by: 2017-18 session of the California State Legislature
- Enacted: September 30, 2018
- Signed by: Jerry Brown
- Effective: January 1, 2019
- Introduced by: Nancy Skinner
- Introduced: December 15, 2016

Keywords
- Police Brutality, California
- Status: Current legislation

SB 1421, Senate Bill 1421, or Peace Officers: Release of Records, is a California state law that makes police records relating to officer use-of-force incidents, sexual assault, and acts of dishonesty accessible under the California Public Records Act. The bill was signed into law by then-governor Jerry Brown on September 30, 2018, and took effect on January 1, 2019.

State Senator Nancy Skinner introduced the bill and it was sponsored by advocacy groups including the ACLU of California, Anti Police-Terror Project, Black Lives Matter, California Faculty Association, California News Publishers Association, and Youth Justice Coalition.

== Details of the bill ==
=== Newly available information ===
Records related to:

- Officer shooting at a person
- Officer use of force causing death or great bodily injury against a person
- Officer sexually assaulting a person
- Officer dishonesty about a crime or misconduct of another officer

=== Redactions ===
Only the following may be redacted:

- Personal information (home address, phone number, etc. - as listed in bill) of the officer
- Information to preserve the anonymity of complainants and witnesses

=== Disclosure delays ===
Disclosure may be delayed when:

- The record is subject of an active criminal or administrative investigation
  - A record may be delayed a maximum of 60 days from use of force
  - After 60 days, a record may delayed for up to 18 months if the record expected to interfere with a proceeding
    - Written explanations for the delay must be provided at 180 day intervals
- Criminal charges are filed related to the incident
  - The disclosure of records may be delayed until a verdict on those charges is returned at trial
  - If a plea of guilty or no contest is entered, the time to withdraw the plea pursuant to Section 1018

=== Additional details ===
- Frivolous complaints, as defined in Section 128.5 of the Code of Civil Procedure, shall not be released
- If an officer publicly makes a statement that is false about their own investigation via an established medium (TV, radio, newspaper), the agency may release factual information concerning the investigation

== Loopholes ==
Only sustained findings are required to be released. When an officer resigns the findings are not considered sustained and the records remains hidden. This loophole was used by Paso Robles Police Department to avoid releasing investigation records relating to a rape accusation about former Sgt. Christopher McGuire.

== Response ==
When SB 1421 took effect on January 1, 2019, there was disagreement about if the law applies to records before the law took place. In April, Karl Olson, a San Francisco attorney, said there are as many as 20 lawsuits related to requests seeking access to records. In March, over 170 agencies were fighting the new law. Attempts to block the release of records mostly failed.

=== Delays ===
Six months after the law took effect, many of the state's largest law enforcement agencies had produced little to no records.

- The California Highway Patrol had produced no records.
- L.A. County Sheriff Alex Villanueva’s department would not cooperate unless reporters identified specific cases.
- The Los Angeles County Probation Department will not release records, citing laws prohibiting records about minors from being released.
- The San Francisco Police Department has released no disciplinary records.
- The Fresno Police Department initially denied all requests.
- The San Jose Police Department, under Chief Edgardo Garcia, released only six full files 1.5 years after the law took effect.

In March 2021, the San Francisco Police Department said it would take 10 years to get through its backlog of record requests.

=== Fees ===
Several law enforcement agencies requested significant fees for access to records.

- West Sacramento estimated the cost to redact five shootings worth of material would be $25,000.
- LAist was charged $1,655 for redacted audio related to shootings.

=== Destruction ===
Cities destroyed records before the law took place. Yuba County destroyed records just after the law took effect. County officials claimed the purge was routine despite the fact that many of the records were years past their required retention dates.

== Findings ==
Here are some examples of records released due to SB 1421.

- The Ceres police department's internal investigation found officers justified in ramming Nicholas Pimentel's vehicle during a high speed pursuit and then using another car to pin the vehicle against a truck. Before these documents were released, the city was sued for this case and settled for $2 million.
- The San Francisco Department of Police Accountability released document showing that they found the offices who shot Alex Nieto and Amilcar Perez-Lopez to be acting within policy.
- In May 2020, the city of Fullerton published 2,400 pages of documents about the 2011 death of Kelly Thomas (a case which has been described as "one of the worst police beatings in [US] history"), revealing for example that supervisors had “edited” the reports provided by the involved officers, and that one of them had already been on a performance improvement plan due to a prior incident.
- In Nov 2020, San Francisco Public Defender Manohar Raju released CopWatch SF (link), a tool making data released under SB 1421 more accessible.
- As of June, 2022 over 100 sexual misconduct cases have been released in California.
- In December 2022 San Jose’s Independent Police Auditor created a public records portal to search misconduct records.

== Expansion via California Senate Bill 16 (2021) ==
SB 16, which was approved by Governor Gavin Newsom in September 2021, makes more police disciplinary records available such as records about:

- allegations of discrimination
- unlawful arrests
- covering up incidents of excessive force by another officer

== Expansion via California Senate Bill 776 (2019) ==
In June 2020, during the George Floyd protests, Senator Nancy Skinner introduced Senate Bill 776 to expand upon SB 1421.

SB 776 would:

- Make more records available including:
  - All use of force records available, not just those with "great bodily injury"
  - Complains that aren't sustained, closing a major loophole
  - Complaints related to actions against any protected class
  - Sustained information related to wrongful arrests or searches
- Allow police records more than five years old to be used in trial
- Require agencies to review officer history before hiring them
- Limit fees agencies can charge
- Add civil fines for agencies that don't comply

On September 1, 2020, SB 776 was ordered to the Inactive list and on November 11, 2020, SB 776 died on the Inactive List.
