= Brain Storm (character) =

- Cover art for Justice League of America #32 (December, 1964). Art by Mike Sekowsky and Murphy Anderson. Brainstorm first appearance.

Publication information
- Publisher: DC Comics
- First appearance: Justice League of America #32 (December, 1964)
- Created by: Gardner Fox; Mike Sekowsky

In-story information
- Alter ego: Axel Storm; Alan Barnes; Dominic Lanse
- Abilities: Mental powers through stellar energy helmet

Brain Storm is the name of three fictional characters appearing in the comics published by DC Comics. The first Brain Storm appeared in Justice League of America #32 (December 1964) and was created by writer Gardner Fox and artist Mike Sekowsky.

Brainstorm made his first live-action debut on the fourth season of The Flash, portrayed by Kendrick Sampson.

== Fictional character biography ==
=== Axel Storm ===
Axel Storm created a special helmet that allowed him to absorb stellar energy, which he could use to create virtually anything which his imagination could conceive. This invention having warped his mind, Brain Storm witnesses his brother Fred's apparent death. In his twisted ideals, Brain Storm captured the Justice League so that they could witness him taking justice into his own hands and killing the man responsible for his brother's demise. Part of his plan involves stealing the powers and abilities from the Justice League members and redistributing them to random people. However, a side effect to Brain Storm's power was that whoever the power was used upon could also access the energy abilities, resulting in the JLA members being mentally linked to the people who had gained their abilities.

The Justice League discovers that Fred had been inadvertently transported to France after Green Lantern attempted to stop him from robbing a bank. Bringing Fred to them and restoring his memory, the Justice League convince Brain Storm to end his vendetta against the Green Lantern. However, Brain Storm realizes that escape was the best course of action and teleports away without a trace, leaving the JLA to turn Fred over to the police.

Brain Storm returns to plague the League once again, using his powers to give each team member a severe physical disability. Superman is blinded, Flash's legs are fused together, Green Arrow loses the use of his arms, Green Lantern develops a stutter, and Hawkman develops breathing problems. After being defeated, Brain Storm restores all the JLA members back to normal, then captures and enslaves them. Batman knocks Brain Storm out, relinquishing his control over the JLA members.

Some years later, Brain Storm turned up again, this time without his powers. He kidnaps Terrorsmith in the hopes of using his powers to reactivate his own lost abilities. This plan proves unsuccessful however, and the Terrorsmith is able to escape.

=== Alan Barnes ===
A different version of Brainstorm named Alan Barnes appears in S.T.A.R. Corps. A research volunteer with artificially generated psionic abilities created by S.T.A.R. Labs. He uncovers the true nature of the Mindgame computer and the Gamesman units.

=== Dominic Lanse ===
A new Brainstorm debuted against Michael Holt, but is not related to the original. He is Dominic Lanse, a Silicon Valley scientist who was working on downloading unique intellects into machines. His success was reversed by an accident that let him reverse the process and transfer those intellects into himself. But Mister Terrific is able to supercharge his mind with the T-Spheres rendering him unconscious. It is also revealed that this version is indirectly responsible for the death of Holt's wife.

== In other media ==
=== Television ===
The Dominic Lanse incarnation of Brainstorm appears in the fourth season of The Flash, portrayed by Kendrick Sampson. This version is a telepathic metahuman who was created by the Thinker. With help from Amunet Black, the Thinker implants his consciousness into Lanse's body, killing him in the process.

=== Miscellaneous ===
- The Axel Storm incarnation of Brainstorm appears in Justice League Unlimited #8.
- An unidentified Brainstorm appears in DC Super Friends #24.
