= Grunsky-Burton Open Meeting Act =

The Grunsky-Burton Open Meeting Act was enacted by the California Legislature in 1973. It became Section 9027 of the Government Code. It provided that all meetings of the Senate and Assembly and the committees, subcommittees and conference committees were to be "open to the public" so that the populace may remain informed.

== Repeal ==
The section was repealed in 1984 and replaced with Section 9926 of the Legislative Reform Act of 1983. In 1989, those provisions were repealed and replaced with similar provisions which can be found again at Sections 9027 through 9031, inclusive, of the Government Code.

== See also ==
- Freedom of information law (California)
