= California Proposition 59 =

California Proposition 59 refers to one of the following

- California Proposition 59 (2004), an amendment of the Constitution of California that introduced freedom of information or "sunshine" provisions
- California Proposition 59 (2016), an advisory question on the California general election ballot regarding overturning the Citizens United court decision
