= Copyright status of works by the government of Florida =

Under Florida's Constitution and its statutes, the state and its agents are not permitted to claim copyright on its public records unless the legislature specifically permits it. This includes a work made or received pursuant to law or ordinance or in connection with the transaction of official business by any state, regional, county, district, municipal, or other unit of government and their associated committees and divisions created or established by the laws of the Government of Florida. Text, communications, and images produced by the government of Florida and any county, region, district, authority, agency, or municipal officer, department, division, board, committee, bureau, commission, or other separate unit of government created or established by law are consequently in the public domain according to court interpretation in Microdecisions, Inc. v. Skinner.

The bar on copyright extends to any "public record made or received in connection with the official business of any public body, officer, or employee of the state, or persons acting on their behalf, except with respect to records exempted [specifically by statute or specifically made exempt or] confidential by the Constitution. [It] specifically includes the legislative, executive, and judicial branches of government and each agency or department created thereunder; counties, municipalities, and districts; and each constitutional officer, board, and commission, or entity created pursuant to law or [the Florida] Constitution."

There are various categories of works for which the legislature has specifically permitted copyright to be claimed, mostly for a few applications or development processes wherein the state derives income and while competing with private industries in the commercial realm, such as allowing the Department of the Lottery, the Department of Citrus, and some university research departments to secure copyrights for certain works that are expressly defined and narrowly limited. The list of valid exemptions is culled regularly via a sunset policy to exclude items put on the list by error or via legislation passed within a recent session that does not conform to the laws. The state is attempting to streamline its exemptions and the current status of works claiming exemption must be verified as conforming to the laws before being presumed to be copyright since copyright may be claimed in error for things that remain a public record nonetheless.

== See also ==
- Commons:Copyright tags
- Copyright status of works by the federal government of the United States
- Copyright status of works by subnational governments of the United States
- Microdecisions, Inc. v. Skinner, 889 S.2d 871 (Fla. 2d Dist. App. 2004)
- County of Santa Clara v. California First Amendment Coalition
