= Copyright status of works by subnational governments of the United States =

The copyright status of works produced by the governments of states, territories, and municipalities in the United States varies. Copyright law is federal in the United States. Federal law expressly denies U.S. copyright protection to two types of government works: works of the U.S. federal government itself, and all edicts of any government regardless of level or whether or not foreign. Other than addressing these "edicts of government", U.S. federal law does not address copyrights of U.S. state and local government.

The U.S. Copyright Office gives guidance that "Works (other than edicts of government) prepared by officers or employees of any government (except the U.S. Government) including State, local, or foreign governments, are subject to registration if they are otherwise copyrightable." This leaves such works with the usual copyright protection unless applicable state or local law declares otherwise. Those laws, in turn, vary widely: some state and local governments expressly claim copyright over some or all of their copyrightable works, others waive copyright and declare that all government-produced documents are in the public domain, and yet others have not clearly defined their policies on the question.

== States ==
=== Arizona ===
Works by the Arizona state government "are not in the public domain and are protected by copyright." Permission is generally required to use public records for commercial purposes. The Arizona State Library, Archives and Public Records, a division of the Arizona Secretary of State, tells readers that permission for commercial use must be obtained according to procedures described in ARS § 39-121.03.

=== California ===
In 2009, the California Court of Appeal for the Sixth District, which has statewide jurisdiction, ruled, in County of Santa Clara v. California First Amendment Coalition, that the California Public Records Act did not provide authority for copyrighting government records subject to disclosure under the act. The Court noted that other provisions of California law do expressly provide for the copyright of specific types of materials created by the state. The court noted that:

The Legislature knows how to explicitly authorize public bodies to secure copyrights when it means to do so. For example, the Education Code includes a number of provisions authorizing copyrights, including this one: "Any county board of education may secure copyrights, in the name of the board, to all copyrightable works developed by the board, and royalties or revenue from such copyrights are to be for the benefit of the board securing such copyrights." (Ed. Code, § 1044; see also, e.g., id., §§ 32360, 35170, 72207, 81459.)

=== Colorado ===
Under the Colorado Public Records Act documents and other works created by the state or local governments may be trademarked or copyrighted. Specifically:

[n]othing in this article shall preclude the state or any of its agencies, institutions, or political subdivisions from obtaining and enforcing trademark or copyright protection for any public record, and the state and its agencies, institutions, and political subdivisions are hereby specifically authorized to obtain and enforce such protection in accordance with the applicable federal law; except that this authorization shall not restrict public access to or fair use of copyrighted materials and shall not apply to writings which are merely lists or other compilations. (Colo. Rev. Stat. Ann. § 24-72-203.)

=== Florida ===
Under Florida's Constitution and its statutes, the state and its agents are not permitted to claim copyright on its public records unless the legislature specifically permits it. This includes a work made or received pursuant to law or ordinance or in connection with the transaction of official business by any state, regional, county, district, municipal, or other units of government and their associated committees and divisions created or established by the laws of the Government of Florida. Text, communications, and images produced by the government of Florida and any county, region, district, authority, agency, or municipal officer, department, division, board, committee, bureau, commission, or another separate unit of government created or established by law are consequently in the public domain according to court interpretation in Microdecisions, Inc. v. Skinner (2004).

The bar on copyright extends to any "public record made or received in connection with the official business of any public body, officer, or employee of the state, or persons acting on their behalf, except concerning records exempted [specifically by statute or specifically made exempt or] confidential by the Constitution. [It] specifically includes the legislative, executive, and judicial branches of government and each agency or department created thereunder; counties, municipalities, and districts; and each constitutional officer, board, and commission, or entity created under law or [the Florida] Constitution."

There are various categories of works for which the legislature has specifically permitted copyright to be claimed, mostly for a few applications or development processes wherein the state derives income and while competing with private industries in the commercial realm, such as allowing the department of the lottery, the department of citrus, and some university research departments to secure copyrights for certain works that are expressly defined and narrowly limited. The list of valid exemptions is culled regularly via a sunset policy to exclude items put on the list by error or via legislation passed within a recent session that does not conform to the laws. The state is attempting to streamline its exemptions and the current status of works claiming an exemption must be verified as conforming to the laws before being presumed to be copyright since copyright may be claimed in error for things that remain a public record nonetheless.

=== Georgia ===
Under the Constitution of Georgia and its statutes, the state and its agents are not permitted to claim copyright or prevent disclosure on or of its public records or works unless the legislature specifically permits it. Public works includes all work "created or received in the performance of duty and paid for by public funds". All public works are able to be inspected or copyrighted unless otherwise exempted by law or by a court order.

The following agencies are permitted to claim copyright:

- Georgia Court of Appeals – O.C.G.A § 50-18-34 (2023) (official reports of the decisions of the Court of Appeals, together with the usual title pages, indexes, etc.)
- Supreme Court of Georgia – O.C.G.A § 50-18-34 (2023) (official reports of the decisions of the Supreme Court, together with the usual title pages, indexes, etc.)
- Georgia Department of Revenue – O.C.G.A § 40-2-60.1, 85.3,and 86.1 (2023) (certain license plate designs)
- Georgia Lottery – O.C.G.A § 50-27-9 (2023)
- Georgia Department of Economic Development – § 50-7-8, O.C.G.A (2014)

=== Indiana ===
Indiana's public records law does not allow public agencies (not state agencies as defined in Indiana Code 4-13-1-1) to place restrictions on public records: "that requires the public to obtain a license or pay copyright royalties for obtaining the right to inspect and copy the records unless otherwise provided by applicable statute; if the contract, obligation, license, or copyright unreasonably impairs the right of the public to inspect and copy the agency's public records".

=== Massachusetts ===
The Secretary of the Commonwealth of Massachusetts informs the public that:

Those records created by Massachusetts government agencies and institutions held by the Massachusetts Archives are not copyrighted and are available for public use. Copyright for materials submitted to state agencies may be held by the person or organization that created the document. Patrons are responsible for clearing copyright on such materials.

=== Minnesota ===
There are conflicting official legal opinions on the correct interpretation of state law, and courts have yet to rule on how to interpret the law. A state commissioner's statement from December 1994 reads, in part, "unless specified by the legislature, the public's right of access to and use of public government data cannot be curtailed by a government entity's claim of intellectual property rights in those data". The reading of that as meaning "public domain", however, is contradicted by this statement from December 1995 which comes from the Attorney General, claims to be of higher authority, and explicitly references the prior statement and clarifies that it should be read as applying to access to the data, and not the copyright of the data, and offers alternative phrasing for the above-quoted portion: "The department may not assert copyright ownership to deny members of the public their right "to inspect and copy public government data at reasonable times and places" under Minn. Stat. § 13.03, subd. 3 (1994)." A key question is how to interpret this statute, which reads:

Subd. 5.Copyright or patent of government data. A government entity may enforce copyright or acquire a patent for a computer software program or components of a program created by that government entity without statutory authority. If a government entity acquires a patent to a computer software program or component of a program, the data shall be treated as trade secret information under section 13.37.

For purposes of subd. 5, "Government entity" means a state agency, statewide system, or political subdivision. Political subdivisions include counties, cities, towns, school districts, and certain nonprofit corporations, each of which has authority under subd. 5 to enforce copyrights of works it has created, as does any state office, officer, department, division, bureau, board, commission, authority, district or agency of the state, the University of Minnesota, and the state itself.

=== Missouri ===
Some Missouri departments and commissions may hold copyright in their works. Missouri Revised Statute (RSMo) 630.095 states that executive departments may hold copyright for works for hire, whether works are made by department employees or by contractors. Further, RSMo 8.007 states that Missouri's State Capitol Commission may hold copyright and license works they create describing or depicting the Missouri capitol or capitol grounds.

=== New Jersey ===
New Jersey states that all documents originating from web sites of executive departments and non-independent agencies are "available to the public and anyone may view, copy or distribute State information found here without obligation to the State" unless the document specifically states otherwise. Likewise, all records obtained from the state, county, or local government entities in New Jersey via the state's Open Public Records Act (OPRA), per a 2009 decision of the New Jersey Supreme Court, may be reproduced including for commercial purposes.

According to the New Jersey Open Data Initiative Act (N.J.S.A 52:18A-234.5), all information listed on state agencies' open data web portals, "shall be treated as license-free, subject to reuse, and not subject to copyright restrictions". This effectively makes data published under this act in the public domain.

=== New York ===
Courts have ruled that in general, works of this state are subject to copyright restrictions.

=== North Carolina ===
North Carolina statute holds that "The public records and public information compiled by the agencies of North Carolina government or its subdivisions are the property of the people. Therefore, it is the policy of this State that the people may obtain copies of their public records and public information free or at minimal cost unless otherwise specifically provided by law." The State Library of North Carolina considers state documents within its collection to be in the public domain according to U.S. copyright law. Though state law in general describes state and local records as "property of the people", it describes some specific types of records that may have copyright held by the state. These include "archaeological resources which are collected, excavated or removed from State lands and associated records and data" and "original tapes, notes, discs or other records" created via "stenotype, shorthand, or stenomask equipment" as part of trial recording.

=== Pennsylvania ===
According to Pennsylvania statute, "The Department of General Services shall have the power, and its duty shall be… [t]o copyright, in the name of the Commonwealth, all publications of the Commonwealth, or of any department, board, or commission or officer thereof, including the State Reports, which under existing or future laws it shall be necessary to have copyrighted, and such other publications as the Secretary of Property and Supplies, with the approval of the Governor, shall deem it advisable to copyright."

=== Rhode Island ===
Rhode Island General Law § 38-2-3 states that "all records maintained or kept on file by any public body, whether or not those records are required by any law or by any rule or regulation, shall be public records and every person or entity shall have the right to inspect and/or copy those records at such reasonable time as may be determined by the custodian thereof." However, exceptions are made in Rhode Island General Law § 38-2-2(4) for classified materials, trade secrets, and other sensitive information.

=== South Carolina ===
The Supreme Court of South Carolina held in Seago v. Horry County that a South Carolina county can hold copyrights on government works.

=== Utah ===
The current public records law, the Government Records Access and Management Act (GRAMA), is found at Utah Code Ann. § 63G-2-101. All records created or maintained by a state governmental entity are the property of the state (Utah Code Ann. § 63A-12-105). Government entities may control their copyright by ordinance or policy (Utah Code Ann. § 63G-2-201).

=== Washington ===
Works created by the State of Washington are copyrighted. Works published by the Secretary of State of Washington are voluntarily released into the public domain. Article IV, Section 21 of the Washington State Constitution explicitly placed the opinions of the Supreme Court of Washington in the public domain in 1889.

== Government outside states ==
Some parts of the United States are not within U.S. states and instead derive their authority from federal acts of Congress. They have varying degrees of autonomy, which affects whether their governments' works are public domain works of the United States government, which the current Copyright Act of 1976 describes as "a work prepared by an officer or employee of the United States Government as part of that person's official duties".

Compendium of U.S. Copyright Office Practices, Third Edition (2014) gives guidance about which jurisdictions are, or are not the United States government:

- Works of the governments of the District of Columbia, the Commonwealth of Puerto Rico, and the "organized territories" (incorporated or unincorporated) are considered U.S. federal government works, this was affirmed by the U.S. Supreme Court in Georgia v. Public.Resource.Org, Inc.
- For the unorganized territories, "Domicile or first publication in any of the territorial areas under the jurisdiction of the U.S. government — other than the several states, the District of Columbia, and the Commonwealth of Puerto Rico, and the organized territories — does not confer eligibility for [copyright] registration. Such areas include the unorganized territories, the trust territories, and other possessions of the United States." Registration may be permitted, however, depending on the nationality of the individual. However, some older works in the unorganized territories may be copyrightable. Copyright renewal was required for works published or registered on or before December 31, 1963, but not for works published or registered after that date. "For renewal registration purposes, the United States comprises the States, the District of Columbia, the Commonwealth of Puerto Rico, Guam, U.S. Virgin Islands, Panama Canal Zone, America Samoa, and other trust territories. For the manufacturing requirements, unorganized areas under the jurisdiction of the United States (such as Guam, Panama Canal Zone, Virgin Islands, and American Samoa) are not considered a part of the United States."

== Advocacy for open licenses ==
Some organizations, such as Public.Resource.Org, have promoted the idea that works created by state governments of the United States should be placed in the public domain or released under open licenses, similar to the policy of the federal government of the United States under Title 17 of the United States Code. Unlike works of the United States federal government, which are automatically in the public domain if created by federal agencies, most works produced by state agencies, municipal governments, or public universities in the United States remain copyrighted by default. Supporters of reform argue that government information, especially materials funded by taxpayer dollars, should be freely available for reuse, distribution, and modification. Advocates suggest that state governments could adopt policies to default their works to the public domain or use Creative Commons licenses such as CC0 or CC BY. These licenses enable broader use of public sector content for purposes including civic technology, journalism, education, and scientific research. In some cases, state or local governments already publish works online under open terms, such as Florida. The use of open licenses and public domain dedications is often seen as consistent with the principles of open data, government transparency, and freedom of information in the United States. Broader legal support for public access also exists under the government edicts doctrine, which states that official legal materials such as statutes, judicial opinions, and administrative rulings cannot be copyrighted. This doctrine was upheld by the Supreme Court of the United States in the case of Georgia v. Public.Resource.Org, Inc., reinforcing the public’s right to access fundamental legal documents.

== See also ==
- Comparison of free and open-source software licenses
- Creative Commons licenses and List of free-content licenses
- List of U.S. state legal codes
- Bayh–Dole Act - legislation permitting ownership by contractors of inventions arising from federal government-funded research
