= Killing Castro (film) =

- Theatrical release poster
- Directed by: Eif Rivera
- Screenplay by: Thomas V. DeGrezia; Leon Hendrix III
- Produced by: Brad Feinstein; Christina Weiss Lurie
- Starring: Al Pacino; Diego Boneta; Xolo Maridueña; KiKi Layne; Alexander Ludwig; Ron Livingston; Kendrick Sampson; Nicole Beharie; Logan Marshall-Green; Titus Welliver; Paul Ben-Victor; Frankie Faison
- Cinematography: Zak Mulligan
- Edited by: Andrew Mondshein
- Production companies: Romulus Entertainment; Fourth and Twenty-Eight Films; CaliWood Pictures
- Distributed by: Lionsgate
- Release dates: June 9, 2026 (Tribeca Festival); December 11, 2026 (United States)
- Running time: 113 minutes
- Country: United States
- Language: English

Killing Castro is a 2026 American biographical drama film directed by Eif Rivera from a screenplay by Thomas V. DeGrezia and Leon Hendrix III. It stars Al Pacino, Diego Boneta, Xolo Maridueña, KiKi Layne, Alexander Ludwig, Ron Livingston, Kendrick Sampson, Nicole Beharie, Logan Marshall-Green, Titus Welliver, Frankie Faison, and Paul Ben-Victor.

== Cast ==
- Al Pacino as Robert Maheu
- Diego Boneta as Fidel Castro
- Xolo Maridueña as Leonel
- KiKi Layne as Ava
- Alexander Ludwig
- Ron Livingston
- Kendrick Sampson as Malcolm X
- Nicole Beharie
- Logan Marshall-Green as Johnny Roselli
- Titus Welliver
- Gil Perez-Abraham
- Paul Ben-Victor as Sam Giancana
- Frankie Faison as Love B. Woods, owner of the Hotel Theresa
- John Rubinstein as President Eisenhower
- Héctor Medina as Raúl Castro
- Ana Isabelle as Marita Lorenz
- Luis Antonio Ramos
- Eugene Alper as Nikita Khrushchev
- Ed Moran as Christian Herter
- Chris Tardio as Santo Trafficante Jr.
- Matthew Jacob as Alexander Alexeyev
- Taylor Shurte

== Production ==
In December 2023, it was announced that a biographical drama film based on the true events of Fidel Castro’s visit to New York City in 1960 was being made. Al Pacino, Diego Boneta, Xolo Maridueña, KiKi Layne, Alexander Ludwig, Ron Livingston, Kendrick Sampson, Nicole Beharie, Logan Marshall-Green, Titus Welliver, and Paul Ben-Victor rounded out the cast, with principal photography beginning that month.

== Release ==
Killing Castro screened in the industry market at the Toronto International Film Festival in September 2025. It premiered at the Tribeca Festival on June 9, 2026. The film is scheduled to be released in the United States on December 11, 2026, and then a week later on digital.
