= Killing of Kelly Thomas =

Man killed by police in 2011

- Kelly Thomas in 2002
- Date: July 5, 2011
- Time: 8:30 PM PDT (03:30 UTC)
- Location: Fullerton, California, United States
- Type: Homicide by asphyxiation, beating, police killing
- Participants: Fullerton Police Department officers Manuel Ramos, Jay Cicinelli, and Joseph Wolfe
- Outcome: Officers fired; Ramos and Cicinelli acquitted at criminal trial; Officers and acquitting jurors doxed by Anonymous; Wrongful death suits settled
- Deaths: Kelly Thomas, aged 37
- Accused: Manuel Ramos; Jay Cicinelli; Joseph Wolfe
- Charges: Ramos: Second-degree murder Ramos, Ciconelli, Wolfe: Involuntary manslaughter Cicinelli, Wolfe: Excessive force
- Verdict: Ramos, Cicinelli: Not guilty of all charges Wolfe: Charges dropped
- Litigation: Wrongful death civil suits against the city by Thomas’s mother and father settled for $5.9 million

Kelly Thomas (April 5, 1974 – July 10, 2011) was a homeless white man diagnosed with schizophrenia who lived on the streets of Fullerton, California. He died five days after being severely beaten by six members of the Fullerton Police Department, whom he encountered on July 5, 2011, in what was later described as "one of the worst police beatings in [US] history."

Medical records show that bones in his face were broken and he choked on his own blood. The coroner concluded that compression of the thorax made it impossible for Thomas to breathe normally and deprived his brain of oxygen. Officer Manuel Ramos was charged with one count of second-degree murder and one count of involuntary manslaughter; Corporal Jay Cicinelli and Officer Joseph Wolfe were each charged with one count of felony involuntary manslaughter and one count of excessive force. All three pleaded not guilty.

A judge declined to dismiss the charges against the officers in January 2013, finding that "a reasonable person could infer that the use of force was excessive and unreasonable." An appeals court judge also denied a request to overturn the lower court's decision. On January 13, 2014, Ramos and Cicinelli were found not guilty of all charges, while the trial for Wolfe was pending. Following the verdict for the two officers, the district attorney's office announced it would not pursue the case against Wolfe. On January 17, 2014, charges against Wolfe were dropped.

As summarized by The Orange County Register in 2020, "the name Kelly Thomas has become synonymous with police brutality and a rallying cry for reforms in how law enforcement treats the homeless." The incident motivated various changes in the treatment of homeless and mentally ill persons in Fullerton and elsewhere in California.

== Background ==
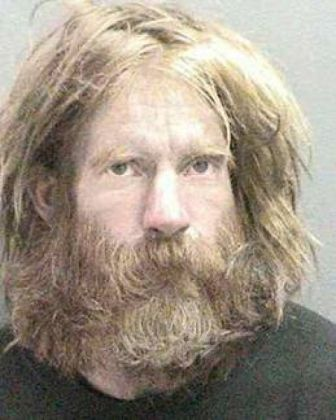
Kelly Thomas as he appeared in a 2009 booking photo released by Fullerton PD

Kelly Thomas was born April 5, 1974, to Ron Thomas, a former Orange County Sheriff's deputy, and Cathy Thomas. Thomas, who was diagnosed with schizophrenia, was a "fixture" among Fullerton's homeless population. The death of Thomas has sparked debate about systemic reforms in treatment of the mentally ill.

Between 1990 and 2011, Thomas had 92 encounters with the police. These encounters ranged from minor infractions such as trespassing to a guilty plea in an assault with a deadly weapon case sixteen years prior.

Manuel Ramos, one of the police officers who would later be arrested on murder charges for his beating of Thomas, had been put on a performance improvement plan due to having made comments in January 2010 that were found to violate the standards of the Fullerton police department.

== Incident ==
Full surveillance video from Fullerton Transportation Center depicting the beating

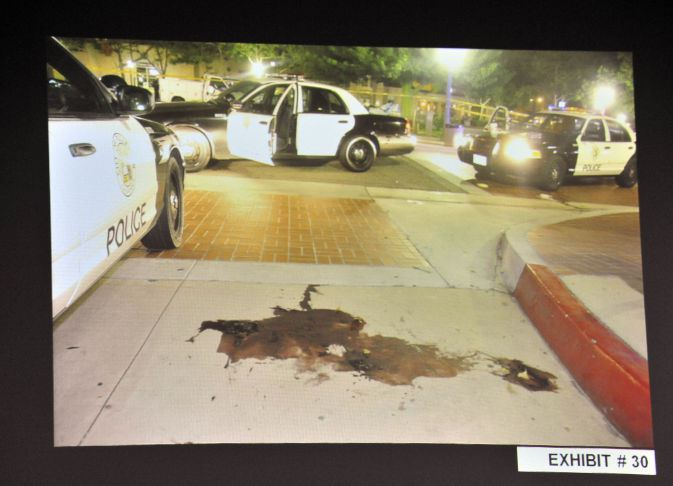
The crime scene in the immediate aftermath of the beating

Kelly Thomas, after the attack from the officers of the Fullerton, California Police Department

On July 5, 2011, at about 8:30 p.m., officers of the Fullerton Police Department responded to a call (later proved to be a false report) from the management of the Slidebar that someone was vandalizing cars near the Fullerton Transportation Center. While investigating, they encountered the shirtless and disheveled Thomas and attempted to search him. According to statements given by the officers, Thomas was uncooperative and resisted when they attempted to search him, so backup was called. "Now you see my fists?" officer Manuel Ramos asked Thomas while slipping on a pair of latex gloves. "Yeah, what about them?" Thomas responded. "They are getting ready to fuck you up," said Ramos, to which Thomas replied, "Start punching, dude". A video of the event surfaced. Thomas can be seen being uncooperative with the officers, but sitting and being non-aggressive. After the officers grab Thomas to arrest him for stolen mail they apparently found, Thomas can be heard repeatedly screaming in pain while officers are heard repeatedly asking him to place his arms behind his back. He audibly responds "Okay, I'm sorry!" and "I'm trying!" while the officers stretch his arm back. The police officers claim that, unable to get Thomas to comply with the requests, they used a taser on him (up to five times according to a witness statement, and the video footage), and in the video Thomas can be heard screaming for his father. Six officers were involved in subduing Thomas, who was unarmed. At one point, Officer Ramos can be heard saying, "I just smashed his face to hell," after repeatedly hitting Thomas with the blunt end of his flashlight. Thomas was initially taken to St. Jude Medical Center in Fullerton but was transferred immediately to the UC Irvine Medical Center with severe injuries to his head, face, and neck. One of the paramedics testified that he was first instructed to attend to a police officer's minor injury and then noticed Thomas lying unconscious in a pool of blood.

Orange County District Attorney Tony Rackauckas gave a detailed account of the events during a press conference on September 21, 2011. Using digital audio recording devices carried by the officers, surveillance video from a pole camera at the Fullerton Transportation Center, and other evidence, Rackauckas provided evidence that Thomas did comply with orders from Ramos. Rackauckas went on to describe how Thomas begged for his life, before being struck repeatedly by the officers. He was admitted to the hospital, slipped into a coma, and his parents removed him from life support five days later on July 10, 2011, without his regaining consciousness.

== Aftermath ==
The story of his beating broke shortly before his death. An investigation into the beating was undertaken by the Orange County district attorney starting on July 7, 2011, and later the FBI became involved. The decision to involve the FBI was praised by the American Civil Liberties Union, which stated that the Orange County district attorney had an "abysmal" record when investigating shootings with police involvement.

Initial reports claimed that Thomas had been very combative with officers and two had suffered broken bones. Later, the police department confirmed that no officers had suffered any broken bones, and that no one other than Thomas had any significant injuries. Department supervisors were criticized for allowing the involved officers to watch the video of the incident before writing their reports. In 2020, it was also revealed supervisors had subsequently made changes to these reports.

On July 18, 2011, a large protest outside the Fullerton Police Department was organized by several people, including the victim's father, Ron Thomas.

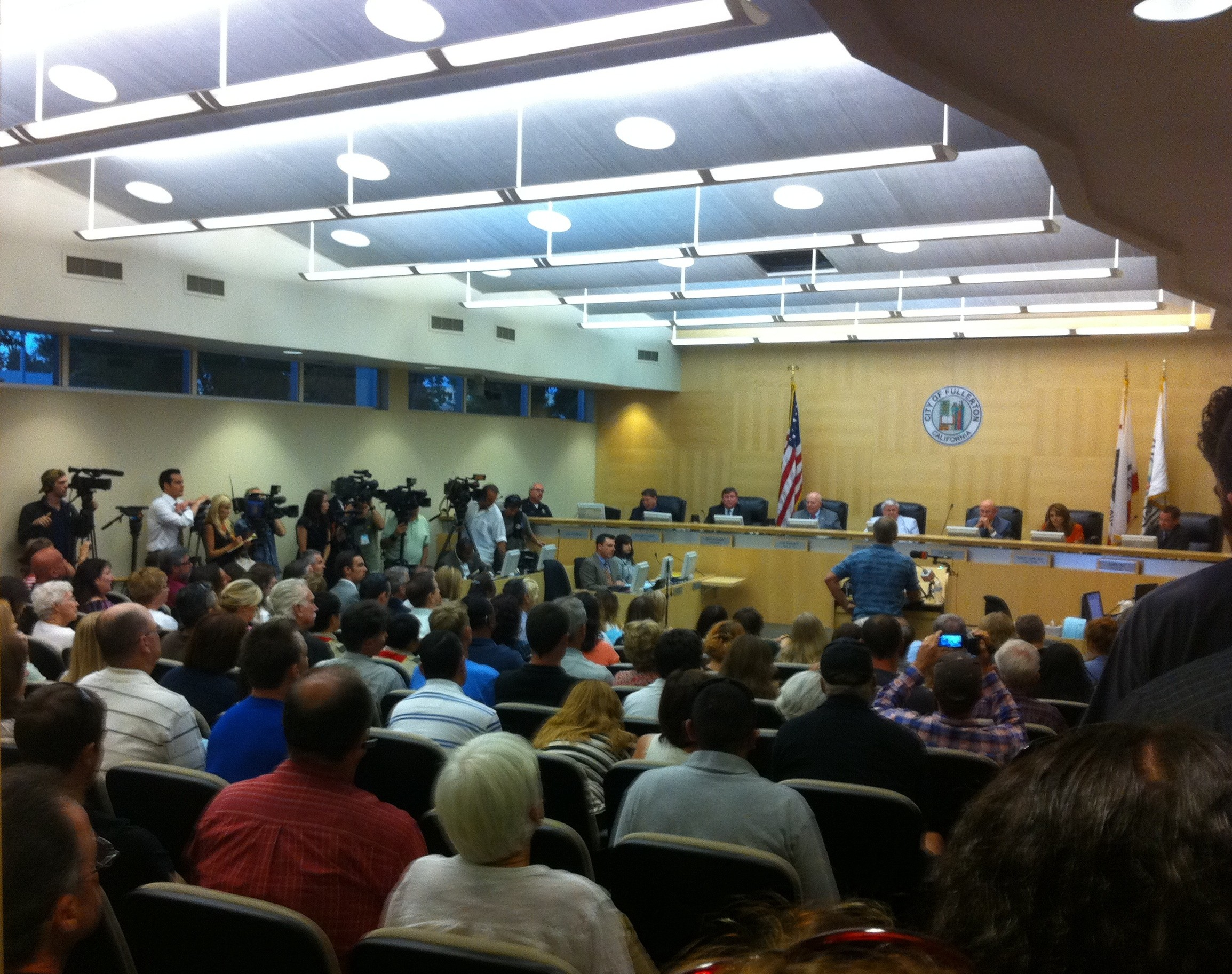
Ron Thomas speaks to the Fullerton City Council and the media

On August 2, 2011, many members of the public spoke out about the beating at the biweekly city council meeting at the Fullerton City Hall. Over 70 members of the public spoke to the city council, the vast majority of whom criticized the police. Among the speakers was Ron Thomas, the father of Kelly Thomas, as well as Kelly Thomas's stepmother. The public comment session lasted for approximately three hours. The city attorney emphasized that the city council could not respond to the comments, however following the public comment period discussion was given to provide clarification on the city's policy regarding the mentally ill. In addition, Tony Bushala, a local developer and conservative activist, announced plans to recall three members of the city council thought to have responded insufficiently to the beating, which succeeded the following year.

On August 6, 2011, a large street protest was held outside of the Fullerton City Hall. Activists at that protest, which was attended by hundreds of people, called for the release of a surveillance video shot by cameras installed at the bus depot and carried signs with slogans like "Jail All Killer Cops" and "End Police Brutality."

=== Criminal charges ===
In late September 2011, the officers involved were arrested on murder charges. Local law enforcement personnel showed support by raising money for their bail and criminal defense.

Thirty days after the incident all six officers involved in the beating were placed on administrative leave with pay and benefits intact. Several people, including two members of the Fullerton City Council, called for the resignation of police Chief Michael Sellers, who was later placed on medical leave in August 2011 for undisclosed reasons. Sellers continued his medical leave for 7 months and resigned on February 18, 2012, having never returned to work. 19,948 people signed an online petition calling for the firing of all six police officers that were present during the beating.

In an October 2011 televised interview with PBS SoCal, Fullerton City Councilman Bruce Whitaker stated his belief that there was a cover-up of the beating of Thomas within the police department and that the six officers involved in the beating falsified their reports on the incident.

A preliminary hearing to determine if there is sufficient evidence for a trial was held on May 9, 2012. The court ordered that two of the police officers involved will stand trial. Manuel Ramos was charged with second-degree murder and involuntary manslaughter, and Jay Cicinelli was charged with involuntary manslaughter and felony use of excessive force. Both officers pleaded not guilty at the second arraignment on July 13, 2012. Attempts by the defendants to dismiss the charges were denied. In September 2012, Officer Joseph Wolfe was indicted on charges of involuntary manslaughter and use of excessive force.

Trials for Cicinelli and Ramos were scheduled to begin October 18, 2013, but actually began on December 2, 2013. On January 13, 2014, Manuel Ramos was acquitted of second-degree murder and involuntary manslaughter in the 2011 death of Thomas. Jay Cicinelli was acquitted of involuntary manslaughter and excessive use of force. After the verdicts, the District Attorney's office announced that it would not proceed with Wolfe's trial.

The protests picked up again after the acquittals. On January 18, 2014, 14 people were arrested for protesting after ignoring a dispersal order from the police.

On January 23, 2017, federal prosecutors announced that they would not bring charges against former officers Ramos, Cicinelli and Wolfe for violating Thomas' civil rights.

=== Slidebar Kitchen involvement ===
In June 2012, Michael Reeves, a former employee of the Slidebar Rock-N-Roll Kitchen, filed a lawsuit for wrongful termination against Jeremy Popoff related to the beating. The Slidebar, which is owned by Popoff, the guitarist for Lit, was the source of the call that caused police to report to the area and confront Thomas. Reeves, a bouncer at the establishment, made statements to investigators claiming the Slidebar had a policy to do "anything necessary" to keep loiterers out of the area and that his manager lied about Thomas breaking into cars when calling the police to get them to respond more quickly. He further claimed that Thomas was only loitering in the area that night and not causing trouble. Soon after making statements to investigators about what he saw that night he claimed his managers were "furious at him for it" and slowly started taking away his responsibilities, culminating with his firing two months later. Reeves also claimed that Popoff wanted everyone working at the Slidebar to act as if the "Slidebar had nothing to do" with the beating of Thomas, and that his refusal to echo these statements is the chief reason for his firing. Eric Dubin, an attorney representing the Slidebar and Popoff, claimed the suit was without merit and that it should be quickly dismissed. Dubin claimed that "This whole thing is all copy from blogs and sold to some lawyer" and that, while the call did originate from the Slidebar, "that she [the manager] never used the phrase 'breaking into cars.'" Dubin further claimed that "Everything in that lawsuit is 100 percent false" and the real reason Reeve was fired was because of a confrontation with a manager in front of customers. On June 12, 2012, Ron Thomas organized a small gathering outside of the Slidebar to protest the false report made to police. Thomas and Popoff spoke at the event and Thomas later said that if the report was correct, "then I have no beef", but that if there were any inconsistencies, then "I have to do what I have to do".

One day after this statement, on June 13, 2012, after months of denials, Slidebar owner Jeremy Popoff stated on KFI's John and Ken Show that one of his employees did, in fact, call police the night Kelly Thomas was beaten. He declined to say what the employee reported, citing the criminal investigation into Thomas' death, but said a recording of the call had been reviewed by the District Attorney's Office and other investigators. Popoff and his lawyer denied the claims of an anti-homeless policy during a press conference.

The issue was eventually resolved in a settlement.

=== Cause of death ===
On September 21, 2011, Orange County district attorney Tony Rackauckas held a press conference to announce the results of the investigation. Rackauckas announced that according to the Orange County coroner, the cause of death was "asphyxia caused by mechanical chest compression with blunt cranial-facial injuries sustained during physical altercation with law enforcement." Rackauckas said Thomas died because of the force of the officers on his chest, which made it impossible for him to breathe, causing Thomas to become unconscious. He then became comatose, and he died when taken off life support five days later.

According to Rackauckas, the coroner stated that the injuries to Thomas' face and head contributed to his death. Also contributing to his death were brain injuries, facial and rib fractures, and the extensive bruising and abrasions he suffered during the beating, which left him lying in a "growing pool of blood", Rackauckas said. The toxicology report shows that Thomas had no illicit drugs or alcohol in his system. Thomas was bleeding severely, and struggled while pleading, "I can't breathe", and "Dad, help me." The DA stated that the officers did not reduce their level of force during the nearly 10-minute assault.

In contrast, Dr. Gary Vilke, a professor of clinical emergency medicine at UC San Diego, testified for the defense during the trial. He had investigated in-custody deaths for 20 years and has published studies on "mechanical compression." He testified, "I know he was breathing when the officers got off him because he was still talking." "As far as the cause of death, it's not asphyxiation." The defense also implied medical treatment could have played a part in Thomas's death (hospital records reportedly showed that a tube placed down his windpipe to assist his breathing had been pushed too far). The prosecution dismissed these claims, saying they did not apply and their value was not great enough.

=== Civil lawsuits by parents ===
Within days after the incident, Ron Thomas, the father of Kelly Thomas, retained noted personal injury and civil rights attorney Garo Mardirossian to represent him in a civil action against the City of Fullerton and the involved officers. Mardirossian held several press conferences to address bringing criminal charges against Officer Manuel Ramos, Corporal Jay Cicinelli, and Officer Joseph Wolfe, and the civil lawsuit filed against the city. These press conferences aired locally, nationally, and internationally, heightening public interest, and imposing pressure on the Orange County District Attorney to file criminal charges.

On May 16, 2012, press reports indicated that the Fullerton City Council had agreed to pay Thomas' mother, Cathy Thomas, one million dollars as a settlement of her civil complaints against the city. This did not impact the separate civil actions by Thomas' father or the criminal trial.

Despite the subsequent verdicts in favor of Ramos and Cicinelli, Mardirossian obtained a $4.9 million settlement in the suit by Ron Thomas just before Ramos, the chief perpetrator, was to testify in the civil jury trial. The settlement precluded the officers who were fired from being re-hired by Fullerton Police Department.

=== Recall election ===
The recall election against Don Bankhead, F. Dick Jones, and Pat McKinley, three members of the city council thought to have responded insufficiently to the beating, qualified on the ballot in February 2012 and was scheduled for June 5, 2012, consolidated with the statewide primary election. All three council members were successfully recalled by Fullerton residents. Each was voted out by an almost identical majority of nearly 66%. Their replacements were: Travis Kiger, a planning commissioner and blogger for the site Friends for Fullerton's Future, who filled Jones' term, which expired December 4, 2012; Greg Sebourn, a land surveyor, who filled Bankhead's term, which also ended December 4; and attorney Doug Chaffee, who filled McKinley's term, which ended December 2, 2012. All were sworn into office in July 2012. Tony Bushala, a leading organizer of the Fullerton recall election, said he was seeking accountability for Kelly Thomas' death. The city's other two council members did not face a recall.

=== Employment termination ===
On July 3, 2012, Ramos' employment was terminated. According to a statement issued by Fullerton Police, Joe Wolfe was no longer employed by the department as of July 16, 2012. Jay Cicinelli was no longer employed by Fullerton Police as of July 20, 2012.

Wolfe and Cicinelli sued over their termination in the Orange County Superior Court seeking restoration of employment and back pay, alleging that Fullerton city council had been unconstitutionally biased against them. On Monday, Oct. 26, 2020, Orange County Superior Court Judge David A. Hoffer upheld their firing. In March 2021, Wolfe and Cicinelli separately filed paperwork dropping any further legal attempt to recover their jobs.

=== Response by Anonymous ===
In August 2011, the Internet activist group Anonymous demanded that the officers involved be prosecuted, the Fullerton Police Chief resign, and that Thomas's family be awarded $5 million in compensation; they threatened to shut down the Fullerton municipal website if their demands were not met. In January 2014, after the police officers involved were acquitted, Anonymous released the personal addresses of the officers, as well as the identities of the jurors. On January 18 and 19, Anonymous disabled several websites belonging to or run by Fullerton Police and municipality.

=== 2020 document release ===
In May 2020, the city of Fullerton published 2,400 pages of documents about the Kelly Thomas case, as required by the recently enacted SB 1421 law.

== See also ==
- List of killings by law enforcement officers in the United States
- Police brutality in the United States
- Killing of Tyre Nichols
- Beating of Rodney King
