= Fullerton Police Department =

Police department in Fullerton, California

Coordinates: 33°52′14″N 117°55′41″W

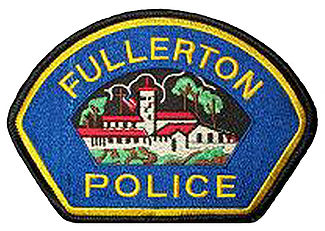
- Patch of the Fullerton Police Department
- Abbreviation: FPD

Agency overview
- Formed: 1904; 122 years ago
- Annual budget: $54.7 million USD (2023)

Jurisdictional structure
- Operations jurisdiction: United States
- General nature: Local civilian police

Operational structure
- Sworn members: 125
- Unsworn members: 71
- Divisions: Uniform Division; Service Division; Detective Division

The Fullerton Police Department of Fullerton, California, was established in 1904 when the city was incorporated. The Fullerton Police Department currently employs 125 sworn officers and 78 civilian employees. It has a budget of about $66.7 million. The current chief is Jon Radus. The department has a Uniform Division, a Service Division, and a Detective Division all commanded by officers in the rank of captain.

== History ==
In April 2003, press reports indicated that two unnamed Fullerton police officers were suspended without pay for 60 hours while two more senior supervisors were suspended for 12.5 hours. The officers had been called to an address because of a possible suicide of a woman. One officer squatted next to the unconscious victim, passed wind and remarked, "This ought to wake her up." The second officer climbed into bed with the woman and pretended to lick her.

On the night of March 17, 2010, a number of Fullerton police personnel arrested an unnamed college student. The student filed a complaint that the police threatened him, broke his fingers, and tortured him before stealing his iPod and $140. An internal investigation by the department confirmed that Officer Cary Tong had in fact violated department policy and broke the man's finger.

On June 1, 2010, Fullerton police conducted a lineup of assault suspects on a local street. The victim sat in a police car about 25 feet from the three men and identified the one she thought had attacked her. The police then arrested Emmanuel Martinez instead of the man she indicated. Martinez was held in jail for five months until the matter was sorted out.

In the same month, Officer Kenton Hampton objected to Edward Quinonez observing him conduct a traffic stop. He arrested Quinonez claiming he was intoxicated. In the course of the arrest, Quinonez was injured in the head. hospital reports and taped evidence showed he was not intoxicated. In July 2013, the city agreed to pay the man $25,000 to settle the matter. Officer Hampton was present at the death of Kelly Thomas in July but was not charged.

On the night of October 20, 2010, Fullerton police officers burst into the house of Robyn Nordell without warning. They had entered the wrong house while looking for someone. The four officers did not report the mistake to the police department for five days. The matter was settled out of court. In October of the next year, the police chief publicly apologized.

In June 2011, press reports indicated that a Fullerton police officer, Kelly Janeth Mejia had been arrested at Miami International Airport after stealing an iPad at a security checkpoint. The officer was placed on paid leave by the department. She was fired in October, although the department would not make a public statement as to why she was discharged. She admitted her guilt in court in February 2012 and was sentenced to pay $100 in court costs, a $250 charitable donation and a requirement to attend a "theft class." In July 2011, Fullerton police officer Todd Alan Major pleaded guilty to two charges involving embezzlement and theft to fuel his drug habit. He was sentenced to six months in jail.

In August 2011, Officer Alber Rincon was the subject of a federal lawsuit by two women claiming the officer sexually attacked them in the back seat of his police car. On July 9, the department informed the officer they intended to fire him. At this point, he was no longer to allowed to wear his badge. The city later moved to settle the case. U.S. District Judge Andrew J. Guilford wrote that "Requiring Rincon to attend 'pat-down' training is a weak sauce that does nothing to hide the unpleasant taste of complicity...At the end of the day, the City put Rincon back onto the streets to continue arresting women despite a pattern of sexual harassment allegations."

In 2011, Fullerton police responded to reports of a man trying to break into cars. They encountered Kelly Thomas, 37, a local mentally ill transient. Thomas was an unarmed local homeless man who was beaten by six officers and stunned six times with a taser. Thomas died five days later. That same year, two officers were charged, and were acquitted of all charges in 2014.

In January 2012, press reports indicated the Fullerton Police Department was the subject of a lawsuit concerning tow trucks in the city. The suit claimed that officers systematically harassed and intimidated tow truck drivers from companies not preferred by the department.

In March 2012, press reports indicated a Fullerton police corporal was charged with destroying his digital audio recorder after the apparent jailhouse suicide of a person he had arrested. Corporal Vincent Thomas Mater detained Dean Francis Gochenour for driving under the influence and took him to the Fullerton jail. Two hours later Gochenour was found hanging dead in his holding cell. When it was found Mater's recording device had been damaged, he was placed on paid leave and later fired. In November 2012, Mater pleaded guilty to misdemeanor counts of destruction of property and vandalism and was sentenced to probation.

== Chiefs ==
| Date | Chief of Department |
|---|---|
| 1904 July | Marshal Charles E. Ruddock |
| 1910 April | Marshal Roderick D. Stone |
| 1912 November | Marshal William French |
| 1918 August | Chief Vernon Myers |
| 1921 August | Chief Arthur L. Eeles |
| 1925 April | Chief O. W. Wilson |
| 1925 December | Chief Thomas K. Winter |
| 1927 December | Chief James M. Pearson |
| 1940 April | Chief John C. Gregory |
| 1951 February | Chief Ernest E. Garner |
| 1957 November | Chief Wayne H. Bornhoft |
| 1977 September | Chief Martin Hairabedian |
| 1987 March | Chief Philip Goehring |
| 1993 March | Chief Patrick McKinley |
| 2009 April | Chief Michael Sellers* |
| 2012 January | Acting Chief Dan Hughes |
| 2013 January | Chief Dan Hughes |
| 2017 August | Chief David Hendricks |
| 2020 | Chief Robert Dunn |
| 2024 February | Chief Jon Radus |

- Sellers began paid medical leave in 2011 and retired in February 2012. Kevin Hamilton was named acting chief in his place.

== Fallen officers ==
Since the establishment of the Fullerton Police Department, two officers have died in the line of duty.

| Officer | Date of death | Details |
|---|---|---|
| Officer Jerry Scott Hatch | Monday, June 30, 1975 | Vehicular assault |
| Officer Tommy De La Rosa | Thursday, June 21, 1990 | Gunfire |

== See also ==
- List of law enforcement agencies in California
