= 2004 California Proposition 59 =

Freedom-of-information referendum

Proposition 59 (or Senate Constitutional Amendment 1) was an amendment of the Constitution of California that introduced freedom of information or "sunshine" provisions. It was proposed by the California Legislature and overwhelmingly approved by the voters in an initiative held as part of the November 2004 elections.

== Election results ==
Proposition 59 was approved by the State Legislature as Senate Constitutional Amendment 1 of the 2003–2004 Regular Session (Resolution Chapter 1, Statutes of 2004). It was adopted by the California State Senate by a vote of 34-0 and the State Assembly by 78–0. It was then put to voters as a ballot proposition on 2 November 2004. It passed with 9,334,852 (83.4%) votes in favor and 1,870,146 (16.6%) against.

Proposition 59 results by county Yes: 80–90%; 70–80%

== Text ==
The amendment adds to the state constitution Article I, Section 3 (b). Section 3 (a) is the provision of the Declaration of Rights that guarantees the right to freedom of assembly, the right to petition the government and the right to instruct one's elected representatives. The amendment added to these rights the following provisions:

(1) The people have the right of access to information concerning the conduct of the people’s business, and, therefore, the meetings of public bodies and the writings of public officials and agencies shall be open to public scrutiny.

(2) A statute, court rule, or other authority, including those in effect on the effective date of this subdivision, shall be broadly construed if it furthers the people’s right of access, and narrowly construed if it limits the right of access. A statute, court rule, or other authority adopted after the effective date of this subdivision that limits the right of access shall be adopted with findings demonstrating the interest protected by the limitation and the need for protecting that interest.

(3) Nothing in this subdivision supersedes or modifies the right of privacy guaranteed by Section 1 or affects the construction of any statute, court rule, or other authority to the extent that it protects that right to privacy, including any statutory procedures governing discovery or disclosure of information concerning the official performance or professional qualifications of a peace officer.

(4) Nothing in this subdivision supersedes or modifies any provision of this Constitution, including the guarantees that a person may not be deprived of life, liberty, or property without due process of law, or denied equal protection of the laws, as provided in Section 7.

(5) This subdivision does not repeal or nullify, expressly or by implication, any constitutional or statutory exception to the right of access to public records or meetings of public bodies that is in effect on the effective date of this subdivision, including, but not limited to, any statute protecting the confidentiality of law enforcement and prosecution records.

(6) Nothing in this subdivision repeals, nullifies, supersedes, or modifies protections for the confidentiality of proceedings and records of the Legislature, the Members of the Legislature, and its employees, committees, and caucuses provided by Section 7 of Article IV, state law, or legislative rules adopted in furtherance of those provisions; nor does it affect the scope of permitted discovery in judicial or administrative proceedings regarding deliberations of the Legislature, the Members of the Legislature, and its employees, committees, and caucuses.

== Official summary ==
The official summary of Proposition 59 states that the purpose of the amendment is to

Provide right of public access to meetings of government bodies and writings of government officials.

Provide that statutes and rules furthering public access shall be broadly construed, or narrowly construed if limiting access.

Require future statutes and rules limiting access to contain findings justifying necessity of those limitations.

Preserve constitutional rights including rights of privacy, due process, equal protection; expressly preserves existing constitutional and statutory limitations restricting access to certain meetings and records of government bodies and officials, including law enforcement and prosecution records.

Exempts Legislature's records and meetings.

The Legislative Analyst's Estimate predicted only "potential minor annual state and local government costs to make additional information available to the public".

== Explanation of provisions ==
According to The Reporters Committee for Freedom of the Press the effects of the amendment may be summarized roughly as follows:

- First, it mandates access to government records and meetings of government bodies, and elevates this right of access to constitutional stature. Thus, all newly enacted state laws and administrative regulations must conform to the Amendment's provisions. The effect is to leave no doubt as to the importance of access to the people of California, and consequently to render ineffective the assertion, often made by government agencies to defeat access, that access in a particular case serves no public purpose. Similarly, it strengthens the case for access in cases where, under existing statutory exemptions, records can be withheld when the public's interest in non-disclosure clearly outweighs the public's interest in disclosure. This is so because most interests in non-disclosure are not constitutionally based and thus will be of significantly less importance when weighed against a now-constitutional right of access.
- Second, unlike statutory rights of access under California's Public Records Act and The Ralph M. Brown Act, the Sunshine Amendment applies not just to the executive branch of government but to the judicial and legislative branches as well. While the Amendment expressly reserves existing protections for proceedings and records of the Legislature and rules adopted in furtherance of those protections, and maintains all other preexisting constitutional and statutory exemptions to the right of access to public records and meetings, these branches of government are now within the mantle of the public's constitutional right of access. In practice, what new rights of access this may bring remains to be determined, but arguably the right would include access to records and meetings of both the Legislature and the Judiciary not currently exempt from disclosure under existing authority.
- Third, the Sunshine Amendment requires that court rules, statutes, or other authority be construed broadly when they further the public's right of access, and narrowly when they limit that right.
- Fourth, when public bodies adopt new laws, court rules, or other authority that limit the right of access, they must now make express findings demonstrating the interest purportedly protected and the need for protecting that interest. Thus, the adoption of agency rules and regulations, for example, intended to impede public access will no longer be allowed on the whim of the agency's governing body but will require actual on-the-record findings demonstrating the need for secrecy and demonstrating how the exemption will achieve that need—findings similar to that required by a court before sealing a court record or closing a court proceeding.
- Lastly, the Sunshine Amendment leaves intact the right of privacy guaranteed by the constitution by clarifying that it does not supersede or modify the existing constitutional right of privacy. And, disconcerting for proponents of access, the Amendment expressly does not affect existing statutory protections afforded peace officers over information concerning their official performance or professional qualifications.

== See also ==
- California Public Records Act
