= California Public Records Act =

Freedom-of-information law in California, US

California State Legislature
- Long title: An act to amend Sections 3020, 7017, and 19432 of the Business and Professions Code, to amend Sections 15490 and 16480.1 of the Government Code, to amend Section 11770.5 of the Insurance Code, to add Section 10207 to, and Chapter 3.5 (commencing with Section 6250) to Division 7 of Title 1 of the Government Code, and to repeal Sections 1208, and 20473 of the Agricultural Code, Sections 2122, 2713.5, 2852.5, 4013, 4809.1, 5014, 6307.5, 7207.5, 7611, 8010, 8919.2, 9009.5, 9536, 9936, 10060, 18626.7, and 19035.10 of the Business and Professions Code, Article 1 (commencing with Section 1887) of Chapter 3 of Title 2 of Part 4 of, and Sections 1892, 1893, and 1894 of the Code of Civil Procedure, Sections 113, 13867, 23607, 24.156, 26008 and 31008 of the Education Code, Sections 105, 732, 1326, and 14107 of the Fish and Game Code, Sections 1227, 8013, 83.40.8, 8440.8, 10207, 13913, 15487, 20137, and 65020.10 of the Government Code, Sections 1153.2, 1262, 1356, 1711, and 3805 of the Harbors and Navigation Code, Sections 103.2, 431.4, 1110.2, 13141.2, 17940, and 18917 of the Health and Safety Code, Sections 71.2, 137, 147, and 3092 of the Labor Code, Sections 538, 638, 666, 4567, 9065.2, and 9072 of the Public Resources Code, Section 21209 of the Public Utilities Code, Sections 2605 and 3009 of the Vehicle Code, Sections 13008 and 20034 of the Water Code, and Chapter 842 of the Statutes of 1959, relating to public records.
- Enacted: August 29, 1968
- Signed by: Ronald Reagan

The California Public Records Act (Statutes of 1968, Chapter 1473; currently codified as Division 10 of Title 1 of the California Government Code) was a law passed by the California State Legislature and signed by governor Ronald Reagan in 1968 requiring inspection or disclosure of governmental records to the public upon request, unless exempted by law.

The law is similar to the Freedom of Information Act, except that "the people have the right of access to information concerning the conduct of the people's business" is enshrined in Article 1 of the California Constitution due to California Proposition 59 (the Sunshine Amendment, 2004).

== Purpose ==
When the legislature enacted CPRA, it expressly declared that "access to information concerning the conduct of the people's business is a fundamental and necessary right of every person in this state." Indeed, in California "access to government records has been deemed a fundamental interest of citizenship" and has emphasized that "maximum disclosure of the conduct of governmental operations [is] to be promoted by the act." By promoting prompt public access to government records, the CPRA is "intended to safeguard the accountability of government to the public." As the California Supreme Court recognized in CBS v. Block:

Implicit in a democratic process is the notion that government should be accountable for its actions. In order to verify accountability, individuals must have access to government files. Such access permits checks against the arbitrary exercise of official power and secrecy in the political process.

== Public records and exemptions ==
In accordance with this policy, public records are broadly defined to include "any writing containing information relating to the conduct of a public's business prepared, owned, used or retained by any state or local agency regardless of physical form or characteristic[.]" Citing with approval an even broader definition of public records adopted by the California Attorney General, another court has stated:

This definition is intended to cover every conceivable kind of record that is involved in the governmental process and will pertain to any new form of record-keeping instrument as it is developed. Only purely personal information unrelated to 'the conduct of the public's business' could be considered exempt from this definition, i.e., the shopping list phoned from home, the letter to a public officer from a friend which is totally void of reference to governmental activities.

Moreover, unless the public records of a local agency are exempt from the provisions of the CPRA, they must be made available for public inspection. Exemptions must be narrowly construed and the public agency bears the burden of proving that an exemption applies.

Most of the exemptions under the CPRA are set forth under Section 7921 and are specific as to certain records or types of records, but under Section 7922 a general exemption exists where, on the facts of the particular case, "the public interest served by not making the record public clearly outweighs the public interest served by disclosure of the record". In reviewing the propriety of an agency decision to withhold records, a court is charged with ascertaining whether nondisclosure was justified under either of these statutes.

Because the CPRA was modeled after the federal Freedom of Information Act ("FOIA"), 5 U.S.C. Section 552 et seq, courts may look to case law under FOIA in construing the CPRA.

The California Supreme Court held that when a public official or employee uses a personal account and/or device to communicate about the conduct of public business, such as e-mails or text messages, the applicable writings may be subject to disclosure under the California Public Records Act.

== Orders and appeals ==
To facilitate prompt public access to public records, court orders either directing disclosure of public records or supporting an agency's decision of nondisclosure are immediately reviewable by an appellate court by way of a petition seeking issuance of an extraordinary writ. In 1991, the California Supreme Court made clear that under this writ procedure, trial court orders are reviewable on their merits. Thus, when a trial court order under the CPRA is reviewed by an appellate court, the independent review standard is employed for legal issues and factual findings made by the trial court will be upheld if they are based on substantial evidence.

== Changes to Act ==
On November 2, 2004, California voters overwhelmingly approved Proposition 59. Commonly called the Sunshine Amendment, it added Article I, Section 3(b) to the California Constitution, which reads in part:

The people have the right of access to information concerning the conduct of the people's business, and, therefore, the meetings of public bodies and the writings of public officials and agencies shall be open to public scrutiny.

In 2013, as part of budget negotiations, the Legislature approved a plan to make certain provisions in the Act optional for local agencies. The move was done in order to save "tens of millions of dollars" in state reimbursements to local agencies that comply with the Act, according to Legislative Analyst's Office projections.

The changes were added to the 2013 budget as rider bills AB 76 and SB 71, the former of which was vetoed by Jerry Brown. According to the bills, local agencies would no longer be required to provide the following, but are encouraged to follow them as "best practices":

- Respond to a public record request within 10 days
- Provide electronic records in its native format
- Provide a reason for denying a request

Open government advocates and several California newspapers came out strongly against the measure. Jim Ewert, general counsel of the California Newspaper Publisher's Association, called the move "the worst assault on the public's right to know I have seen in my 18 years of doing this." Several newspapers, including the Oakland Tribune, Fresno Bee, and Visalia Times-Delta, published editorials against the changes.

Because of the outcry from the media, state leaders backed down within the week and reversed the changes. The Assembly passed a measure to revoke that provision in the budget bill, which Jerry Brown signed into law.

In September 2013, the legislature approved a constitutional amendment proposal, authored by state senator Mark Leno, which would incorporate the Public Records Act into the California State Constitution. The amendment clarifies that local governments must comply with requests for publicly available documents, and requires local governments to pay the costs of those requests in full. The proposed amendment went to the voters for approval in June 2014, and was passed with 61.8% of the vote.

In 2018, the legislature enacted SB 1421, which went into effect on January 1, 2019. The law provides that public records are not confidential if they pertain to an incident in which police discharged a firearm at a person, an incident in which police use of force resulted in death or great bodily injury, an incident in which police committed sexual assault against a member of the public, or sustained findings of police dishonesty. SB 1421 also sets relatively short timelines for withholding such records during a criminal investigation or criminal enforcement proceeding.

In 2021, Assemblymember Chau proposed a bill, AB 473 (Chau), to carry out the recommended recodification. Alongside, he presented a companion bill, AB 474 (Chau), to bring about the associated revisions. Both these bills were successfully passed, as seen in 2021 Cal. Stat. chs. 614, 615. However, a few of the associated revisions were invalidated by substantive bills that impacted the same code sections. These cancelled revisions have been reintroduced in the Legislature, evident in SB 1380 (Committee on Judiciary).

On January 1, 2023, the California Public Records Act was officially recodified from §6250-§6270.5 to §7920-§7931 of the government code as part of the newly added Division 10 of Title 1: Access to Public Records.

== See also ==
- Bagley-Keene Open Meeting Act – State legislation in California, US
- Brown Act – California state law
- Californians Aware
- County of Santa Clara v. California First Amendment Coalition – Public records-related court case (2009)
- Copyright status of works by subnational governments of the United States: California
