= Microdecisions, Inc. v. Skinner =

Court case on government copyright

- Court: Florida Second District Court of Appeal
- Decided: December 1, 2004
- Docket nos.: 2D03-3346
- Citation: 889 So.2d 871 (Fla. 2d DCA 2004)

Court membership
- Judge sitting: Stevan T. Northcutt

Area of law
- Copyright law

Microdecisions, Inc. v. Skinner, 889 So.2d 871 (Fla. 2d Dist. App. 2004), was a case before the Florida Second District Court of Appeal concerning the copyright status of public records created by agencies and municipalities of the state of Florida.

The case reviewed whether Abe Skinner, the Collier County Property Appraiser, could require prospective commercial users of the official geographic information system records created in his office to first enter into a licensing agreement. The court concluded that he may not. While no one disputed the GIS maps were public record, Skinner argued they were protected by federal copyright law. In the decision, the court held that "Skinner has no authority to assert copyright protection in the GIS maps, which are public records." In support of this, the court held that the "Florida public records law ... overrides a governmental agency's ability to claim a copyright in its work unless the legislature has expressly authorized a public records exemption." Additionally, the court confirmed "Florida's Constitution and its statutes do not permit public records to be copyrighted unless the legislature specifically states they can be."

This was a Florida District Court of Appeal decision, but the Florida Supreme Court declined to hear the case and ordered Skinner (as Collier County Property Appraiser) to pay Microdecisions' attorney's fees. The United States Supreme Court affirmed the lower Court's ruling when it refused to hear the case by denying certiorari review.

The case was cited as providing the main reasoning for the decision in County of Santa Clara v. California First Amendment Coalition by the 4th District of the California Courts of Appeal.

== See also ==
- Copyright status of work by the Florida government
- Copyright status of work by U.S. subnational governments
- County of Suffolk v. First American Real Estate Solutions, 261 F.3d 179 (2001),
