= Cindy Ossias =

American lawyer

Cindy Ossias is an American lawyer. In the early months of the year 2000, while serving as a long-time senior lawyer for the California Department of Insurance (CDI), Ossias leaked confidential documents exposing the allegedly illegal and corrupt activities of Chuck Quackenbush, then Insurance Commissioner of California and head of CDI, to the state legislative consultant investigating the Commissioner's actions. In 2004, Ossias also took a seat as Director for California government watchdog group Californians Aware.

== Education and early career ==
In 1983, Ossias graduated from Golden Gate University School of Law. She practiced criminal defense and family law in San Francisco as a sole practitioner before entering public service as a staff attorney in 1986 at the Workers' Compensation Appeals Board.

Ossias joined the CDI in January 1990. In 1991, she was appointed by then-Insurance Commissioner John Garamendi to a special task force that wrote the state's regulations governing unfair claims practices by insurance companies. During her tenure at the agency, Ossias served as project manager and lead counsel for CDI's activities following various natural catastrophes, including the Oakland firestorm of 1991, the Southern California wildfires of 1993, and the Northridge earthquake of 1994.

She also acted as lead counsel and project manager in disciplinary cases against large insurance companies such as Allstate Insurance, State Farm Insurance, Mercury Insurance Group, UnumProvident Insurance Group (now Unum), and HealthMarkets, Inc. (an insurance holding company).

== Insurance industry corruption whistleblower ==
In early 2000, Ossias photocopied confidential CDI documents, supplied them to the California State Assembly Insurance oversight committee, and disclosed that fact to the California Highway Patrol. In testimony before the State Assembly committee (which provided her with complete immunity from criminal prosecution), Ossias detailed how CDI's upper management had suppressed findings of insurer wrongdoing after the Northridge earthquake of 1994 and instructed her to shred documents.

The reports detailed claims-handling violations by State Farm, Allstate, and 20th Century Insurance, used by Quackenbush to reach settlements with those insurers requiring them to contribute millions of dollars to foundations created by the commissioner.

In return, Quackenbush agreed not to fine the companies or to finalize the reports, allowing the firms to donate $12.8 million to private foundations he had created, in lieu of fines of up to $3 billion – the amount recommended by staff based on the egregious findings contained in the confidential documents Ossias felt compelled to disclose to the legislative oversight committee, in fact the very reports that upper CDI management had suppressed.

According to testimony by CDI employees, including Ossias, and Assistant Chief Counsel Robert Hagedorn, the commissioner and his top aides abused their positions for personal gain and acted against consumers’ interests for many years.

== Aftermath ==
Quackenbush resigned from office shortly after Ossias testified before the Legislature. He was never charged, although his Deputy Commissioner was charged with and pleaded guilty to having accepted kickbacks from contributions made from the insurance foundations set up by Quackenbush. Two others were indicted in the same scheme.

In the wake of Ossias' whistleblowing, a measure was passed (AB 363) permitting lawyers representing governmental clients at any level to report crimes and fraud to law enforcement or to government oversight bodies "in order to prevent or rectify substantial harm to the public." That bill was vetoed by Democratic Gov. Gray Davis. A subsequent similar measure passed and was vetoed by Republican Gov. Arnold Schwarzenegger, who became Governor after Davis was recalled.

== Subsequent career ==
Following the Quackenbush events and the term of the acting commissioner (during which period Ossias was assigned only minor cases, thereby appeasing insurers allegedly lobbying for her termination), John Garamendi was reelected Insurance Commissioner. Under Garamendi, Ossias served as lead counsel/project manager in CDI's case involving the claims and business practices of the nation's largest disability income insurance holding company, UnumProvident Corp. The investigation concluded with a settlement with UnumProvident, in which the company paid an $8 million fine, agreed to make substantial changes to their disability income insurance policies sold in California to make them more favorable to their insureds, and agreed to reassess claims that had been denied or terminated between 1997 and 2005. The company also agreed to provide an independent third party review to those claimants not satisfied with the company's reassessment.

Some sources indicated that Ossias considered running for Insurance Commissioner in 2006 as a Democrat. However, she did not run, and Lieutenant Governor Cruz Bustamante defeated Kraft Foods heir John Kraft for the Democratic nomination. Bustamante, in turn, lost to Republican businessman Steve Poizner.
