= Brown Act =

California state law

California State Legislature
- Full name: An act to add Chapter 9, comprising Sections 54950 to 54958, inclusive, to Part 1, Division 2, Title 5, of the Government Code, relating to meetings of legislative bodies of local agencies.
- Signed into law: July 2, 1953
- Sponsor: Ralph M. Brown
- Governor: Earl Warren
- Code: California Government Code
- Bill: AB 339

Status: Current legislation

The Ralph M. Brown Act is a California law that guarantees the public's right to attend and participate in meetings of local legislative bodies. Located at California Government Code 54950 et seq., it is an act of the California State Legislature, authored by Assemblymember Ralph M. Brown and passed in 1953.

The Brown Act was enacted in response to mounting public concerns over informal, undisclosed meetings held by local elected officials. City councils, county boards, and other local government bodies were avoiding public scrutiny by holding secret "workshops" and "study sessions." The Brown Act applies to “local agencies,” meaning a county, city, whether general law or chartered, city and county, town, school district, municipal corporation, district, political subdivision, or any board, commission or agency thereof, or other local public agency. The Act has been interpreted to apply to email communication as well, leading to restrictions on the number of parties that can be copied on electronic messages. The comparable Bagley-Keene Act mandates open meetings for State government agencies.

== History ==
In 1952, the San Francisco Chronicle published a 10-part article series titled “Your Secret Government”, where reporter Mike Harris revealed that local agencies were frequently holding secret meetings or caucuses, even though state law had long required that business should be done in public. Harris went on to draft a new state open meeting law together with Richard (Bud) Carpenter, legal counsel for the League of California Cities, and Assembly Member Ralph M. Brown agreed to carry the bill, which was signed into law by Governor Earl Warren in 1953. Notably, increased public notice requirements also increased local agency classified advertising spending. Public meeting notice spending was preferential for morning newspapers such as the Chronicle, which was in a bitter rivalry with the late William Randolph Hearst's San Francisco Examiner, an evening newspaper.

The introduction to the Brown Act describes its purpose and intent:

In enacting this chapter, the Legislature finds and declares that the public commissions, boards and councils and the other public agencies in this State exist to aid in the conduct of the people's business. It is the intent of the law that their actions be taken openly and that their deliberations be conducted openly. The people of this State do not yield their sovereignty to the agencies which serve them. The people, in delegating authority, do not give their public servants the right to decide what is good for the people to know and what is not good for them to know. The people insist on remaining informed so that they may retain control over the instruments they have created.

The Sacramento Bee said of the act in 1952:

A law to prohibit secret meetings of official bodies, save under the most exceptional circumstances, should not be necessary. Public officers above all other persons should be imbued with the truth that their business is the public's business and they should be the last to tolerate any attempt to keep the people from being fully informed as to what is going on in official agencies. Unfortunately, however, that is not always the case. Instances are many in which officials have contrived, deliberately and shamefully, to operate in a vacuum of secrecy.

== Criticisms ==
Supporters of the Brown Act say it still lacks enforcement (and has never had a successful prosecution), contending the law has been eroded by court decisions and government officials' efforts to block access to records. "The unfulfilled promise, I'm afraid, that 50 years has revealed, is enforcement," commented Terry Francke, of the California First Amendment Coalition, on the 50th anniversary of the bill's passage in 2003.

== Brown Act sections ==
- Title and definitions
- Adjourned or continued meetings
- Closed sessions
- Documents at meetings are public
- Emergency situations
- Electronic communications
- Public is not required to provide their name or any information
- No action or discussion shall be undertaken on any item not on the agenda
- Notice of meetings
- Open meetings
- Penalty to deprive the public of information
- Public comment
- Public criticism allowed
- Right to recording proceedings
- Reports of closed session actions
- Special meetings
- Taxes
- Time limits for public testimony
- When it does apply
- When it does not apply
- Willfully interrupting a meeting

== See also ==
- Freedom of information law in California
- Bagley-Keene Act
- California Public Records Act
- Sunshine law
- Freedom of Information Act
- Transparency (humanities) (metaphorical term, also related to politics)
- Conflict of interest
- Californians Aware
