= Kendrick Sampson =

American actor and activist (born 1988)

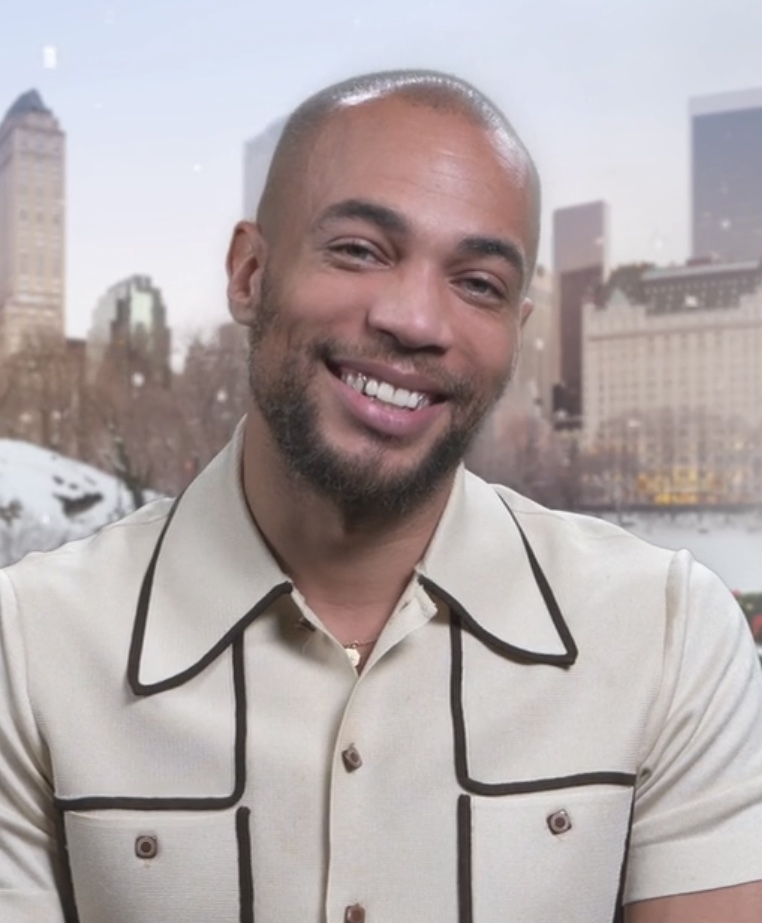
- Sampson in 2022
- Born: March 8, 1988 (age 38); Houston, Texas, U.S.
- Occupations: Actor, Activist
- Years active: 2005–present

Kendrick Sampson (born March 8, 1988) is an American actor and activist, best known for his appearances on The Vampire Diaries, Gracepoint, How to Get Away with Murder, The Flash, and HBO's Insecure.

== Early life ==
Sampson was born and raised in Houston, Texas, the son of Daphne Smith Sampson and Hoyle Sampson Sr. As a child, Sampson was enrolled in music lessons. Sampson expressed an interest in acting at 10 after he saw a Gap commercial. After finding an agent, Sampson was referred to the Kim Terry Studio in Texas. He began performing in theater productions while attending Elkins High School. Sampson is a devout Christian.

== Career ==
In 2008, Sampson appeared in two episodes of the ABC Family series Greek and followed that up with an episode of CSI: Crime Scene Investigation in 2010. In July 2013, Sampson booked the recurring role of Jesse in the fifth season of The CW series The Vampire Diaries. In January 2014, Sampson was cast in the role of Dean Iverson in the Fox miniseries Gracepoint. In November 2014, Sampson starred in the music video for Hayley Kiyoko's song "This Side of Paradise." In early 2015, Sampson shot the pilot for a potential ABC series called The Kingmakers but the series wasn't picked up. In July 2015, Sampson booked the recurring role of Caleb Hapstall in the second season of ABC's prime time legal drama How to Get Away with Murder, produced by Shonda Rhimes. From 2018–2021, Sampson had a recurring role as Nathan Campbell on Issa Rae's Insecure. Sampson has also started his own production company called Sampson Studios.

=== Activism ===
In May 2019, Sampson founded the organization BLD PWR for new development, empowerment and change within marginalized groups and American society. Following the murder of George Floyd, Sampson actively participated in and organized Black Lives Matter protests in Los Angeles. During the protests, Sampson reported that police officers shot rubber bullets at him and assaulted him. Sampson called for a one-day strike in Hollywood over the shooting of Jacob Blake.

In 2020, Sampson collaborated with JusticeLA to create a public service announcement #SuingToSaveLives about the health of people in Los Angeles County Jails amid the COVID-19 pandemic.

== Filmography ==
=== Film ===
Year	Title	Role	Notes
2005	Resurrection: The J.R. Richard Story	Lamar	
2011	This Boy's Dream	Announcer	Short film
2011	Immune	Darren	Short film; Producer and writer
2012	The Sidelines	Fred Billings	Short film
2014	Survival		Short film; Assistant producer
2016	Rougarou	Henri	Short film
2020	Miss Juneteenth	Ronnie	
2022	Something from Tiffany's	Ethan Greene	
2026	Michael	Quincy Jones	Debut film
2026	Killing Castro	Malcolm X	

=== Television ===
Year	Title	Role	Notes
2008	Greek	Woodchuck	2 episodes
2010	CSI: Crime Scene Investigation	Derrick Gold	Episode: "Field Mice"
2011	Days of Our Lives	Jay Jordan	Episode: December 8, 2011
2013	The Vampire Diaries	Jesse	Recurring role; 5 episodes
2014	Gracepoint	Dean Iverson	Miniseries
2014	2014 Young Hollywood Awards	Himself	TV special
2015	Kingmakers	Pete Greer	TV movie
2015	VH1 Big in 2015 with Entertainment Weekly	Himself	TV special
2015–2016	How to Get Away with Murder	Caleb Hapstall	Recurring role; 13 episodes
2016	Hollywood Today Live	Himself	Episode: 16 March 2016
2016–2017	Supernatural	Max Banes	2 episodes
2017	Up To Us	Himself	Documentary
2017	Rosewood	Nathan Turner	Episode: "Asphyxiation & Aces"
2017	White Famous	Robbie MacDonald	Recurring; 4 episodes
2017	Relationship Status	Nate	4 episodes
2017	The Flash	Dominic Lanse / Brainstorm, Clifford DeVoe / Thinker	Recurring role (3 episodes)
2018–2021	Insecure	Nathan Campbell	Recurring (season 3); main cast (seasons 4–5)
2019	Ghosting: The Spirit of Christmas	Ben	TV movie
2020	Fashionably Yours	Rob	TV movie
2023	I'm a Virgo	Edwin Garrison	Episode: "It Requires Trust on My Part"
