= Californians Aware =

Californians Aware, The Center for Public Forum Rights, also known as CalAware, is a Carmichael, California based nonprofit organization established to help journalists and others keep Californians aware of what they need to know to hold government and other powerful institutions accountable for their actions. Its mission, firmly rooted in supporting the protections guaranteed by the First Amendment of the United States Constitution, is to support and defend open government, an enquiring press and a citizenry free to exchange facts and opinions on public issues.

Californians Aware was founded by Terry Francke, former executive director and general counsel of the California First Amendment Coalition. J.W. August is the current president, and board members include Richard McKee, CalAware President Emeritus, Cindy Ossias, the whistleblower known for exposing California Department of Insurance corruption, and Donna Frye, who narrowly missed election in 2004 as mayor of San Diego, running as a write-in candidate.

CalAware's site features database-driven content, a database-driven e-Newsletter, ecommerce fundraising, members-only area, and more. Its latest service is SunScribe, a public records request letter generator that offers supplementary fee-based options such as having CalAware send the letter in its name (preserving the requester's anonymity) and having CalAware's general counsel evaluate the legal validity of any agency response denying access.

== See also ==
- Brown Act
