= S.T.A.R. Corps =

Fictional organization created by DC Comics

- Cover of S.T.A.R. Corps #6, artist Norman Felchle.

Publication information
- Publisher: DC Comics
- First appearance: S.T.A.R. Corps #1 (November 1993)
- Created by: Dan Vado (writer); Norman Felchle (artist)

In-story information
- Type of business: Security guards
- Owner(s): S.T.A.R. Labs
- Employee(s): Brainstorm; Deadzone; Fusion; Ndoki; Trauma

S.T.A.R. Corps is a fictional organization, a team of comic book superheroes published by DC Comics. The S.T.A.R. Corps first appeared in S.T.A.R. Corps #1 (November 1993), and was created by Dan Vado and Norman Felchle.

== History ==
=== Issue #1 ===
==== S.T.A.R. Labs, Metropolis ====
Former U.S. Navy Seal Jay Daniels is contracted by S.T.A.R. Labs as the test pilot for a powered armor codenamed "Deadzone", which they developed for the United States Navy. During the press conference where the Deadzone armor was to be revealed, it malfunctions and is fused to Daniels' nervous system. This is the first of a series of engineered accidents triggered by Mindgame, an artificial intelligence created by S.T.A.R. Labs.

Superman subdues Daniels, who is stabilized by Kitty Faulkner. After the pain from the fusion subsides, Daniels is asked to investigate a radiation leak deliberately caused by Mindgame at the radiation labs located in building 9, and to evacuate Ed and Beth Wilder, the two researchers trapped there. By the time Daniels arrives, the building's reactor has already exploded, transforming the Wilders into metahumans and combining them into an energy being dubbed "Fusion".

=== Issue #2 ===
Mindgame takes over a S.T.A.R. Labs robotics facility in Wichita, Kansas and uses it to create cadres of flying robotic soldiers, which it names the "Gamesmen". In Metropolis, the Wilders figure out how to split and fuse at will, and Doctor Mardis learns that Mindgame has decided that the Metropolis personnel are an impediment to its goals. Two hours later, the Gamesman units arrive in Metropolis with orders to slaughter all human personnel except the metahuman test subjects. Daniels, Faulkner, and the Wilders manage to fight the Gamesmen off and force a tactical retreat.

=== Issue #3 ===
At S.T.A.R. Labs in Seattle, paid research volunteer Alan Barnes undergoes a trial to trigger latent extrasensory perception through the use of cybernetic implants. A process similar to technology is later perfected by criminal researcher Cliff Carmicheal. The procedure renders Barnes catatonic, but leaves his mind active, which slowly drives him insane. Mindgame contacts Barnes and brings him out of his stupor. The implants grant Barnes telepathy, technopathy, and the ability to generate psionic blasts.

In Metropolis, Mardis reveals the truth about Mindgame to facility director David Ramsey: the hardware that led to Mindgame's development was salvaged from a crashed alien ship discovered by the government of Australia. Meanwhile, at S.T.A.R. Labs in San Jose, California, Cameroon exchange student Charles Ndoki is trapped inside a linear particle accelerator and apparently disintegrated.

=== Issue #4 ===
==== S.T.A.R. Labs, San Jose ====
In actuality, the accelerator triggered Ndoki's metagene, transforming him into an energy being with the ability to destabilize or animate any matter he touches and manipulate energy by transforming into a stable waveform. Ramsey requests that Ndoki be driven to the San Francisco location, a metahuman testing facility. Mardis discovers that Mindgame has generated a computer virus and infected the entire S.T.A.R. network. Mardis plans to scrub the virus from the network, but states that the Gamesman robots all carry parts of the Mindgame code and will need to be disabled as well. While driving to San Francisco, Ndoki and a fellow employee are attacked by Gamesman units, forcing Ndoki to defend himself.

=== Issue #5 ===
Amy Southern is the lone research volunteer in "Project Trauma" in San Francisco. Due to Mindgame's interference, Southern's metagene is triggered by an adrenaline overdose, giving her superhuman strength and durability. Southern goes on a pain-blinded rampage due to adrenaline toxicity, causing her to require constant sedation to stay calm. Southern joins the other S.T.A.R. Corps test subjects as they come together to fight off another attempt by the Gamesmen to capture them.

=== Issue #6 ===
The entire team is assembled in San Francisco, with Kitty Faulkner serving as their corporate liaison. Mindgame reverts to its original program directive of preparing Earth for colonization, which would require the immediate extinction of humanity. The Gamesman units join to form a collective colossus, which refers to itself as Mindgame. The S.T.A.R. Corps are deployed and all take codenames except for Ndoki, who decides to be known mononymously by his surname. Mardis creates special modules to attach to the Gamesman units to disable them. The team attaches their modules to the Mindgame construct's legs, allowing Mardis and Ramsey to trap it inside a specially prepared mainframe.

== Membership ==
- Brainstorm (Alan Barnes) - A research volunteer with artificially generated psionic abilities created by S.T.A.R. Labs. He uncovers the true nature of the Mindgame computer and the Gamesman units.
- Deadzone (Jay Daniels) - A former Navy Seal who was fused with a suit of high tech combat armor.
- Fusion (Ed Wilder and Beth Wilder) - A married pair of scientists who hate each other. They were fused together in a process similar to the one that created Firestorm.
- Ndoki (Charles Ndoki) - A metahuman exchange student from Cameroon who can transform his body into living energy.
- Trauma (Amy Southern) - A woman with superhuman strength that rivals Rampage which she can barely control due to her elevated adrenaline levels. She requires constant sedation.
