= County of Santa Clara v. California First Amendment Coalition =

Public records-related court case (2009)

- Court: California Court of Appeal, Sixth District
- Full case name: County of Santa Clara, et al. v. The Superior Court of Santa Clara County, California First Amendment Coalition
- Citations: 170 Cal. App. 4th 1301; 89 Cal. Rptr. 3d 374

Case history
- Appealed from: Santa Clara County Superior Court

Court membership
- Judges sitting: Richard J. McAdams, Franklin D. Elia, Nathan D. Mihara

Case opinions
- Decision by: McAdams

Laws applied
- California Public Records Act

County of Santa Clara v. California First Amendment Coalition, 170 Cal. App. 4th 1301 (2009), was a case before the California Courts of Appeal dealing with the ability of a local California agency to limit the disclosure of, or require license agreements for, public records and data requested under the California Public Records Act (CPRA).

The court found that as public records, there was "no statutory basis either for copyrighting the GIS basemap or for conditioning its release on a licensing agreement" under United States copyright law because state freedom of information laws preclude a state agency’s reliance on federal copyright unless state law specifically permits it.

== History ==
The case dealt with a public records request by the California First Amendment Coalition for GIS "basemap" data held by Santa Clara County, California. The trial court concluded that the county must release the records and could not place any restrictions on their use. The county then appealed to the California Courts of Appeal, which upheld the lower court's decision, and published its opinion. The county also unsuccessfully attempted to have the opinion depublished by the Supreme Court of California.

The county made three arguments. The county claimed the records were "protected critical infrastructure information" and exempted from release by the federal Critical Infrastructure Information Act of 2002, that disclosure was exempted under the CPRA under the "catch all" exemption, and that it had a federal copyright in the basemap, arguing that copyright protection authorized the county to condition release of records, under freedom of information laws like the CPRA, with restrictions on the requester’s use of the records or sharing of the records with others.

== Decision ==
The court rejected each of the county's arguments:

- The court rejected that the records were exempted from release as "protected critical infrastructure information" under the Critical Infrastructure Information Act, as the county was only the provider of such resources, not the receiver, and hence the CII was irrelevant.
- The court rejected the CPRA "catch all" exemption claim, concluding that the "public interest in disclosure outweighs the public interest in nondisclosure.”
- The court stated that as "a matter of first impression in California" there is "no statutory basis either for copyrighting the GIS basemap or for conditioning its release on a licensing agreement" and order that the "record thus must be disclosed as provided in the CPRA, without any such conditions or limitations" and ruled that it considered the general case of "interplay between copyright law and California's public records law, with the result that unrestricted disclosure is required".

== See also ==
- Microdecisions, Inc. v. Skinner (2004)
- County of Suffolk v. First American Real Estate Solutions, 261 F.3d 179 (2001)
- Sierra Club v. County of Orange, 57 Cal.4th 157 (2013)
