= First Amendment Coalition =

American nonprofit public interest organization

The First Amendment Coalition (FAC) is a nonprofit public interest organization committed to freedom of speech, more open and accountable government, and public participation in civic affairs. Founded in 1988, FAC's activities include "test case" litigation, free legal consultations on First Amendment issues, educational programs, legislative oversight of bills in California affecting access to government and free speech, and public advocacy. In 2016, lawyer and journalist David Snyder became the organization's executive director.

== History ==
FAC co-authored and sponsored Proposition 59 , the Sunshine Amendment to the California State Constitution, enacted by voters in 2004. FAC since then has enforced Prop. 59, suing Governor Arnold Schwarzenegger to force him to make public his and his staff's calendars of appointments, pressuring state agencies to be more transparent in their decision-making, and filing lawsuits to strengthen existing protections and establish new rights of access.

Recent suits have involved public access to government databases; greater disclosure by CalPERS (the state pension system) of its investments in hedge funds, the release of Department of Justice memos analyzing drone strikes to kill American citizens abroad, private equity deals and other alternative investments; extending government access requirements to the California court system; and curbing agency use of the most abused FOI exemptions.

FAC's "Legal Hotline" provides legal information and assistance to journalists, bloggers, ethnic media, and ordinary citizens. FAC's web site is a key resource for statutes, cases, "FAQs," news and analysis on First Amendment and freedom of information issues in California. Many portions are available in Spanish and Mandarin for use by ethnic media.

FAC holds regular events across California to discuss free speech issues and has hosted annual conferences with its partners the USC Annenberg School for Communication and Journalism and the University of California, Berkeley Graduate School of Journalism. Past speakers have included Jeffrey Toobin, Stuart Taylor, Jr., Arianna Huffington, Daniel Ellsberg, NSA General Counsel Robert Deitz, former NY Times reporter Judith Miller, First Amendment lawyer Floyd Abrams, investigative reporter Seymour Hersh, Commentary Magazine editor Gabriel Schoenfeld, Internet journalism pioneer Dan Gillmor, and leading media lawyers from around the country. FAC has also published "The Right to Know: A Guide to Public Access and Media Law," (2007), a comprehensive handbook on FOI, First Amendment and news-gathering law.

FAC's members are news organizations, law firms, libraries, civic organizations, academics, freelance journalists, bloggers, community activists, and ordinary citizens. Members and supporters are kept abreast of legal issues through FAC's newsletter—a combination of original commentaries and summaries of news and legal developments. FAC's views reach a larger audience through republication of its commentaries in newspapers across the state, as well as television and radio appearances by its executive director.

FAC is nonpartisan and politically non-ideological. Membership spans the political spectrum, from liberals who worry about excessive government secrecy to conservatives who see big government as a threat to individual liberties. All support freedom from censorship, whether from the left or the right, and government transparency.

The Coalition receives significant institutional support from the Jonathan Logan Family Foundation, the Craig Newmark Philanthropic Foundation, Will Hearst, and the Central Valley Foundation in California. FAC and Peter Scheer, its former executive director, were acknowledged both regionally and nationally through receipt of the Eugene S. Pulliam First Amendment Award. and the James Madison Freedom of Information Award in 2006.

FAC's board of directors is led by Duffy Carolan, partner at Jassy Vick Carolan LLP. Members consist of representatives of "old" media (e.g., Carol Melamed, former vice-president of Government Affairs at the Washington Post (retired), Martin Reynolds, co-founder of Oakland Voices, which trains residents to serve as community correspondents, and Hal Fuson, Attorney, Former Executive Vice President, The Copley Press, Inc.), "new" media (e.g., Richard Gingras, Sr Director of News & Social Products, Google and Dan Gillmor, Knight Center, Cronkite School of Journalism, University of Arizona, Phoenix), representatives of public interest organizations (e.g., Nate Cardozo, Senior Staff Attorney at the Electronic Frontier Foundation), as well as academics and First Amendment lawyers.

== See also ==
- County of Santa Clara v. California First Amendment Coalition
