= Denver Police Department =

Law enforcement agency in Denver, Colorado

- Chest patch (No shoulder patches are worn.)

- Badge of Denver Police Department
- Abbreviation: DPD

Agency overview
- Employees: 1,824 (2020)
- Annual budget: $229 million (2021)

Jurisdictional structure
- Operations jurisdiction: Denver, Colorado, United States
- Map of Denver Police Department's jurisdiction
- Area: 154.9 square miles (401 km^{2})
- Population: 716,492 (2018) within the city & county of Denver. 2,552,195 in the metro area.
- General nature: Local civilian police

Operational structure
- Police officers: Administrative = 110 (2025); Airport Operations = 132 (2025); Investigative = 344 (2025); Patrol = 1,053 (2025); Total = 1,639 (2025)
- Civilian employees: 307
- Agency executives: Ron Thomas, Chief of Police; Deputy Chief Joseph Montoya Jr., Deputy Chief of Police; Division Chief Aaron Sanchez, Division Chief of Patrol; Division Chief Charles Kyle, Division Chief of Investigations; Division Chief Magen Dodge, Division Chief of Administration
- Parent agency: Denver Department of Public Safety

Facilities
- Districts: 6
- Patrol cars: Ford Crown Victoria, Ford Expedition, Chevrolet Impala, GMC Yukon/Chevrolet Tahoe, Dodge Durango, Awaiting Ford Utility Interceptor and Pursuit Interceptor to replace aging Crown Victoria
- Air units: 1 - 1998 Bell 407
- K-9 Units: Belgian Malinois and Dutch Shepherd

Website
- https://denvergov.org/content/denvergov/en/police-department.html

The Denver Police Department (DPD) is the full service police department jointly for the City and County of Denver, Colorado, which provides police services to the entire county, including Denver International Airport, and may provide contractual security police service to special districts within the county. The police department is within the Denver Department of Public Safety, which also includes the Denver Sheriff Department and Denver Fire Department. The DPD was established in 1859. The current police chief is Ron Thomas.

== Specialized units ==
The Special Weapons And Tactics (SWAT) team deals with hostage negotiation, drug busts and counter-terrorism. METRO SWAT operates 2 LENCO Bear Cats and a new Freightliner Command Post.

There is also an air support unit.

=== HALO program ===
The High Activity Location Observation (HALO) Program is a collaborative effort between Denver Police, community groups and local businesses. Established in 2006, the program utilizes networked video cameras through surveillance to deter crime and enhance public safety through faster response to incidents. Monitored locations include high-traffic intersections, areas where drug activity and street crime are prevalent, and public facilities and parks. Cameras are also used to protect tourist sites, healthcare facilities and areas with homeland security importance. Mobile cameras are used to help manage crime hotspots. Police point to successes, including HALO's help in controlling major drug and street crime issues on notorious East Colfax Avenue.

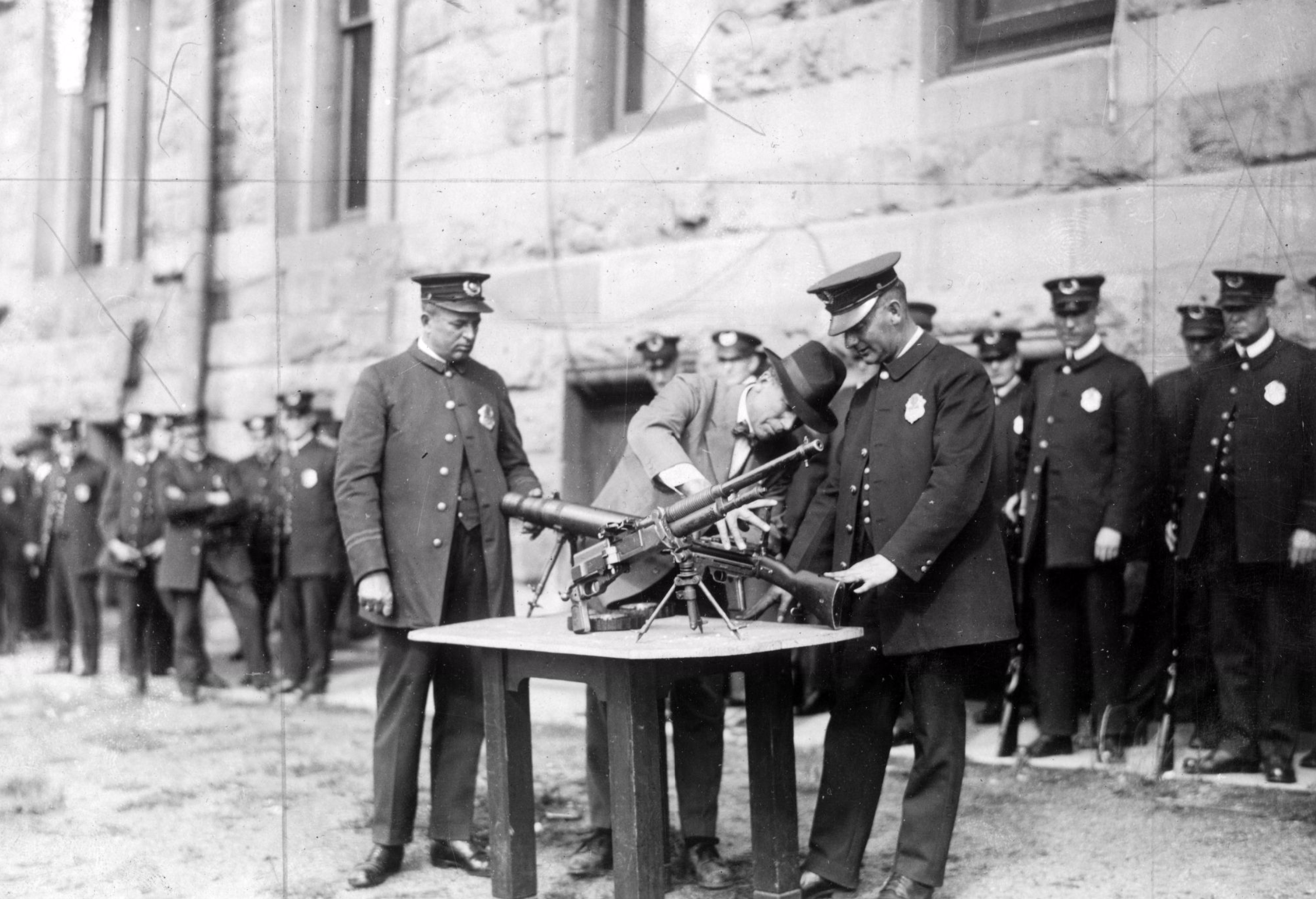
Expert demonstrating machine guns to Denver Police Department officers, 1921

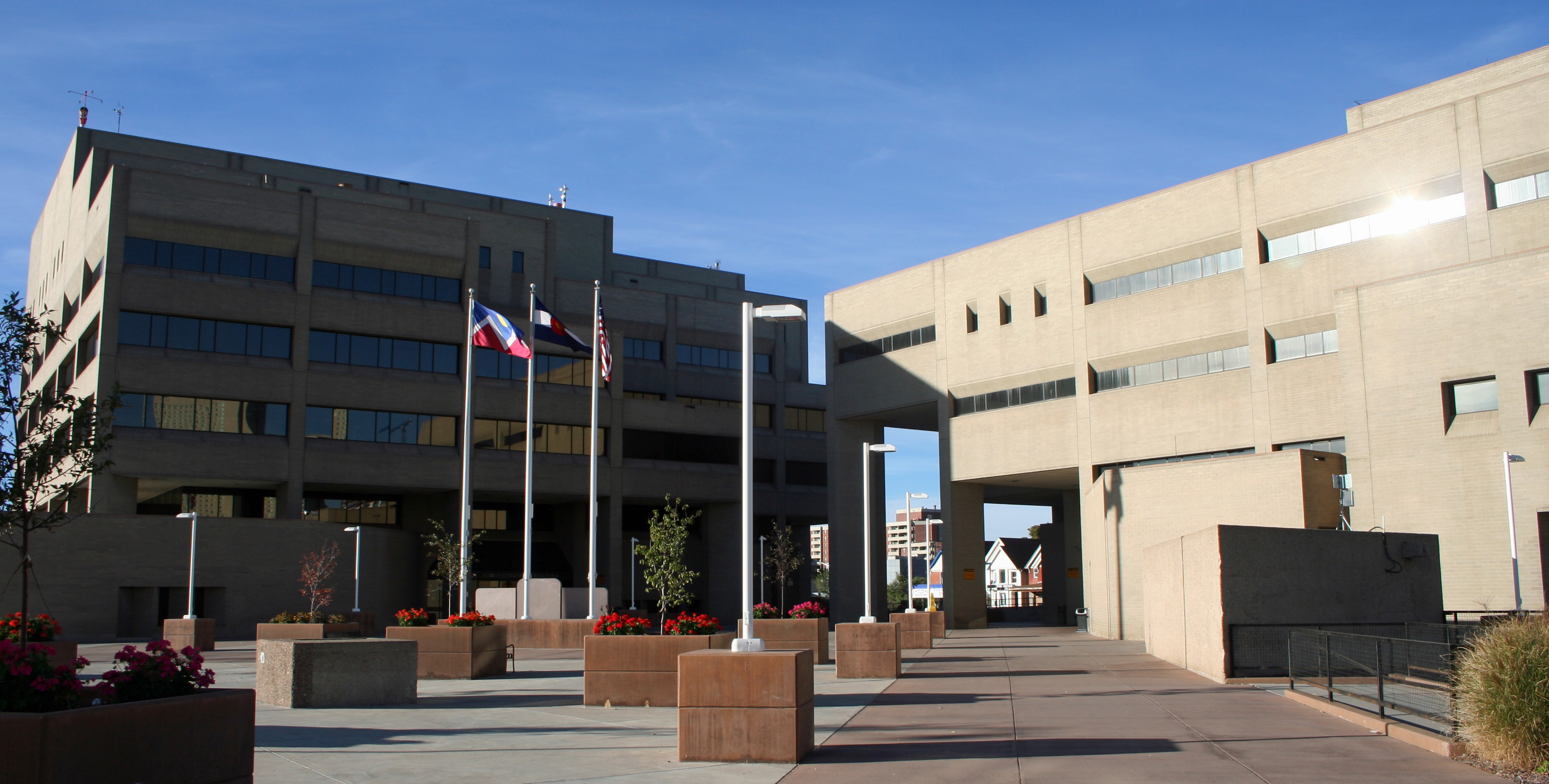
The Denver Police administration building (left) in downtown Denver. The building on the right is the former pretrial detention facility.

== Rank Structure and Insignia ==
The Patrol Division is made up of 6 patrol districts. Within each patrol district, there are up to 3 different sectors. Each sector is made up of numerous precincts. Each precinct has one patrol car with 1–2 officers assigned it. Officers assigned to patrol work four 10-hour shifts.

Recruits begin the DPD Academy as a recruit officer. Upon graduation, officers are classified as "police officer 4th class." After the completion of 3 years of service, officers are classified as "police officer 1st class."

Title	Description	Insignia
Chief of Police	The Chief of Police is the overall person in charge of leading the department.	
Deputy Chief	Appointed by the Chief of Police from Division Chief, Commander and Captain ranks.	
Division Chief	Appointed by the Chief of Police from Commander, Captain and Lieutenant ranks.	
Commander	Appointed by the Chief of Police from Lieutenant and Captain ranks.	
Captain	Promotion based on panel interview/departmental assessment. Current rank is no longer used it now goes from Lieutenant to Commander.	
Lieutenant	Promotion based on a written examination and panel interview/departmental assessment.	
Sergeant	Promotion based on a written examination and panel interview/departmental assessment.	
Corporal	At least one year service as a technician before eligibility for promotion to corporal (after an additional written examination and interview).	
Technician	At least three years service as a police officer before eligibility for promotion to Technician (after an additional written examination and interview).	
Police Officer	4th–1st Class	

== Demographics ==
Breakdown of the makeup of the rank and file of DPD as of the 2007 annual report:

- Male: 89%
- Female: 11%
- White: 68%
- Hispanic: 20%
- African American/Black: 9%
- Asian: 2%
- Native American: 1%

== Controversies and criticisms ==
Denver Police have met with controversy and protest over several high-profile incidents that have led them to include citizens in their Disciplinary Review Board and Use of Force Review Board. During this period, 86 people were shot by Denver police officers, resulting in 40 deaths. In most of the 86 shootings, “the individual was clearly pointing a gun at officers.” A 2015 review of past court cases observed that Denver juries almost always acquit police officers charged with excessive force. “They realize police have to make split-second decisions to protect their own safety, and can make an honest mistake. If an officer’s version is even remotely plausible, he'll probably get the benefit of the doubt.”

During the 1920s, a number of DPD officers were members of the Ku Klux Klan in Denver. William J. Candlish, who was police chief of the DPD from 1924 to 1925 was a Grand Dragon in the KKK. Ledgers of KKK members show that at least 53 Denver police officers were members of the KKK in the 1920s.

=== 1953 ===
In 1953 the Denver Police Department began to gather information on individuals and groups regarding activities that might pose a threat to public safety. The files came to be known as the Spy Files during the publicity surrounding an American Civil Liberties Union class action lawsuit in 2002. According to the lawsuit, as many as 3,200 individuals and 208 organizations had been targeted for intelligence gathering operations. These groups and individuals included not only criminal elements but also peace activists and education and human rights organizations. The lawsuit was settled in 2003 with the city revising its policies governing the gathering of this type of information. Mayor John Hickenlooper ordered the records be archived at the Denver Public Library and preserved for study. Part of the archive is currently available to the public and part is a restricted collection, accessible only by those individuals and organizations specifically named in the documents. The complete collection will open to the public in the year 2055.

=== 1960 ===
In 1960, the largest police corruption scandal in the U.S. to date began to unfold. More than 50 area law-enforcement personnel - almost entirely Denver Police Officers - were caught in a burglary ring. Cops had stolen over a quarter of a million dollars from businesses they were supposed to be protecting on their beats over a ten-year period. Police cars would close down a few blocks of a major business avenue, such as University or Broadway, then burgle and steal the safes from the businesses along the closed down portion of the street. Alarms would be going off all up and down the street, they would take their loot, then respond to the alarms and take the reports. It all came to a crashing halt when an officer named Art Winstanley literally had a safe fall out of the back of his police cruiser. He testified against his fellow officers and by the end of 1961, 47 police officers had lost their badges.

=== 1979 ===
In 2008, a 1979 video that showed Sergeant Arthur Hutchinson addressing a group of police recruits drew attention. He used the terms "niggers", "beaners", "greasers" and "homos" to describe them. He asked one woman in the class "is the real reason you came on here is because you just wanted to have access to 1,400 guys to fuck?" Sergeant Hutchinson went on to serve as the chief of police in Eagle, Colorado, for a year, and then as the chief in Black Hawk, Colorado, from 1996 to 2006.

=== 1999 ===
In September 1999 a Denver Police SWAT team performed a no-knock raid on the home of 45-year-old Mexican national, Ismael Mena, believing there to be drugs in the house. Police said that Mena pulled a gun on officers and opened fire, necessitating deadly force be used. Allegations of a police coverup of the shooting were never substantiated. Information from Mexican authorities indicated that Mena was a suspect in a homicide there. No drugs were found on the premise. Media and critics of the police department's handling of the situation have pointed out inconsistencies in officers' stories. Joseph Bini, the officer who gave the address to the SWAT team, was charged with first-degree official misconduct, and sentenced to 12 months probation. The city of Denver later settled a lawsuit filed by Mena's family for $400,000. It was later determined that police targeted the wrong house having gotten the information from an unreliable informant who claimed to have purchased $20 of crack cocaine on the premises.

=== 2006 ===
In February 2006 Amy Shroff was attacked by her estranged husband as she tried to enter a Denver police station. She showed Officer Frank Spellman the restraining order that protected her from the man. Officer Spellman then arrested Shroff. On 28 June 2010, the Denver City Council agreed to pay $175,000 to settle a civil suit on the matter.

=== 2007 ===
In September 2009, Denver paid $225,000 to the family of Alberto Romero. Romero died after being beaten and repeatedly tasered by city police officers in 2007.

=== 2008 ===
On April 4, 2008, John Heaney was riding his bicycle past the stadium and allegedly ran a red light. He was stopped by Detective Micheal Cordova who was in plainclothes because he was working a sting operation against ticket scalpers. Cordova testified in court under oath that Heaney swung and punched at him several times, forcing Cordova to punch back. Cordova said Heaney “continued to throw wild punches at me, hitting me in the chest area several times forcing me to punch him in the face several times”. When he was asked how Heaney's two front teeth were broken, Cordova responded, “I have not a clue.” John Heaney was charged with assault on a police officer and faced a minimum 3-year sentence, before a video tape surfaced showing it was Detective Cordova who attacked Heaney, tackling him, punching him in the face several times, and finally smashing his teeth into the pavement; the district attorney's office then dropped all charges against Heaney. A jury acquitted Detective Cordova on the assault charges and no charges were filed for perjury. The video was found to be edited prior to airing on the news channel and being given to the court. The video showed only the middle of fight and not the entire event.

On 18 April 2008 16-year-old Juan Vasquez ran from members of the Denver Police Department, an officer shouted for him "to stop or he would shoot him in the back." When Vasquez fell in the alley, one officer jumped on his back. Other officers began to punch and kick him as Vasquez "begged" them to stop. Two of the arresting officers testified that Officer Charles Porter began jumping up and down on the teen's back while he was handcuffed and lying face-down on the ground. Vasquez, who is 5-foot-6 and 130 pounds, was hospitalized with a lacerated liver, a ruptured spleen, damage to both kidneys and bruised or fractured ribs. He spent three days in intensive care handcuffed to the bed. Porter was charged and acquitted of felony assault charges, he was the only witness at his defense and claimed the other officers who testified against him caused the injuries during the arrest and conspired to pin the blame on him. Vasquez filed a lawsuit for 1.3 million dollars, and the city settled for "just under $1,000,000".

In 2008 Officer Eric Sellers and two unnamed Denver police officers attacked Jared Lunn. Lunn had tried to report that he had been assaulted earlier in the evening. In August 2010, Sellers was suspended for 45 days over the incident. The case was later reopened, presenting the possibility of additional punishment.

=== 2009 ===
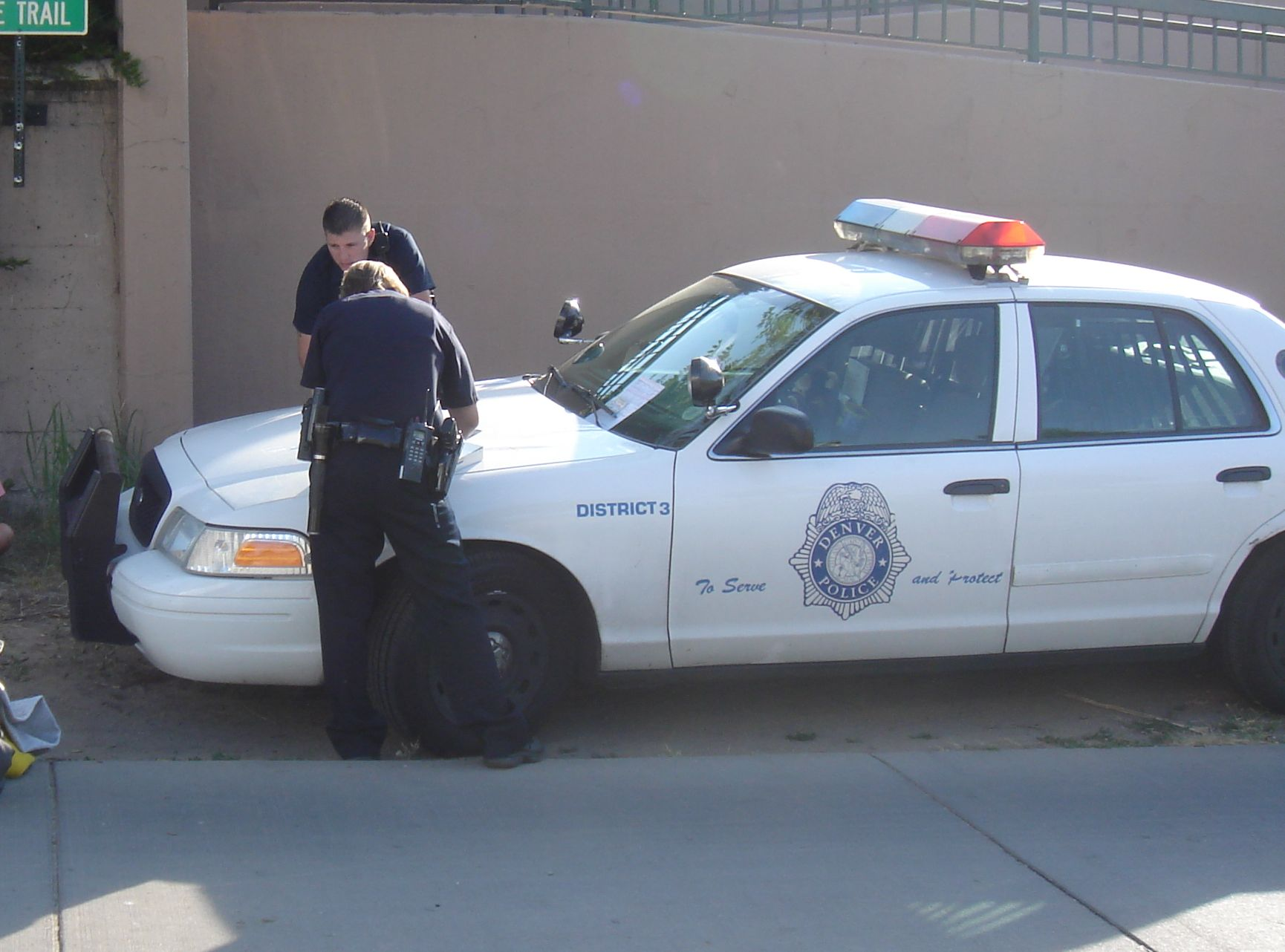
Denver officers and cruiser

In January 2009, Alexander Landau was beaten by three Denver police officers and received a $795,000 settlement in 2011, one of the largest settlements in Denver history to resolve a police brutality case. The police officers involved in the case were Officers Kevin Devine, Ricky Nixon, Tiffany Middleton, and Corporal Randy Murr. Officer Middleton continues to serve with the department. In September 2013, the department fired Officers Nixon and Devine for lying during the investigation. The two were later reinstated by the Denver Civil Service Commission. Officer Nixon was fired again in 2015 during an employment rights battle between Nixon and the City of Denver.

In April 2009, Corporal Murr and Officer Sparks threw Michael DeHerrea to the ground during an arrest outside of a downtown nightclub. The two were fired for lying during the subsequent investigation but returned to their jobs as a result of a hearing by the Denver Civil Service Commission. In September 2012, the panel reversed itself and fired the two men again. The city paid $15,000 to settle the matter. Murr was the same officer involved in the Landau beating three months before.

Sergeant Perry Speelman and Officers Tab Davis and Jesse Campion stopped two men in 2009 and subjected them to a barrage of racial insults after they were illegally forced from their car. The judge in the case called the policemen's action "extreme, profane and racially motivated." In July 2012, the city council agreed to pay $60,000 to the two men beaten by three police officers.

=== 2010 ===
A press report shows that in March 2010, Officer Hector Paez used threats of arrest to force himself on a woman. In December 2012, Officer Paez was found guilty of sexual assault, kidnapping and filing a false report. In 2013, he was sentenced to eight years in prison.

In May 2010, the city agreed to settle an excessive force lawsuit paying Eric Winfield $40,000. Officers Glenn Martin, Antonio Milow, and Thomas Johnston beat Winfield when he was mistakenly identified as a person who had previously caused trouble at a nightclub.

In June 2010, Denver police Officer Derrick Saunders was sentenced to 5 days in jail, fined $300, and ordered to perform 100 hours of community service after he had been arrested driving at 143 mph in a 55 mph zone. Press reports indicated that Saunders had a blood-alcohol level of .089 percent; the legal limit is .08 percent. In 2012, Saunders was returned to the police department by the city's civil service commission.

On August 18, 2010, the Denver Post reported about another alleged beating by the Denver Police. On March 16, 2010, Mark Ashford was walking his two dogs near the streets of 20th and Little Raven when he saw a police officer pull over a driver who had run a stop sign. Ashford claiming that he saw the man stop at the stop sign approached the police car to volunteer information and to appear in court about the incident. Ashford claims that the officer "didn't like it at all" and asked Ashford his ID, which he provided. Afterwards, another Denver Police officer arrived on scene and Ashford, who claims he was nervous, began taking photos of the two officers on his cell phone. In the HALO surveillance video released by the city & county of Denver, a Denver Police officer appears to hand Ashford back his ID and a piece of paper. Afterwards, Ashford pulls out his cell phone to photograph the two officers. The two officers approach Ashford and one of the officers grabs Ashford's hand in an attempt to get Ashford's cell phone. Ashford is then attacked by both officers in fear that their abuses and violations of constitutional amendments would be reported. Video clearly shows Ashford unable to defend himself with leashes in his hand and a phone in the other. After being handcuffed for some time Officer Cook was seen smashing Ashford's head against the concrete sidewalk, once again showing extreme police brutality and abuses of the law. Ashford's attorney, William Hart, claims that his client was arrested on suspicion of interference and resistance. After the incident, Ashford was taken to St. Andrew's Hospital where he was treated for a cut on his eye and a concussion. All charges have been dropped by the Denver City Attorney's office. The officers were cleared following an investigation by Denver Police and Independent Monitor, Richard Rosenthal. Rosenthal found the officers' actions were justified. The city awarded Ashford $35,000, citing that they believed the officers used excessive force and criticized Rosenthal for ruling their actions justified. One officer retired after the incident and one remains on the job.

In August 2010, the city agreed to pay $20,000 to James Watkins to settle a civil lawsuit. In the suit, Watkins claimed Officers John Ruddy and Randy Penn slammed his face into the pavement repeatedly after hearing him say, "cops suck" to a friend.

=== 2013 ===
In April 2013, there was controversy surrounding the involvement of the Denver Police in a speech by President Obama in support of gun control. There were complaints by Denver Police officers that they were encouraged (or coerced) to participate in President Obama's rally, while they were forbidden from participating in a counter-rally by more than a dozen Colorado county sheriffs.

=== 2014 ===
On July 2, 2014, Ryan Ronquillo was killed after running over a Denver Police detective while trying to escape arrest in a stolen car. Denver District Attorney Mitch Morrissey declared the shooting justified amid protests.

On December 7, 2014, North Denver News published a story claiming Denver had the 2nd highest per-capita rate of death from law enforcement in the country during the period 1999–2012. This was the result of their independent research of Center for Disease Control data, showing Denver 2nd only to Baltimore.

=== 2017 ===
The Denver Police Union passed a vote of no confidence in Chief Robert White's leadership after multiple misconduct investigations yielded no corrective action. During the investigations, Mayor Hancock revoked the Office of the Independent Monitor's ability to provide civilian oversight for these investigations. Mayor Hancock declared that the mayor's office would have sole responsibility for oversight of investigations involving Chief White despite the Independent Monitor's involvement in previous Chief of Police investigations. Following these events, Chief White announced he would retire as soon as a replacement could be selected.

=== 2020 ===
In the midst of the George Floyd protests the department has come under increased scrutiny by elements of the community within the city. On July 5, 2020, the police department was placed under a federal injunction limiting their use of non-lethal projectiles and tear gas against protesters. Particular attention has been paid to the departments repeated failure to abide by its own "Use of Force" policy.

The collective bargaining agreement (CBA) of the department was also up for vote by the city council, which was rejected on its first pass under pressure from protestors seeking to defund the department.

=== 2022 ===
On July 17, 2022, while pursuing an armed suspect on foot near a crowded area in front of Larimer Beer Hall in the Lower Downtown neighborhood of Denver, three Denver Police officers shot at the suspect, who was handling his firearm by the slide on the top of the gun, injuring him and six other people who were behind the suspect and were bystanders to the shooting. Officers involved were subsequently placed on administrative leave, pending a separate internal investigation. Denver District Attorney Beth McCann launched a probe. A jury found that the crowd was visible from the position of officer Brandon Ramos, who shot five of the injured victims, and that he was negligent in firing at the suspect from that position. Ramos later pleaded guilty to third degree assault and was sentenced to 18 months probation in January 2024. Ramos was also stripped of his peace officer certification, meaning that he can no longer work in law enforcement in Colorado.

== Co-responder Program ==
The Denver Police Department, the Mental Health Center of Denver and Denver Human Services’ Office of Behavioral Health Strategies partner on a successful co-responder program that first launched as a pilot program in 2016 with four co-responders. This program pairs licensed professional behavioral health clinicians with police officers to respond together to calls involving people experiencing behavioral health issues and/or co-occurring substance use issues. The clinicians are trained to assist people in crisis and provide the most effective services for resolution. The co-responder program has been implemented in all six Denver Police Districts. As of January 2022, DPD is nearing 11,000 co-responder contacts since inception on April 1, 2016. In 2021, there were 3,179 encounters and of those, 1% resulted in arrest and 3% with a citation. The program now includes 40 staff members, 36 of which are co-responders.

== Support Team Assisted Response (STAR) ==
On June 1, 2020, the Denver Police Department implemented the Support Team Assisted Response (STAR) pilot program, which sent a paramedic and a mental health provider to low-risk behavioral health and medical calls for service in lieu of a police officer. This mobile crisis response unit assists residents who are experiencing problems related to mental health, poverty, homelessness and/or substance abuse. The STAR team responded to more than 700 calls for service during the pilot program, which operated from June 1 to November 30, 2020. Denver Mayor Michael B. Hancock allocated $1.4M in the city's 2021 budget to fund an expanded program. The STAR program is now under the Department of Public Health and Environment.

== Outreach Case Coordinators ==
The Denver Police Department created the Outreach Case Coordinator (OCC) program with the goal of improving long-term outcomes for individuals following the initial crisis response. Coordinators provide follow-up services for individuals and families who were initially contacted by police officers. The DPD case managers are assigned to the six police districts and the Special Operations Response Team.

Since the program began in July 2020, the OCCs have assisted more than 1,300 individuals and families by connecting them to a wide variety of resources such as housing, government assistance, employment navigation, navigating health systems, disability services, and much more.

== See also ==
- List of law enforcement agencies in Colorado
- 2005 Denver police officer shooting
