= List of law enforcement agencies in Colorado =

Coordinates: 38.9972°N 105.5478°W

The location of the State of Colorado in the United States of America.

This is a list of law enforcement agencies in the U.S. state of Colorado.

According to the US Bureau of Justice Statistics' 2008 Census of State and Local Law Enforcement Agencies, the state had 246 law enforcement agencies employing 12,069 sworn police officers, about 245 for each 100,000 residents.

== State agencies ==
- Colorado Bureau of Investigation
- Colorado Department of Corrections
- Colorado Department of Natural Resources
- Colorado Department of Public Safety
- Colorado Division of Youth Services
- Colorado State Patrol
- Colorado Parks and Wildlife
- Colorado Rangers

== County agencies ==
- Adams County Sheriff's Office
- Alamosa County Sheriff's Office
- Arapahoe County Sheriff's Office
- Archuleta County Sheriff's Office
- Baca County Sheriff's Office
- Bent County Sheriff's Office
- Boulder County Sheriff's Office
- Broomfield Police Department
- Chaffee County Sheriff's Office
- Cheyenne County Sheriff's Office
- Clear Creek County Sheriff's Office
- Conejos County Sheriff's Office
- Costilla County Sheriff's Office
- Crowley County Sheriff's Office
- Custer County Sheriff's Office
- Delta County Sheriff's Office
- Denver Sheriff Department
- Dolores County Sheriff's Office
- Douglas County Sheriff's Office
- Eagle County Sheriff's Office
- El Paso County
  - El Paso County Coroner's Office
  - El Paso County Department of Human Services - Fraud & Investigations Unit
  - El Paso County Security Department
  - El Paso County Sheriff's Office
  - Humane Society of the Pikes Peak Region
  - El Paso Wildland Fire Management
- Elbert County Sheriff's Office
- Fremont County Sheriff's Office
- Garfield County Sheriff's Office
- Gilpin County Sheriff's Office
- Grand County Sheriff's Office
- Gunnison County Sheriff's Office
- Hinsdale County Sheriff's Office
- Huerfano County Sheriff's Office
- Jackson County Sheriff's Office
- Jefferson County Sheriff's Office
- Kiowa County Sheriff's Office
- Kit Carson County Sheriff's Office
- La Plata County Sheriff's Office
- Lake County Sheriff's Office
- Larimer County Sheriff's Office
- Las Animas County Sheriff's Office
- Lincoln County Sheriff's Office
- Logan County Sheriff's Office
- Mesa County Sheriff's Office
- Mineral County Sheriff's Office
- Moffat County Sheriff's Office
- Montezuma County Sheriff's Office
- Montrose County Sheriff's Office
- Morgan County Sheriff's Office
- Otero County Sheriff's Office
- Ouray County Sheriff's Office
- Park County Sheriff's Office
- Phillips County Sheriff's Office
- Pitkin County Sheriff's Office
- Prowers County Sheriff's Office
- Pueblo County Sheriff's Office
- Rio Blanco County Sheriff's Office
- Rio Grande County Sheriff's Office
- Routt County Sheriff's Office
- Saguache County Sheriff's Office
- San Juan County Sheriff's Office
- San Miguel County Sheriff's Office
- Sedgwick County Sheriff's Office
- Summit County Sheriff's Office
- Teller County Sheriff's Office
- Washington County Sheriff's Office
- Weld County Sheriff's Office
- Yuma County Sheriff's Office

== Municipality agencies ==
- Alamosa Police Department
- Arvada Police Department
- Aspen Police Department
- Ault Police Department
- Aurora Police Department
- Arvada Police Department
- Avon Police Department
- Basalt Police Department
- Bayfield Marshal's Office
- Black Hawk Police Department
- Blanca Police Department
- Boulder Police Department
- Breckenridge Police Department
- Brighton Police Department
- Broomfield Police Department
- Brush Police Department
- Buena Vista Police Department
- Burlington Police Department
- Calhan Police Department
- Cañon City Police Department
- Castle Rock Police Department
- Cedaredge Police Department
- Center Police Department
- Colorado Springs Police Department
- Columbine Valley Police Department
- Commerce City Police Department
- Cortez Police Department
- Craig Police Department
- Crested Butte Marshal's Office
- Cripple Creek Police Department
- Dacono Police Department
- DeBeque Marshal's Department
- Delta Police Department
- Denver Police Department
- Durango Police Department
- Eagle Police Department
- Edgewater Police Department
- Englewood Police Department
- Erie Police Department
- Estes Park Police Department
- Evans Police Department
- Federal Heights Police Department
- Fairplay Police Department
- Firestone Police Department
- Florence Police Department
- Fort Collins Police Services
- Fort Lupton Police Department
- Fort Morgan Police Department
- Fountain Police Department
- Frederick Police Department
- Frisco Police Department
- Fruita Police Department
- Fowler Police Department
- Glendale Police Department
- Glenwood Springs Police Department
- Golden Police Department
- Grand Junction Police Department
- Greeley Police Department
- Green Mountain Falls Marshal's Office
- Greenwood Village Police Department
- Gunnison Police Department
- Idaho Springs Police Department
- Johnstown Police Department
- La Junta Police Department
- Lakeside Police Department
- Lakewood Police Department
- Lamar Police Department
- Littleton Police Department
- Lochbuie Police Department
- Log Lane Village Police Department
- Lone Tree Police Department
- Longmont Public Safety
- Louisville Police Department
- Loveland Police Department
- Manitou Springs Police Department
- Manassa Police Department
- Mancos Marshal's Office
- Meeker Police Department
- Montrose Police Department
- Mountain View Police Department
- Monument Police Department
- Mt. Crested Police Department
- New Castle Police Department
- Northglenn Police Department
- Nunn Police Department
- Olathe Police Department
- Ouray Police Department
- Paonia Police Department
- Parker Police Department
- Platteville Police Department
- Pueblo Police Department
- Ridgway Marshal's Office
- Rifle Police Department
- Rocky Ford Police Department
- Salida Police Department
- Sanford Police Department
- Severance Police Department
- Sheridan Police Department
- Silt Police Department
- Silverthorne Police Department
- Simla Police Department
- Snowmass Village Police Department
- South Fork Police Department
- Steamboat Springs Police Department
- Telluride Marshal's Office
- Thornton Police Department
- Trinidad Police Department
- Vail Police Department
- Walsenburg Police Department (disbanded in 2016, re-established in 2025)
- Westminster Police Department
- Wheat Ridge Police Department
- Wiggins Police Department
- Windsor Police Department
- Wray Police Department
- Yuma Police Department

== Tribal agencies ==
- Navajo Nation Police
- Navajo Rangers
- Southern Ute Police
- Ute Mountain Ute Tribal Police Department

== College and university agencies ==
- Adams State College Public Safety Department
- Arapahoe Community College Campus Police Department
- Auraria Campus Police Department
- Colorado School of Mines Police Department
- Colorado State University Police Department
- Fort Lewis College Police Department
- Pikes Peak State College Police Department
- Red Rocks Community College Campus Police Department
- University of Colorado Anschutz Medical Campus Police Department
- University of Colorado at Colorado Springs Department of Public Safety
- University of Colorado Denver Police Department
- University of Colorado Police Department
- University of Northern Colorado Police Department

== Disbanded/Defunct agencies ==
- Antonito Police Department
- Central City Police Department - Disbanded in 2016.
- Berthoud Police Department (Disbanded in 2014)
- Gilcrest Police Department
- Las Animas Police Department
- Morrison Police Department (Disbanded in 2025)
- Kiowa Police Department (Disbanded in 2019)

== See also ==
- List of law enforcement agencies
- List of United States state and local law enforcement agencies
- Bibliography of Colorado
- Geography of Colorado
- History of Colorado
- Index of Colorado-related articles
- List of Colorado-related lists
- Outline of Colorado
