= Colorado Bureau of Investigation =

Law enforcement agency in Lakewood, Colorado, U.S.

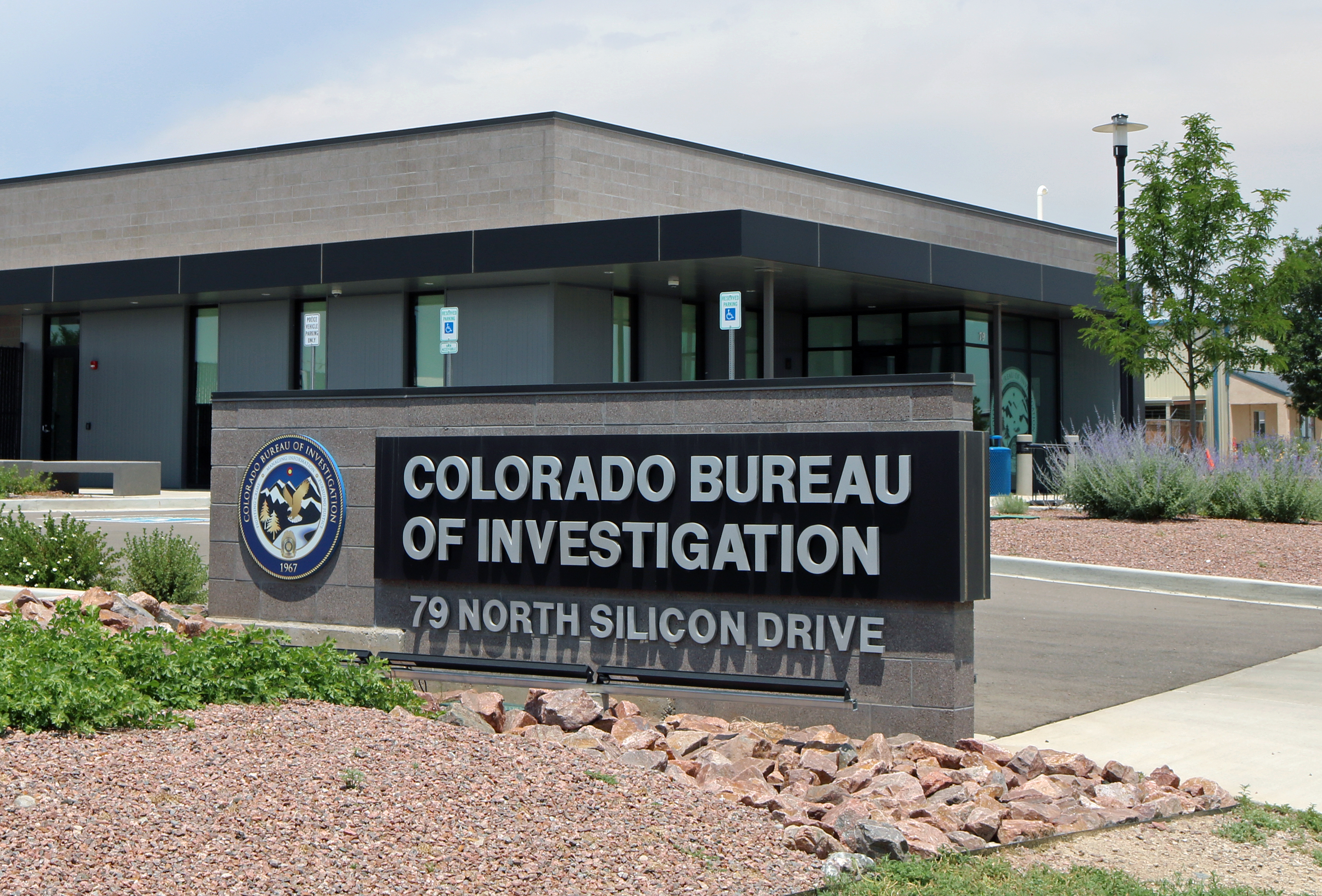
- The CBI office in Pueblo West.

Agency overview
- Type: law enforcement
- Jurisdiction: Colorado
- Headquarters: 690 Kipling St., Ste. 3000, Lakewood, Colorado, U.S., 80215
- Agency executive: Armando Saldate III, Director
- Parent department: Colorado Department of Public Safety
- Website: www.colorado.gov/cbi

Colorado Bureau of Investigation (CBI), a division of Colorado Department of Public Safety, is a law enforcement agency of the state of Colorado that performs forensic and laboratory services and criminal investigations at the request of local and state law enforcement agencies and district attorneys. Headquartered in Lakewood, Colorado, United States, they investigate arson, homicides, sexual assaults, fraud, cyber, identity theft, and other crimes. Their forensic services include DNA, biology, firearm, latent print, toxicology and drug chemistry analysis. Other units in the CBI include Crime Scene Services, Crime Information Management Unit, Criminal Justice Information Systems, and Colorado's InstaCheck Unit. The CBI is designated by the Federal Bureau of Investigation (FBI), Criminal Justice Information Services (CJIS) Division, as the CJIS Systems Agency for Colorado. It is headquartered in the Denver suburb of Lakewood at 690 Kipling Street.

They work in concert with other organizations, such as the Federal Bureau of Investigation, Drug Enforcement Administration, county sheriff's offices, district attorney's offices, state police, and other law enforcement agencies.

The agency was established in 1967, and was initially led by former Colorado Supreme Court Justice Hilbert Schauer, who was named directed based on his performance in a civil service examination. As of 1999, the investigation into the death of JonBenét Ramsey was the largest single case load, with more than 3,000 work hours for 2,509 laboratory specimen analysis and 25,520 lab examinations. In the summer of 1998, the Cortez police officer shooting resulted in 2,830 investigative hours by CBI agents. (Hunting Badger was inspired by the shooting death of Dale Claxton).

The Colorado Bureau of Investigation, which performs background checks for firearm purchases, was involved in the case of Trader James Gowda, a firearms dealer for more than 20 years. It was described as the largest gun-trafficking case in history (as of 2000) by a Bureau of Alcohol, Tobacco and Firearms Denver office employee. Gowda sold thousands of firearms at gun shows, mostly without background check paperwork. Under federal law, every firearm dealer's customer is required to have a background check. Gowda only performed background checks with the CBI on 15 customers between 1994 and 1996 and, after he was indicted by a federal grand jury, no more than 10 gun customers between January 1999 and June 2000. The CBI conducts all Colorado background checks of gun buyers except for one four-month period in 1999.

In 2004, the Rocky Mountain Gun Owners lobbied for a bill that would have erased the Colorado Bureau of Investigation's database of concealed-weapons permit holders. Prior to 2007 permit holders were classified as "persons of interest" by the CBI. In 2007 the CBI moved permit holders out of that classification. Despite previous extensions of the law that allowed for the statewide database, the General Assembly did not renew the database and instead let it sunset.

CBI's Arvada lab was updated in 2016 with a "state-of-the-art forensic science laboratory" to improve their laboratory capability and efficiency in rape kit and toxicology testing. The $7 million renovation was funded by House Bill 1020 to ensure that the state met standards for rape kit testing. The Arvada laboratory, the largest of CBI's facilities, analyzes evidence from more than 10,000 cases and process more than 40,000 items of evidence each year.

== DNA Scandal ==
The Bureau has been impacted by the conduct of a former CBI DNA scientist, Yvonne "Missy" Woods, who allegedly manipulated material facts and excluded exculpatory evidence. CBI has identified 652 cases impacted by Woods' data manipulation between 2008 and 2023. A review of her work from 1994 to 2008 is also underway. According to the Colorado Sun, prosecutors worry more than 1,000 convictions could have relied on dubious evidence.

== See also ==
- List of law enforcement agencies in Colorado
- State of Colorado
- State bureau of investigation
