= 2005 Denver police officer shooting =

On May 8, 2005, two Denver police officers were shot in a Denver, Colorado dance hall by Raúl Gómez-García, a Mexican national and undocumented immigrant to the United States. One victim, Detective Donald "Donnie" Young, was killed, while the other, Detective John Bishop, was wounded. The incident sparked questions surrounding illegal immigration in the U.S. and created an international incident with Mexico, where Gómez-García was apprehended.

== Shooting ==
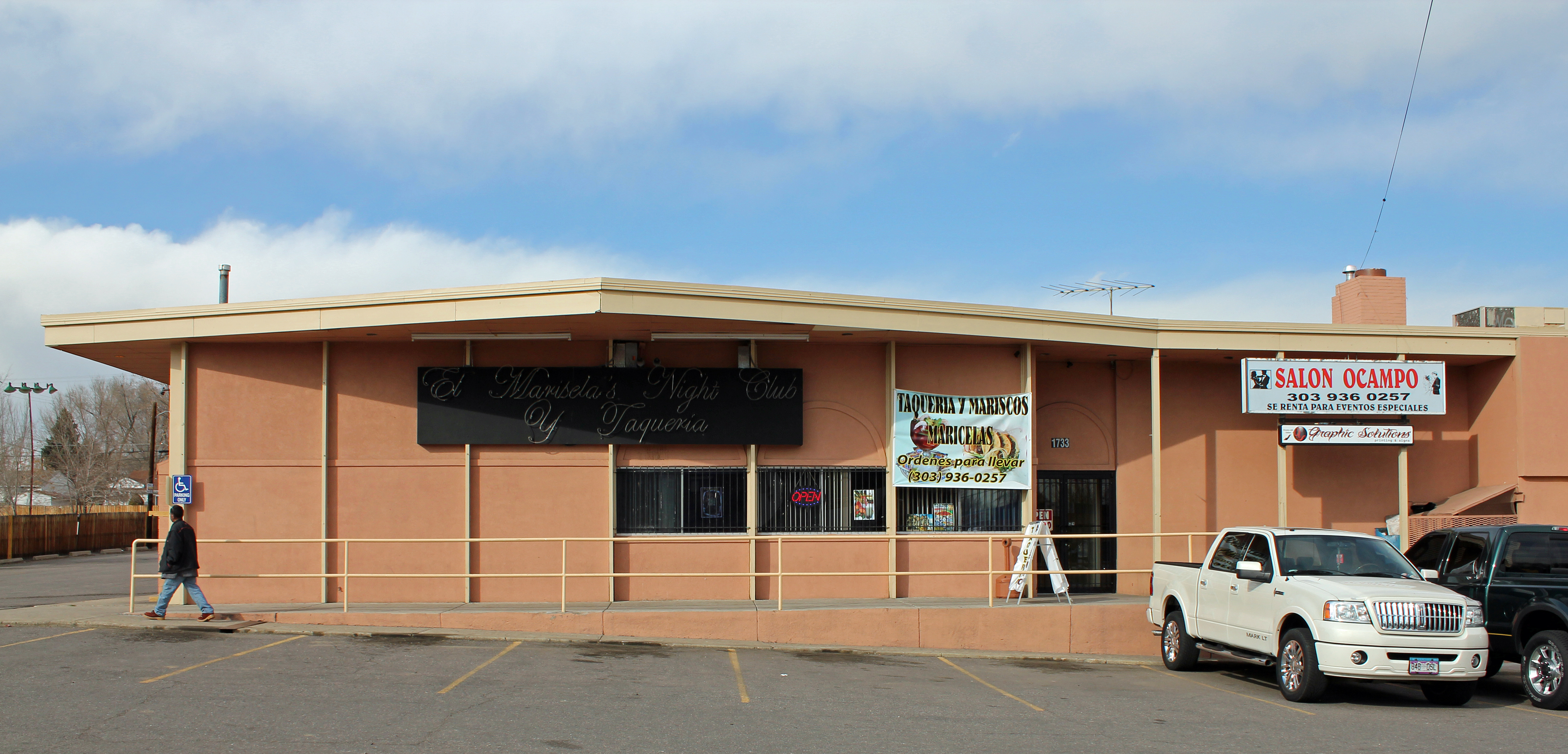
Salon Ocampo, the site of the shooting.

From the evening of May 7 until the early morning of May 8 (Mother's Day), 2005, Denver Police Detectives Donnie Young and John Bishop were working off-duty providing security at the Salon Ocampo Hall. The hall was hosting an invitation-only baptismal party. On the evening of May 7, Young and Bishop escorted Raúl Gómez-García out of the hall. Gómez-García returned about 1 a.m., approached both detectives from behind, and shot Donnie Young three times, including one shot to the head. Gómez-García also shot John Bishop once in the chest, but Bishop was not killed due to his bulletproof vest.

Raúl Gómez-García, a.k.a. Raúl García-Gómez, was an undocumented immigrant working at the "Cherry Cricket," a restaurant owned by the then Denver Mayor John Hickenlooper. Gómez-García used forged identification to obtain a job as a dishwasher.

Prior to the shooting, Gómez-García had been stopped three times for traffic violations. Gómez-García fled to his native Mexico where he was arrested June 4, 2005.

== Extradition ==
In 1978, the United States signed a treaty with Mexico that acknowledged Mexico's right not to extradite one of its citizens if the citizen faced the death penalty. The Mexican Supreme Court also declared it against the law to extradite a Mexican citizen facing life in prison without the possibility of parole. The Mexican Consul announced that unless the Mexican government received assurances that Gómez-García would not face either of these punishments, there would be no extradition. The mandatory penalty for first degree murder in Colorado is either execution or life in prison without the possibility of parole.

As a result of this potential outcome, Colorado Representative Bob Beauprez introduced legislation before the United States House to cut foreign aid to countries that refused to extradite people suspected of murdering American law enforcement agents. This bill was signed into law in November 2005. One local radio personality declared that if anything good came of Young's death it would be because it would highlight the problem of illegal immigration.

While murdering a police officer is usually a capital offense in Colorado, on June 9, 2005, Denver District Attorney Mitch Morrisey announced that Gómez-García would be charged with second degree murder and first degree attempted murder. These charges posed a maximum of 32–96 years in prison. Morrisey justified the charges, stating, "It is my understanding that I would be prohibited from extraditing him if I sought first-degree murder charges in this case."

== Trial ==
In his trial Gómez-García claimed that he only wanted to scare the officers, but the arresting officers and his ex-girlfriend testified that he was proud to have murdered Officer Young. He testified that he was humiliated by Young, but that it was the heckling of his friends that drove him to return to the dance hall to shoot the police officers.

On October 26, 2006 Gómez-García was convicted and sentenced to the maximum punishment of 80 years. He was wearing the number "13", a symbol associated with the street gang Sureños, shaved into his hair. The judge expressed the opinion the sentence was not severe enough.

As of 2024, Gómez-García is serving his sentence at the Limon Correctional Facility in Limon, Colorado. He will be eligible for parole in 2053, at which point he will be 67 years old.

== Crime Stoppers controversy ==
Florencia Castañeda Rodríguez, Gómez-García's grandmother, was instrumental in the arrest of Raul Gómez-García. Without her help, the Mexican authorities would not have known where to find Gómez-García. Crime Stoppers had offered an award of $100,000 for information leading to the arrest and conviction of Raul Gómez-García. Crime Stoppers, however, declared that Mrs. Rodríguez was ineligible for the reward money because she did not contact them before notifying the Mexican authorities of her grandson's whereabouts. This decision by Crime Stoppers was heavily criticized in Denver area media, where Mrs. Rodríguez was portrayed as a "very poor" napkin maker whose house was destroyed by a hurricane.
