= Colorado State Patrol =

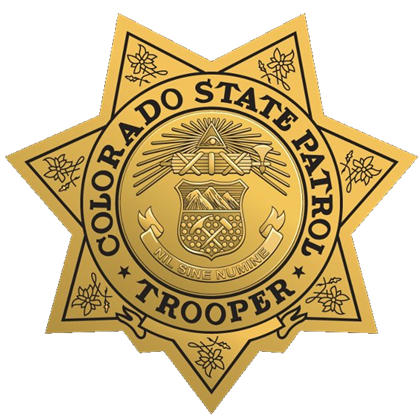
- Badge of Colorado State Patrol
- Abbreviation: CSP
- Motto: BE COURTEOUS BUT FIRM

Agency overview
- Formed: September 23, 1935; 91 years ago
- Preceding agency: Colorado State Highway Courtesy Patrol
- Employees: 1,138 (as of 2020)
- Annual budget: $178,218,000

Jurisdictional structure
- Operations jurisdiction: Colorado, USA
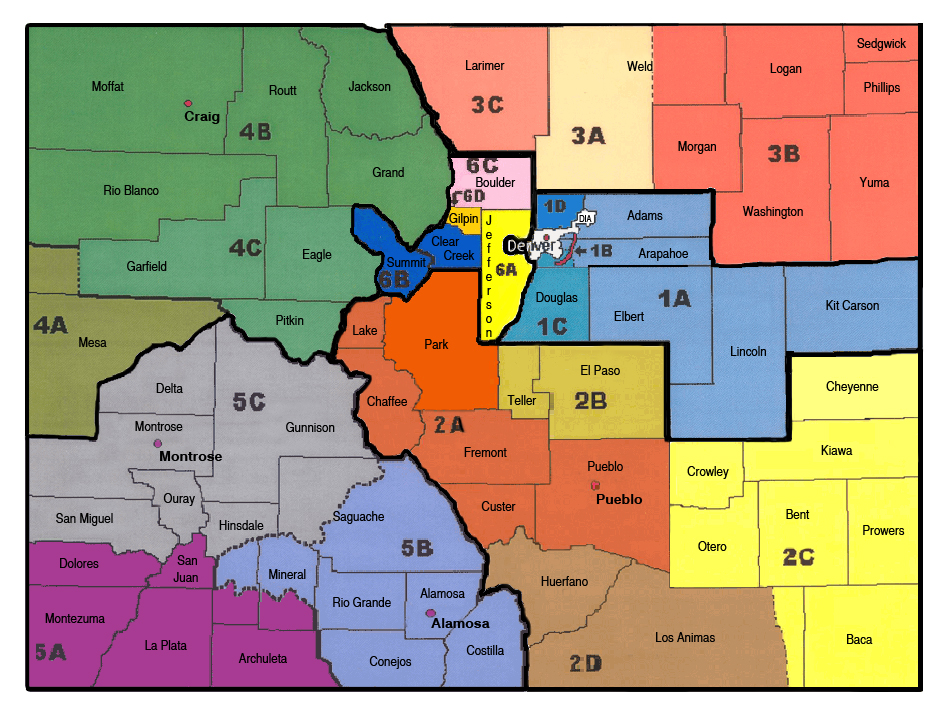
- Colorado State Patrol Districts
- Area: 104,185 square miles (269,840 km^{2})
- Population: 5,758,736 (2019 est.)
- General nature: Civilian police

Operational structure
- Headquarters: Lakewood, Colorado
- Sworn members: 701 (actual, as of 2022)
- Unsworn members: Approx. 380
- Agency executive: Colonel Matthew C. Packard, Chief
- Parent agency: Colorado Department of Public Safety

Facilities
- Districts: 19 Troop Offices

Website
- web.archive.org/web/20141203233229/https://www.colorado.gov/csp

The Colorado State Patrol (CSP; originally known as the Colorado State Highway Courtesy Patrol), based in Lakewood, Colorado, is a division of the Colorado Department of Public Safety, and is one of the official state police agencies of Colorado, along with the Colorado Bureau of Investigation (CBI), Colorado Division of Criminal Justice (DCJ), Colorado Division of Fire Prevention & Control (DFPC), and Colorado Division of Homeland Security and Emergency Management (DHSEM). Additionally, the Executive Director's Office supports operations of the five divisions and houses the Colorado School Safety Resource Center (CSSRC) and Colorado Integrated Criminal Justice Information Systems (CJIS). The CSP primarily enforces traffic laws on interstates and state highways and guards the state capitol and the Governor of Colorado.

== History ==
Senate Bill No. 6 in 1935 created the Colorado State Highway Courtesy Patrol. With just thirty-five men selected from 6,000 applicants, the new Patrolmen arrived in Golden for training. The Patrol Board was made up of E.E. Wheeler, the Chairman of the State PUC, Charles Vail, Chief Engineer of Highways and James H. Carr, the Secretary of State. In 1935, the Colorado State Courtesy Patrol was added as the Division of Patrol, to the Division of Highways. The Patrols title was changed in 1945 to Colorado State Highway Patrol. The Patrol Act also created a Port of Entry or Welcome for inspection of trucks of Interstate Commerce. In 1936, thirty POE Officers were hired to collect road taxes which amounted to $500,000. In 1953, a reorganization created the Department of Highways. In 1968, another name change to Highway Department happened with the subdivisions of Highway, Planning and Patrol, which the CSP fell under. In 1983, the Department of Public Safety was created and the CSP was transferred under the Director of Public Safety.

The patrol was met with opposition from the public when it was formed, as well as from other law enforcement agencies, who thought the patrol would endanger their jurisdiction. Therefore, Colorado legislature carefully outlined the duties of the agency in the Patrol Act, which says that "it shall be their duty to promote safety, protect human life and preserve the highways of Colorado by the intelligent, courteous, and strict enforcement of the laws and regulation of this state relating to highways". This became the motto of the Colorado State Patrol.

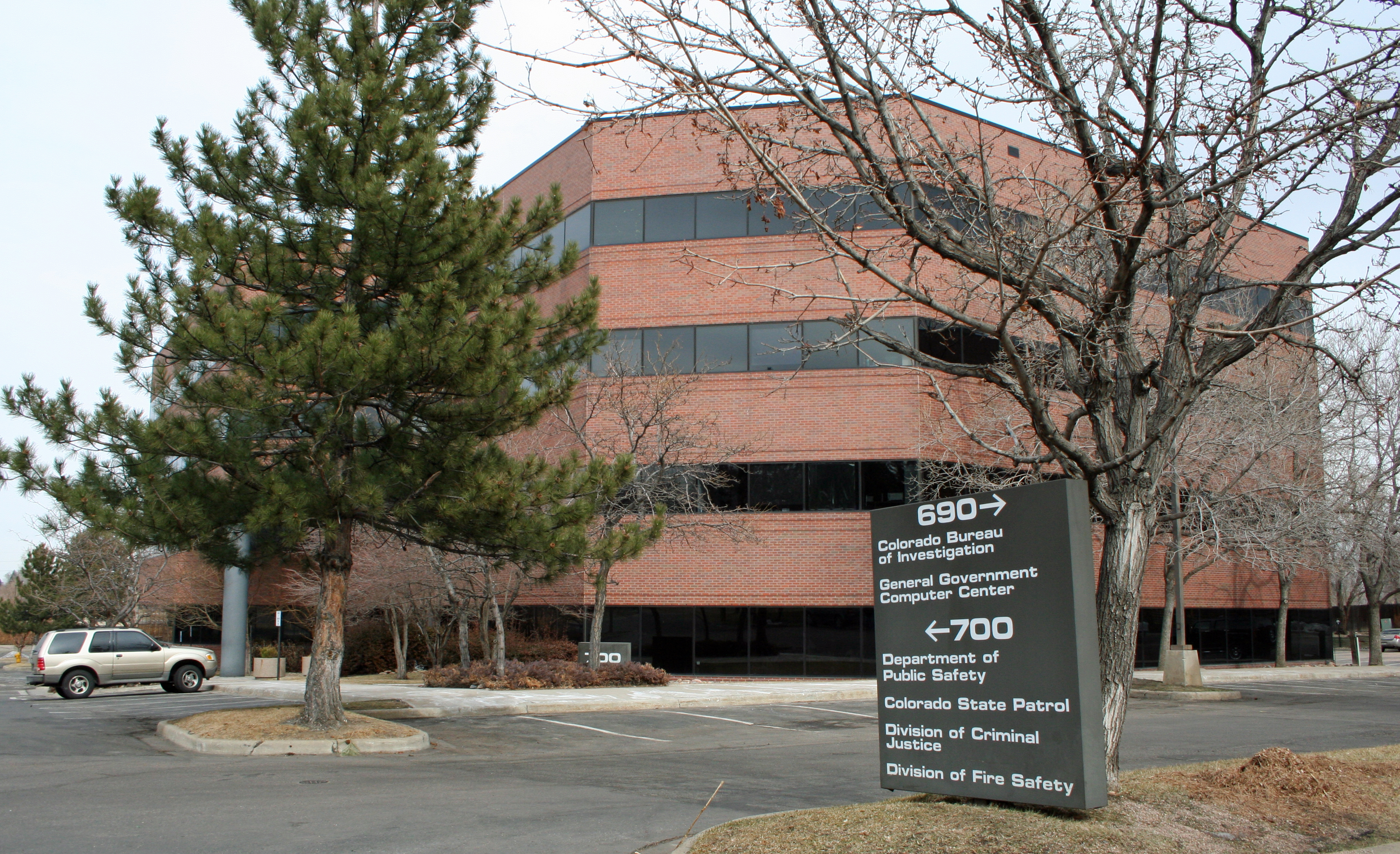
The Colorado State Patrol headquarters is located in Lakewood, Colorado.

The notorious Ludlow Massacre near Trinidad in 1914 spoiled any attempts in forming a state police. While a police organization was not involved, Colorado did not want a police force to act upon the orders of the governor, especially in a labor strike. Today, Colorado State Patrol officers are not allowed to act as guards in strikes or labor disputes.

In 1915, Colorado voted to become a “dry” state to begin January 1, 1916. There are stories of Adolph Coors dumping thousands of gallons of beer into Clear Creek on the first day of 1916. National Prohibition began on January 20, 1920 as the Volstead Act/18th Amendment. Prohibition in Colorado lasted until December 5, 1933 with the repeal of Prohibition or the 21st Amendment.

With state prohibition, Colorado created Prohibition Agents to enforce state liquor laws in 1915. Most agents were local police and sheriffs deputies. In 1923, the Colorado Law Enforcement Department was created as an extension of the Prohibition Department and to assist police and sheriffs in case of emergencies. Due to questions about the Governor using Colorado officers in labor disputes, the department was downsized to a Chief (Lewis Scherf) and five agents in 1929. Members of the department were mostly Colorado Peace Officers or citizens serving in an honorary capacity. In 1933, the Law Enforcement Department was totally abolished.

The State Department of Safety was created to protect/augment military war industries in Colorado in 1917. The department was to be abolished after World War I and was folded into the Colorado Rangers.

The Motor Vehicle Department, Auto Theft and Colorado Motor Police each have their beginnings in the 1920s. They were all disbanded in 1935, with the creation of the Colorado State Highway Courtesy Patrol.

In 1935, the Colorado State Courtesy Patrol was added as the Division of Patrol, while the highway maintenance was renamed Division of Highways.

In 1953, a reorganization created the Department of Highways. In 1968, another name change to Highway Department occurred with the subdivisions of Highway, Planning and Patrol.

In 1983, the Department of Public Safety was created and the CSP was transferred under the Director of Public Safety.

== Weapons and tools ==
Until the switch to auto-loading semi-automatic pistols, the CSP carried blue steel, 4-inch barreled Colt Python revolvers. CSP then went to the Smith & Wesson Model 4006 .40 S&W in a Melonite (black) finish with the agency's seal engraved in the slide. CSP troopers now carry the Shadow Systems XR920 9 mm.

All CSP troopers are issued an ASP baton and OC, with Tasers being issued in 2011.

Starting in 2019, all CSP troopers were issued a Sionic Patrol Rifle chambered in .223.

In 2020, the CSP transitioned to the Smith & Wesson M&P 2.0 .40.

In 2023, the CSP switched from Smith & Wesson to the Shadow Systems XR920, MR920 and CR920 model pistols.

== Vehicles and aircraft ==
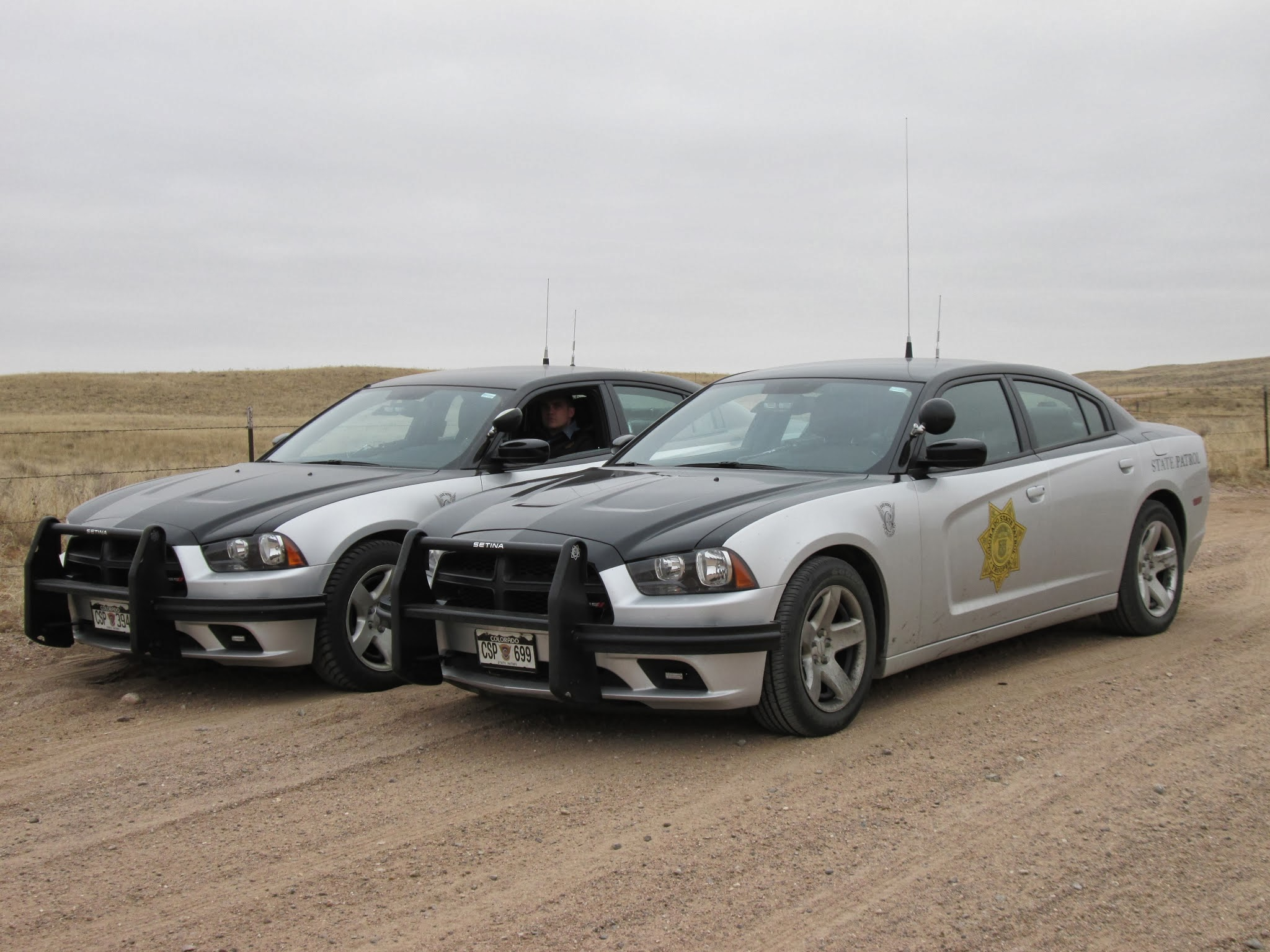
Colorado State Patrol Dodge Chargers near Sterling, CO

In 2009, after many years of using Ford Crown Victoria patrol cars, the CSP began introducing Dodge Chargers into its fleet. The CSP has also used Chevrolet Tahoes, Ford Police Interceptors (both sedan and utility models) and Chevrolet Caprices. In 2021, CSP announced they would be transitioning to the Dodge Durango to replace their Chargers over a five year span.

The Hazardous Materials and Motor Carrier Safety sections use Ford F-150 trucks.

The CSP operates five fixed wing aircraft.

- One Beechcraft King Air
- One Pilatus PC-12
- Two Cessna 182s

The Colorado State Patrol Motor Operations unit used Harley-Davidson motorcycles until 2010. From 2010 to 2012, the Kawasaki Concours was phased in. In 2015, CSP switched to the BMW R1200RTP Police motorcycle. Motor Officers are assigned to individual field troops and ride year round.

== Activities ==
Specific duties include:

- Enforcing all traffic laws of the state of Colorado on approximately 8,483 miles (13,652 km) of state highways and more than 57,000 miles (92,000 km) of county roads.
- Directing, controlling and regulating motor vehicle traffic on public roadways.
- Inspecting vehicles for safety-related equipment violations.
- Inspecting vehicles carrying livestock for brand inspection certificates.
- Providing community education and administer safety programs to the public.
- Regulating road closures for special events, inclement weather, or when necessary to prevent further injury or damage following an emergency.
- Promulgating and enforcing rules and regulations for commercial motor vehicles.
- Operating a statewide law enforcement telecommunications system.
- Performing criminal interdiction on Colorado highways, focusing on the transport of illegal drugs.
- Assisting in state homeland security efforts.
- Providing emergency assistance in the event of major disasters, civil protests, or when requested by local law enforcement.

== Rank structure ==
=== Commissioned officers ===
Rank	Insignia	Description
Colonel		The Rank Of Colonel is held by the Chief of the Colorado State Patrol
Lieutenant Colonel		Region Commanders have The Rank Of Lieutenant Colonel
Major		Majors are District/Branch Commanders
Captain		Captains are Troop/Section Commanders

=== Non-commissioned officers ===
Rank	Insignia
Sergeant Major	
Master Sergeant	
Sergeant	
Corporal	
Master Trooper and Technician	
Trooper	

== Special programs ==
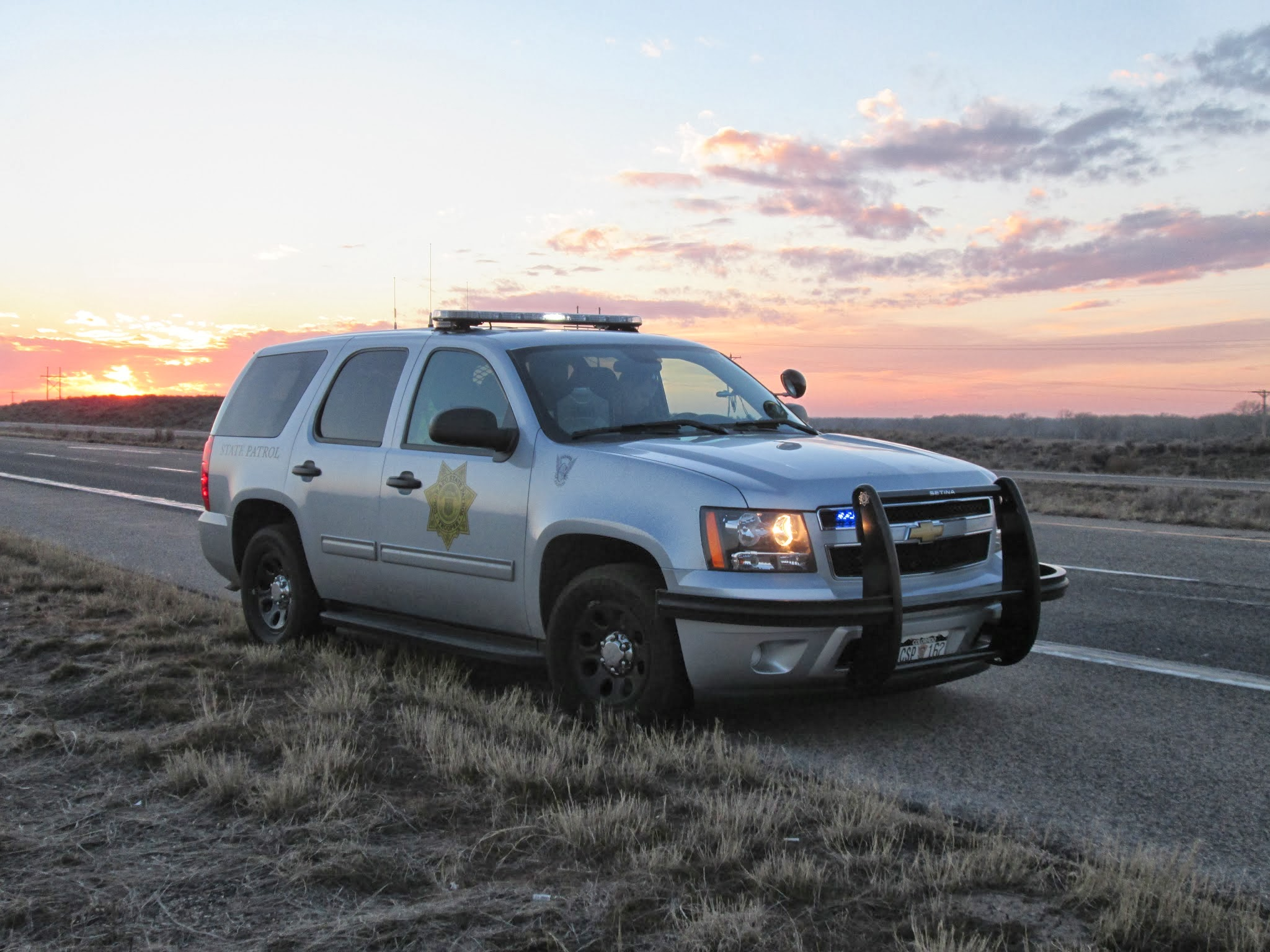
Colorado State Patrol Chevrolet Tahoe near Sterling, CO

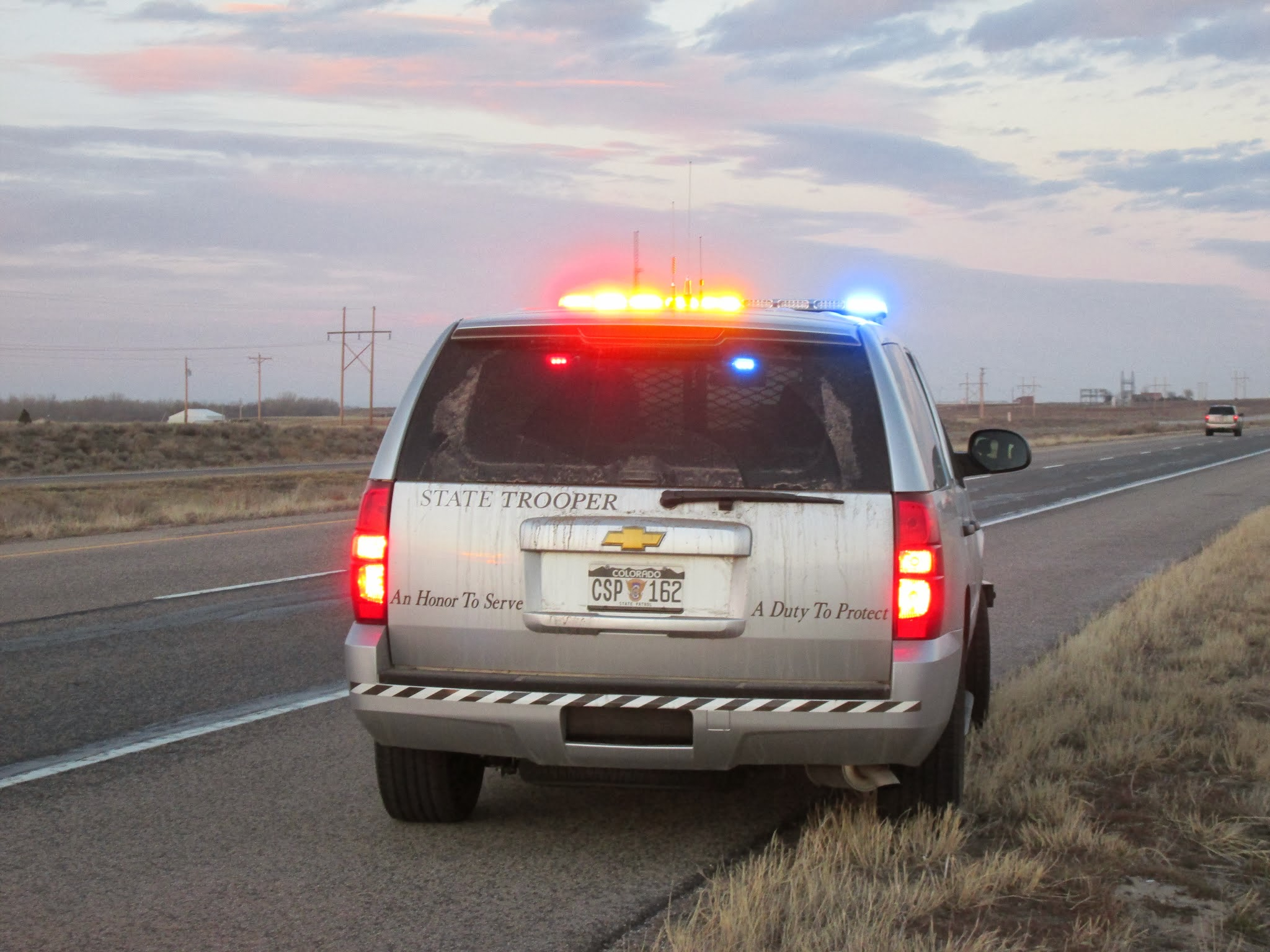
Colorado State Patrol Chevrolet Tahoe near Sterling, CO

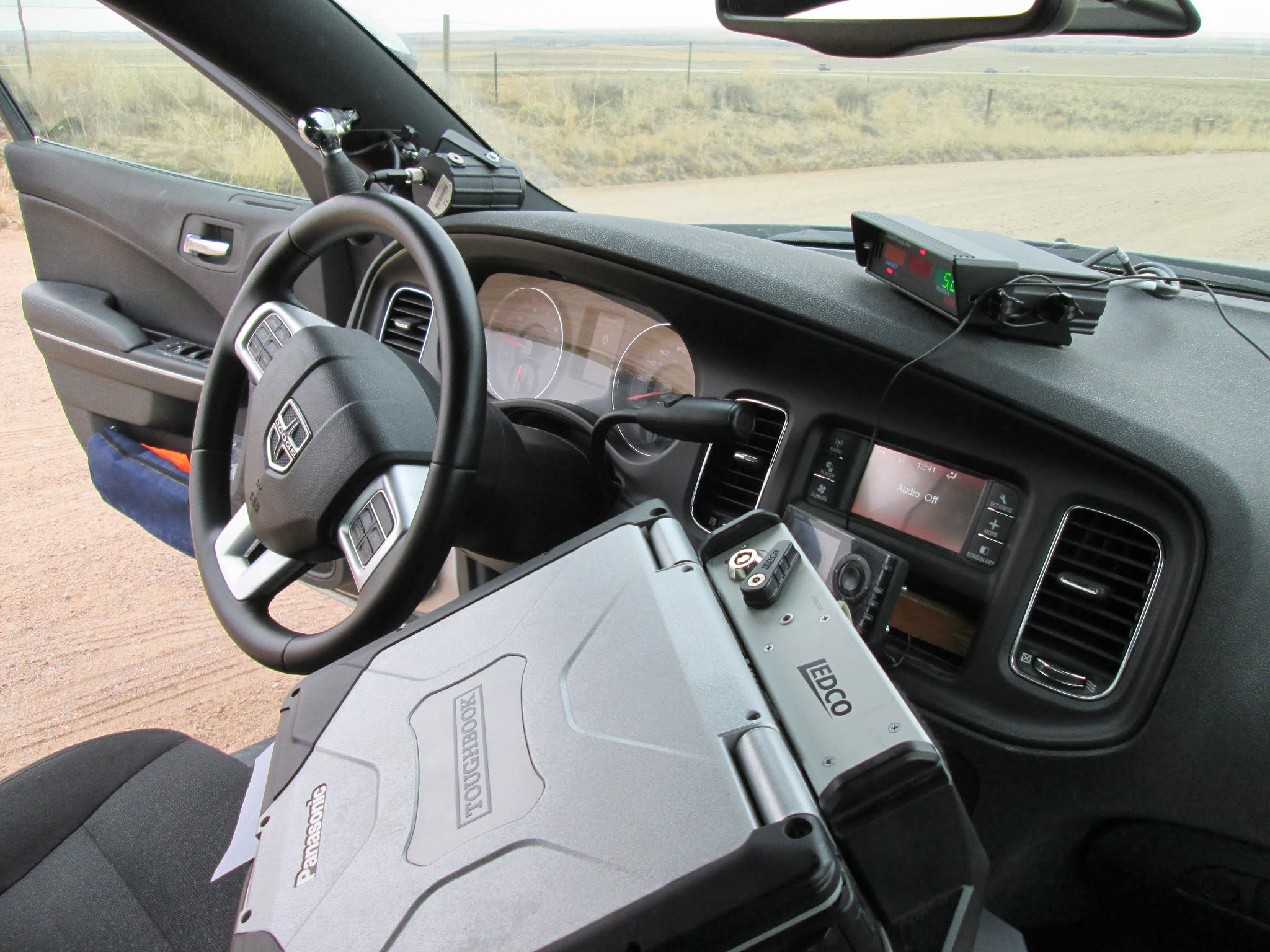
Interior of Colorado State Patrol Dodge Charger patrol vehicle

=== Alive at 25 ===
A community program designed to impact the future of traffic safety, Alive at 25 focuses educational effort to youths between the ages of 14 and 25. Its emphasis is to identify and reduce risky driving behavior.

== Specialty units ==
CSP specialty units include:

- Vehicular Crimes Unit
- Aircraft Section
- Canine Team (narcotic and explosive detection)
- Executive Security Branch
- Hazardous Materials Section
- Homeland Security Section
- Smuggling and Trafficking Interdiction Section
- Investigative Services Section
- Motor Carrier Safety Section
- Motorcycle Unit
- Evidence Section
- Special Operations and Response (SOAR)

== Fallen troopers ==
Since its establishment in 1935, 30 troopers have died while on duty or while employed with the Colorado State Patrol.

=== Line of Duty Deaths ===
- Struck by Vehicle/Vehicular Assault: 10
- Automobile Crash: 8
- Gunfire: 7
- Vehicle Pursuit: 1
- Motorcycle Crash: 1
- Drowning: 1
- Exposure to Toxins: 1
- Fall: 1

== See also ==
- Highway patrol
- Government of Colorado
- List of law enforcement agencies in Colorado
- State police (United States)
