= James Gowda =

James Gowda (born 1942), also known as Jim Gowda, a firearms dealer for more than 20 years was indicted by a federal grand jury in November 1999 on charges of selling up to 10,000 handguns to people who did not live in Colorado, selling a semi-automatic weapon to a felon, and dealing guns without a license. He was indicted with Waldemar Drwall, who was an associate of Gowda. It was described as the "largest gun-trafficking case" (as of 2000) that the agency knew of by Chris Eastburn, a Bureau of Alcohol, Tobacco and Firearms Denver office inspector. It is estimated that criminals used hundreds of guns purchased from Gowda in the commission of their crimes, according to the Brady Center to Prevent Gun Violence.

Gowda was reported to have only had a "handful" of federal sales forms for the sale of firearms at gun shows. He claimed that he was selling guns from his personal collection. Gowda sold thousands of firearms at gun shows in various states, including the state of Colorado, mostly without background check paperwork. He also sold guns from his suburban Denver home, which he licensed as a gun business. Under federal law, every firearm dealer's customer is required to have a background check. Gowda performed background checks with the Colorado Bureau of Investigation (CBI) on only 15 customers between 1994 and 1996 and, after he was indicted by a federal grand jury, no more than 10 gun customers between January 1999 and June 2000. The CBI conducted all Colorado background checks of gun buyers except for one four-month period in 1999.

Gowda pleaded guilty and in a plea agreement agreed "to cooperate fully with the government's investigation" into his gun sales and forfeit 225 guns seized from his house in 1996. The government agreed to recommended a 10 to 16-month prison term at a January sentencing date. In addition, the recommendation was to include a provision that half of the time could be served in detention in his house.

Gowda filed a suit with the Colorado District Court in Jefferson County requesting that his sentence be vacated and/or an illegal sentence corrected, which was denied by presiding Federal District Judge Wiley Y. Daniel.

== Background ==
Gowda began selling guns in 1978. He and Waldemar Drwall were soon indicted on charges of selling handguns to people who did not live in Colorado and dealing guns without a license. He pleaded guilty to one charge of selling a handgun to someone from Wyoming. His indictment was dropped when he entered a pretrial diversion program. He licensed his Arvada house as a business location between 1981 and 1999, which was precluded by an Arvada ordinance against residential retail sales, and with his wife sold firearms in gun shows in the western United States. A review by ATF inspector Melanie Shea in February 1990 resulted in a warning. His house was raided in 1996 and 227 guns were found in his basement, 223 of the guns were seized by federal prosecutors. Forms were found that showed that thousands of guns had been purchased but there were only a "handful" of federal firearm sales forms. There were also sales records that showed only minimal income from gun sales. Gowda continued to sell arms at gun shows after his November 1999 indictment. Informants and undercover agents found that he continued to sell guns without sales forms and background checks at Tulsa, Phoenix, Las Vegas and several Colorado gun shows. He signed the name "Jim Phillips" on one handwritten receipt.

Joe St. Veltri, Gowda's attorney claimed that since the media attention of the Columbine High School massacre, there had been a change in the law enforcement community regarding firearms sales. Alcohol, Tobacco and Firearms "now focuses some of its law enforcement efforts in an area that they had ignored. [...] I think gun shows, in the last two years, have become the most important concern of ATF," according to Veltri. The bureau's Denver enforcement chief, Gerald Petrilli, agreed. He said that better investigative techniques and enforcement strategy and improved manpower have resulted in more federal court cases.
