= Aurora Police Department =

- Seal of the Aurora Police
- Common name: Aurora Police
- Abbreviation: APD
- Motto: "To make Aurora safer every day"

Agency overview
- Formed: 1907; 119 years ago
- Employees: 981
- Annual budget: $129 million

Jurisdictional structure
- Operations jurisdiction: Aurora, Colorado, United States|U.S.
- Jurisdiction of Aurora Police Department
- Area: 154.19 square miles (399 km^{2})
- Population: 361,710 (2016)
- General nature: Local civilian police

Operational structure
- Headquarters: 15001 East Alameda Parkway, Aurora, CO 80012
- Police Officers: 744 (2020)
- Civilian employees: 168
- Elected officer responsible: Mike Coffman, Mayor of Aurora
- Agency executives: Todd Chamberlain, Chief of Police; Chris Juul, Acting Deputy Chief; Kevin Barnes, Patrol Division Chief; Mark Hildebrand, Investigations Division Chief; Chad Cerinich, Special Operations Division Chief; Phillip Rathbun, Professional Standards and Training Division Acting Division Chief

Website
- https://www.auroragov.org/residents/public_safety/police

The Aurora Police Department (APD) is a law enforcement agency serving the City of Aurora, Colorado, United States and some surrounding areas. Its headquarters are at 15001 East Alameda Parkway. APD is one of the largest municipal police departments in Colorado, and the second largest police department in the Denver-Metro area.

The department has been embroiled in numerous scandals related to police misconduct.

== Organization ==
The Aurora Police Department currently employs 744 officers and 168 civilians.

=== Rank structure ===
Rank	Insignia
Chief of Police	
Deputy Chief of Police	
Division Chief	
Commander	
Captain	
Lieutenant	
Sergeant	
Agent	
Police Officer Specialist	
Police Officer	N/A

The Aurora Police Department is a full-service police department that retains many specialized units or roles including:

Police Area Representative (PAR), Field Training Officer (FTO), K-9 Officer, School Resource Officer (SRO), Motorcycle Enforcement Team, Hostage Negotiator, Traffic Accident Investigator, Persons Crimes Detective, General Investigations Detective, Economic Crimes Detective, Crimes Against Children Detective, Homicide Detective, Safe Streets Task Force, Special Weapons and Tactics (SWAT), Crisis Intervention Team (CIT), Emergency Response Team (ERT), Gang and Robbery Intervention Team (GRIT), Direct Action Response Team (DART), Fugitive Apprehension and Surveillance Team (FAST), among others.

== Misconduct ==
On 2 March 2015, An Aurora officer shot and killed Naeschylus Carter-Vinzant while trying to serve a warrant. He was unarmed. The matter was settled with a payment of over two and a half million dollars.

New reports indicate that on 29 June 2015, police arrested a pickpocket named Jeffery Gale. Seven Aurora officer handcuffed and hog-tied him. They then repeatedly attacked him with a Taser.

On 14 November 2015, Aurora police officers illegally arrested Dwight Crews after ordering him from his house. They had no warrant for his arrest. The matter was settled with a payment of $35,000.

On 22 December 2015, OyZhana Williams drove a man to the emergency room for treatment of a gunshot wound. There, several Aurora officers attacked her, slamming her head into the ground and stomping on her. The matter was settled with a payment of $335,000.

On 19 February 2016, Aurora police officers detained Darsean Kelly as he was near the scene of a crime. Although he did not resist the police, they attacked him with a Taser. The matter was settled out of court for $110,000.

On 16 March 2016, Aurora officers entered a coffee shop and approached Omar Hassan who was eating a muffin. With their hands on their guns they ordered out of the store telling him, "Your kind of business is not welcome here." The matter was settled for $40,000.

On 2 June 2016, in a case of mistaken identity, police entered a home without a warrant and handcuffed two men. The matter was settled with a payment of $150,000.

On 18 June 2017, Lt. Charles DeShazer was recorded using the racial slur "Alabama porch monkeys" to refer to black people. DeShazer was fired for his comments, but subsequently reinstated.

In March 2019, Officer Nate Meier was found in his uniform and official police vehicle asleep. A blood test showed five times the legal limit of alcohol. Aurora officers responding to the situation turned off their body cameras, failed to test a clear liquid found in a bottle in the car and did not collect evidence that could have been used in a criminal prosecution. After being demoted, Officer Meier remained on the job.

On 24 August 2019, responding to a call of a "suspicious person", the Aurora Police Department arrested Elijah McClain while he was walking home with groceries. McClain subsequently died as a result of police action during the arrest.

On 27 August 2019, Officer Levi Huffine hog-tied a black woman with her hands and ankles behind her back and ignored her cries for help for 20 minutes after she fell off the back seat of his cruiser in an inverted position, body camera imagery showed. Interim Police Chief Vanessa Wilson fired Huffine. Huffine appealed his firing, but the firing was upheld, at which point Huffine sued the Department in an attempt to get his job back.

In February 2020, an Aurora officer was fired for misconduct during an incident the preceding August. The interim police chief Vanessa Wilson announced the action to the press but refused to elaborate on what the officer might have done.

On 10 August 2020, Officer Robert Rosen responded to a King Soopers supermarket to assist another officer in arresting a man who was allegedly trespassing. When Rosen arrived on scene, he began to punch the suspect multiple times in the ribs and deployed his taser more than five times. The suspect was "passively resisting", laying on the floor covering his arms before Rosen arrived on scene. On 11 February 2021, police chief Vanessa Wilson fired Rosen for excessive use of force, unsatisfactory performance, misuse of a taser, and failure to operate a body-worn camera.

In July 2021, Officer John Haubert detained an unarmed man, pistol-whipped him at least seven times, and choked him for 39 seconds. Haubert also held his gun point blank against the man's head, later stating he would have shot him but wasn't sure if his gun was loaded. A second officer was standing nearby and did not intervene. Haubert was charged with felony second-degree assault, felony menacing, and two misdemeanors. The second officer was charged for not intervening against the use of force.

Press report in early February 2022 indicated that Doug Wilkinson, the head of the local police union was fired. This was the result of an investigation into an email sent to his members that pointed out that “to match the ‘diversity’ of ‘the community’ we could make sure to hire 10% illegal aliens, 50% weed smokers, 10% crackheads, and a few child molesters and murderers to round it out. You know, so we can make the department look like the ‘community.'”

== See also ==
- List of law enforcement agencies in Colorado
- 2012 Aurora, Colorado shooting
