= Denver Sheriff Department =

Criminal justice agency in Denver, Colorado

- Patch of Denver Sheriff Department since 1999

- Badge of Denver Sheriff Department since 2004
- Abbreviation: DSD
- Motto: Dedication, Service, Duty (DSD)

Agency overview
- Formed: December 2, 1902; 123 years ago

Jurisdictional structure
- Operations jurisdiction: Denver, Colorado, U.S.
- Jurisdiction of Denver Sheriff Department
- Area: 154.9 square miles (401 km^{2})
- Population: 663,862 (2014)
- Legal jurisdiction: City & County of Denver, City & County of Denver Courts, and Denver Detention Facilities
- Constituting instrument: City Charter, Article XX, Colorado Constitution
- General nature: Local civilian police

Operational structure
- Headquarters: 490 West Colfax Avenue, Denver, Colorado 80204
- Agency executive: Elias Diggins, Sheriff
- Parent agency: Denver Department of Safety; Executive Director of Safety Armando Saldate III

Website
- Denver Sheriff Department

The Denver Sheriff Department is a criminal justice agency based in Denver, Colorado, United States.

The DSD is composed of both uniformed and civilian employees. It is organized into three divisions with multiple units and sections, including jail operations at the Denver County Jail and the Downtown Detention Center, as well as the supervision of incarcerated individuals receiving care at the Denver Health Medical Center. The Denver Sheriff staff also operates the Vehicle Impound Facility, provides security at the County and District courts, transport prisoners across the state, including the extraditions of wanted persons from throughout the United States, serves as officers of the courts by providing for the process of service, including evictions, and has many specialty units such as the Criminal Investigations Unit, Fugitive Unit, Emergency Response Unit, Honor Guard, Mounted Posse, Gang Intelligence Unit and K9 Unit.

The department is overseen by the executive director of safety and the sheriff; both positions are appointed by the mayor. Denver's Sheriff is appointed by the Mayor of Denver; This is unique in Colorado, as all other county sheriffs are elected, although in the City & County of Broomfield, Colorado, the Chief of Police oversees the "sheriff function".

The Denver Sheriff Department is the largest Sheriff Department in the State of Colorado and as of September 2016, the agency employed more than 985 sworn and civilian members.

== History ==
The Denver Sheriff Department was established on December 2, 1902, at the same time as the City and County of Denver. The department was tasked with providing security in the courts, court related services and the county jail. Later duties were given to the department.

The current county jail opened in 1956 and has undergone many changes to the telephone pole construction with large cell houses to modern day direct supervision pods. Ninety percent of the original county jail has been razed to accommodate the new buildings.

One of the most famous duties of the department was the placement of Denver Boot, a non-destructive device that prevents a vehicle in with a parking violation from leaving by preventing one or more wheels from functioning. The "boot" was invented by Denverite Frank Marugg, who was a musician with the Denver Symphony Orchestra in 1953. The police had the detail at first, however was given to the sheriff departments Court Services Division. The duties of placing the boot on vehicles was given to Denver's Parking Management in the late 1980s.

In 1951, the City Jail was staffed by deputy sheriffs removing the police officers for street duties. Police commanders supervised deputy sheriffs until 1968 when command was fully given to sheriff officials. The City Jail was located on the 4th floor of the police headquarters located at 13th & Champa Sts. In 1978, a new police headquarters and city jail was opened at 13th & Cherokee Sts. The Pre Arraignment Detention Facility (PADF) served as the main booking facility until the new Downtown Detention Center opened. DDC is named after a Denver District Attorney (Phillip S. Van Cise) and Denver's longest serving undersheriff (Louis John Simonet). Simonet official title was Director of Corrections & Undersheriff and was the executive head of the department for eighteen years. In 2013, the title of sheriff was given to the executive head of the department. Denver does not have a statutory undersheriff as in other counties. The 2013 shake up called for the Manager of Safety/Ex Officio Sheriff to become the executive director of Public Safety, thus no longer being the "sheriff" of Denver. The Director still oversees the operation of the fire, police and sheriff departments.

=== Misconduct ===
In July 2010, suspect Marvin Louis Booker was tackled by five sheriff's deputies, put in a headlock, handcuffed, and then tased. Shortly after, he went into cardio-respiratory arrest and died. The City and County of Denver did not bring criminal charges against the officers. However, in a civil trial in 2014, the officers were found liable, and the Booker family was awarded $4.65 million in damages.

In October 2012, Deputy Bruce Mitchell released Elvie Bellamy, an inmate who was supposed to be transferred to another facility. Deputy Bruce Mitchell, himself and another jail officer (not sheriff), then left their stations and took a personal unmarked vehicle to look for Mr. Bellamy. They did not notify the police or other agencies, instead attempting to recapture the prisoner themselves. They arrested, then released, another man who resembled Bellamy. This was the third time Deputy Mitchell had mistakenly released a prisoner. He was suspended for four weeks.

In December 2013, a report by Nicholas Mitchell, Denver's independent monitor, indicated that the department had not been investigating all allegations of prisoner abuse at the jail, as required by law. The report also indicated that the jail staff used tasers on uncooperative prisoners.

In January 2014, Deputy Matthew Andrews was sentenced to six years in prison for helping a prisoner escape from jail. Andrews allowed the prisoner to wear his uniform to leave the facility.

In February 2014, Deputy Brady Lovingier was suspended for thirty days after an unprovoked attack on a heavily restrained prisoner two years earlier. The attack took place in front of a judge, in a courtroom, and was recorded on video. Lovingier, the son of the previous sheriff, appealed his suspension. While awaiting a decision on his appeal, Lovingier was assigned to train other deputies on the use of force. In an official statement, Sheriff Gary Wilson said he did not know Lovingier was teaching the class.

In late July 2014, Sheriff Wilson resigned under pressure from the mayor to end abuse at the jail. In 2018, Wilson left the department to pursue a real estate career.

In August 2019, Diana Sanchez filed a lawsuit in U.S. District Court claiming that she was forced to give birth to her son alone in her cell without medical supervision or treatment, despite repeatedly telling the jail's staff that she was having contractions. Her suit alleges that instead of “ensuring that Ms. Sanchez was able to give birth in a safe and sanitary medical setting,” nurses and deputies “callously made her labor alone for hours,” forcing her to endure a “horrific experience”. Moments after the baby's birth, a male nurse is seen on camera walking into the cell and taking the baby boy away. It was reported that he had been watching the incident from outside the cell instead of providing help during the child birth.

== Achievements ==
Denver Deputy Sheriffs have been involved in security details for World Youth Day 1993, the 1997 G-8 Summit, and the 2008 Democratic National Convention.

On November 20, 2013, the National Sheriffs' Association presented the Triple Crown Award to the Denver Sheriff Department, making it one of only 35 sheriff's departments to receive the award since it was established in 1993. The Triple Crown Award recognizes sheriff's offices that achieve simultaneous accreditation from the Commission on Accreditation for Law Enforcement Agencies, the American Correctional Association, and the National Commission on Correctional Health Care.

== See also ==
- List of law enforcement agencies in Colorado
