= Colorado Department of Public Safety =

Department of the Colorado state government

- Flag
- Abbreviation: CO DPS

Agency overview
- Employees: 1,846
- Annual budget: US$$512,916,940 [FY 2019]

Jurisdictional structure
- Operations jurisdiction: Colorado, USA
- Area: 269,837 square miles (698,870 km^{2})
- Population: 5,695,564 (2018 est)
- General nature: Civilian police

Operational structure
- Headquarters: Denver Colorado
- Governor of Colorado responsible: Jared Polis
- Agency executives: Stan Hilkey, Executive Director; Jana Locke, Deputy Director
- Parent agency: State of Colorado

Website
- publicsafety.colorado.gov

The Colorado Department of Public Safety (CDPS) consists of five divisions that cover a breadth of safety programs and services: Colorado Bureau of Investigation (CBI), Colorado State Patrol, Colorado Division of Criminal Justice (DCJ), Colorado Division of Fire Prevention & Control (DFPC), and Colorado Division of Homeland Security and Emergency Management (DHSEM). Additionally, the Executive Director's Office supports operations of the five divisions and houses the Colorado School Safety Resource Center (CSSRC) and Colorado Integrated Criminal Justice Information Systems (CJIS)

Colorado's local law enforcement, emergency management, fire, and criminal justice agencies operate with home-rule authority; while local jurisdictions often partner with and work closely with CDPS agencies, they are not overseen by the Department of Public Safety. When someone has a question or concern about municipal or county safety services, they may need to contact your local jurisdiction.

== Structure ==
CDPS includes the:

Agency	Responsibilities
Colorado State Patrol	Enforces traffic laws on state highways, guards the state capitol, and guards the Governor.
Colorado Bureau of Investigation	Supports and assists local, county, and state criminal justice agencies through the provision of professional investigative and forensic laboratory services. Manages and administers criminal justice records and data sharing.
Division of Criminal Justice	Provides assistance to state and local criminal justice agencies through grants, research, and policy development.
Division of Fire Prevention and Control	Administers fire prevention and code enforcement, wildfire preparedness, response, and management, and the training and certification of firefighters.
Division of Homeland Security and Emergency Management	Works to prevent, protect, mitigate, respond and recover from all-hazard events including acts of terrorism.
