= Cannabis policy of the Ford administration =

During the administration of American President Gerald Ford (1974–1977), the president moderated the strict anti-cannabis stance of his predecessor, resigned president Richard Nixon, though this did not result in any significant weakening of federal cannabis policy. In contrast with Nixon's harsh policies, Ford advocated instead reducing the harms associated with drug use. Ford struck a more conciliatory tone, identifying drug users as victims of traffickers, rather than criminals.

== Presidency ==
Ford retained White House "Drug Czar" Robert DuPont, originally appointed by Nixon. Unlike Nixon, Ford did not support the formation of an office of drug policy, however in 1976 he did not veto the amendment to create the Office of Drug Abuse Policy, though he failed to staff the office.

In 1975, Ford was questioned about his stance regarding decriminalization of cannabis, replying:

I do not believe we have sufficient evidence at the present time to warrant any recommendation in that regard... I have read summaries of a number of studies in this area, and there is no consensus. And therefore, until more information is available, I would not make any such recommendation.

== 1976 campaign ==
While running against Jimmy Carter in the 1975 presidential election, Ford took a harder line against cannabis use, rejecting the findings of the 1975 The White Paper on Drug Abuse. Following his loss to Carter, in his remaining lame duck presidency, Ford again modified his position, and supported the White Paper's position that more dangerous drugs should be combated while cannabis use should be a lower enforcement priority.

== Personal life ==
In his own family life, Ford confronted issues of drug use, particularly that of his wife Betty Ford who was later hospitalized for addiction to alcohol and opiates. In a 1975 interview, Betty Ford said of her children "I'm sure they've all tried marijuana," which was confirmed in October 1975 when Jack Ford publicly stated that he had tried marijuana, and downplayed any concerns regarding the drug. In response, Gerald Ford stated that while he did not approve of cannabis use, it was a "very honorable thing" for Jack to admit to its use, despite it being "not a healthy thing to have."
