= James W. Carroll =

American attorney

Jim Carroll
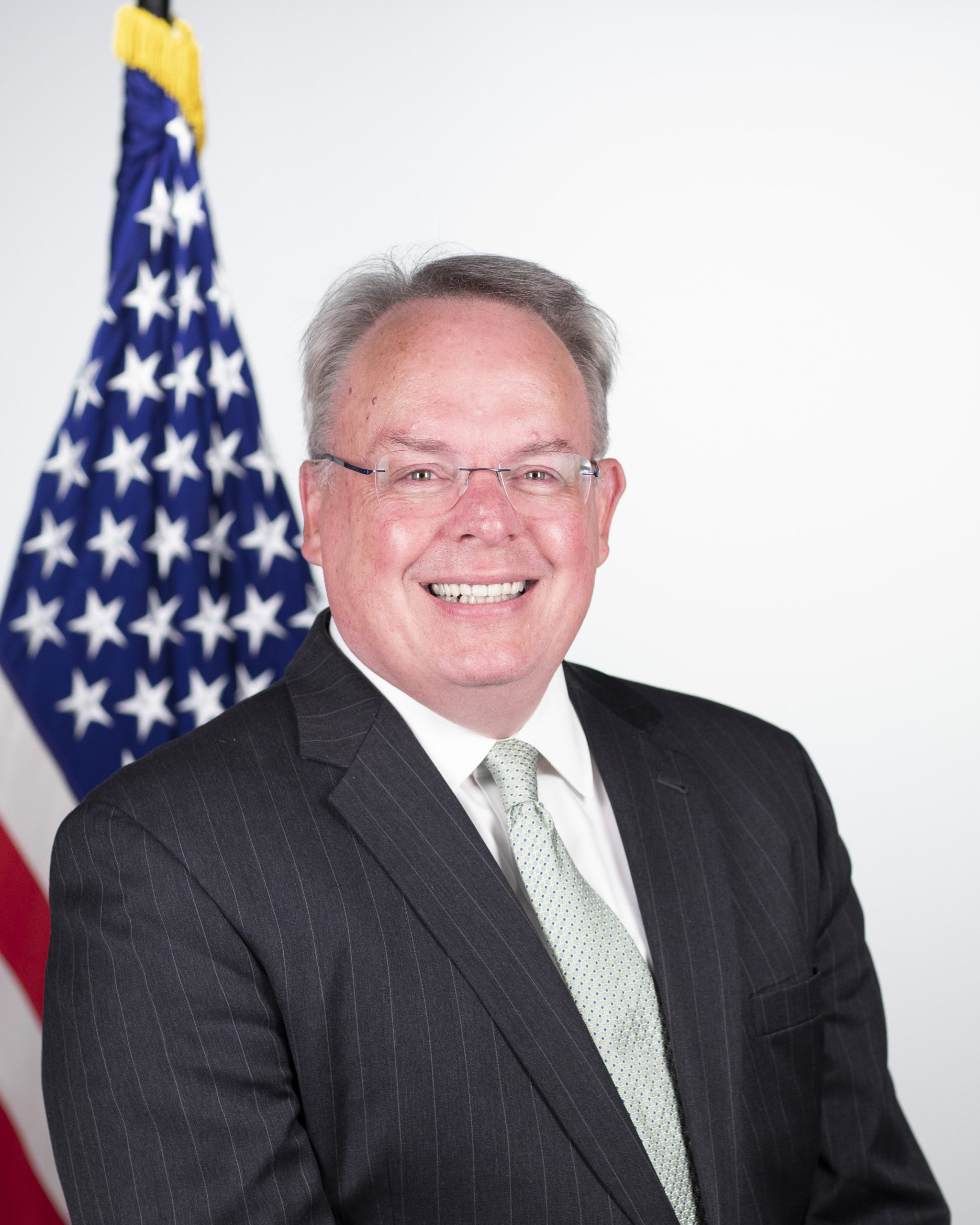
- Official portrait, 2020

Director of the Office of National Drug Control Policy
- In office February 9, 2018 – January 20, 2021; Acting: February 9, 2018 – January 3, 2019
- President: Donald Trump
- Preceded by: Michael Botticelli
- Succeeded by: Rahul Gupta

White House Principal Deputy Chief of Staff
- In office December 6, 2017 – February 9, 2018
- President: Donald Trump
- Preceded by: Kirstjen Nielsen
- Succeeded by: Zachary Fuentes

Personal details
- Party: Republican
- Education: University of Virginia (BA); George Mason University (JD)

James William Carroll Jr. is an American attorney and government appointee, who served as director of the Office of National Drug Control Policy in the Trump Administration from February 9, 2018 until January 20, 2021.

== Education ==
Carroll received his B.A. from the University of Virginia and his J.D. degree from George Mason University.

== Career ==
General Counsel in the Office of Management and Budget, and an attorney in the Office of the White House Counsel for Presidents Donald Trump and George W. Bush. He later served as the White House Deputy Chief of Staff.

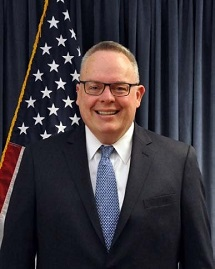
Photo of Carroll

He was confirmed by the U.S. Senate as Office of National Drug Control Policy on January 2, 2019. Carroll was sworn into office by Vice President Mike Pence on January 31.

In 2021, Carroll compared fentanyl to weapons of mass destruction.

Political offices
Preceded by Rich Baum; Acting	Director of the Office of National Drug Control Policy; 2018–2021; Acting: 2018–2019	Succeeded by Regina LaBelle; Acting
