= Diego Garcia black site =

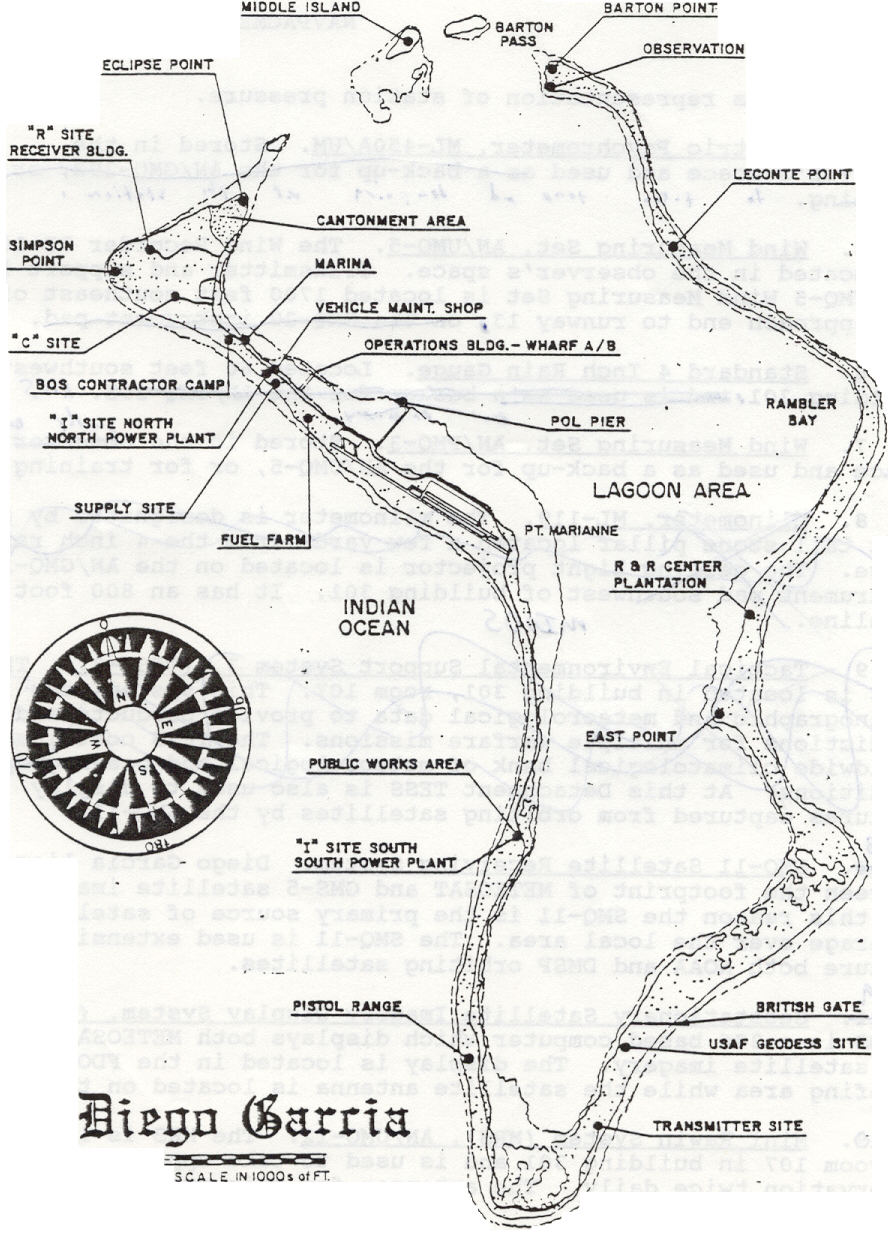
A map of military installations on Diego Garcia in 2002

In 2008 it was exposed in TIME magazine by Lawrence Wilkerson that a secret war on terror prison had existed on the island of Diego Garcia from 2002 to 2006. He claimed that Diego Garcia was used by the CIA for "nefarious activities". He said that he had heard from three US intelligence sources that Diego Garcia was used as "a transit site where people were temporarily housed, let us say, and interrogated from time to time" and, "What I heard was more along the lines of using it as a transit location when perhaps other places were full or other places were deemed too dangerous or insecure, or unavailable at the moment".

In June 2004, the British Foreign Secretary Jack Straw stated that United States authorities had repeatedly assured him that no detainees had passed in transit through Diego Garcia or were disembarked there.

Diego Garcia was first rumoured to have been one of the locations of the CIA's black sites in 2005. Khalid Sheikh Mohammed is one of the "high-value detainees" suspected to have been held in Diego Garcia. In October 2007, the Foreign Affairs Select Committee of the British Parliament announced that it would launch an investigation of continued allegations of a prison camp on Diego Garcia, which it claimed were twice confirmed by comments made by retired United States Army General Barry McCaffrey. On 31 July 2008, an unnamed former White House official alleged that the United States had imprisoned and interrogated at least one suspect on Diego Garcia during 2002 and possibly 2003.

The existence of the site was confirmed by US general Barry McCaffrey, and Swiss Senator Dick Marty. Also, Manfred Nowak, one of five of the United Nations Special Rapporteurs on Torture, says that credible evidence exists supporting allegations that ships serving as black sites have used Diego Garcia as a base. The human rights group Reprieve alleges that United States-operated ships moored outside the territorial waters of Diego Garcia were used to incarcerate and torture detainees.

Inmates included Mustafa Setmariam Nasar, and Riduan Isamuddin was held there before being transferred to Guantanamo Bay detention camp. The United Kingdom's government, who leased the island to the US, denied any knowledge of the incident, saying that two prisoners had passed through Diego Garcia but the plane they were on had only stopped to refuel. Nasar's location is still unknown since his arrival on Diego Garcia was announced in Spanish newspaper El País.

On December 9, 2014, the United States Senate Intelligence Committee published a 600-page unclassified summary of its 6,700 page secret report on the CIA's abuse of its secret prisoners.
