= Sara Carter (journalist) =

American journalist and politician (born c.1981)

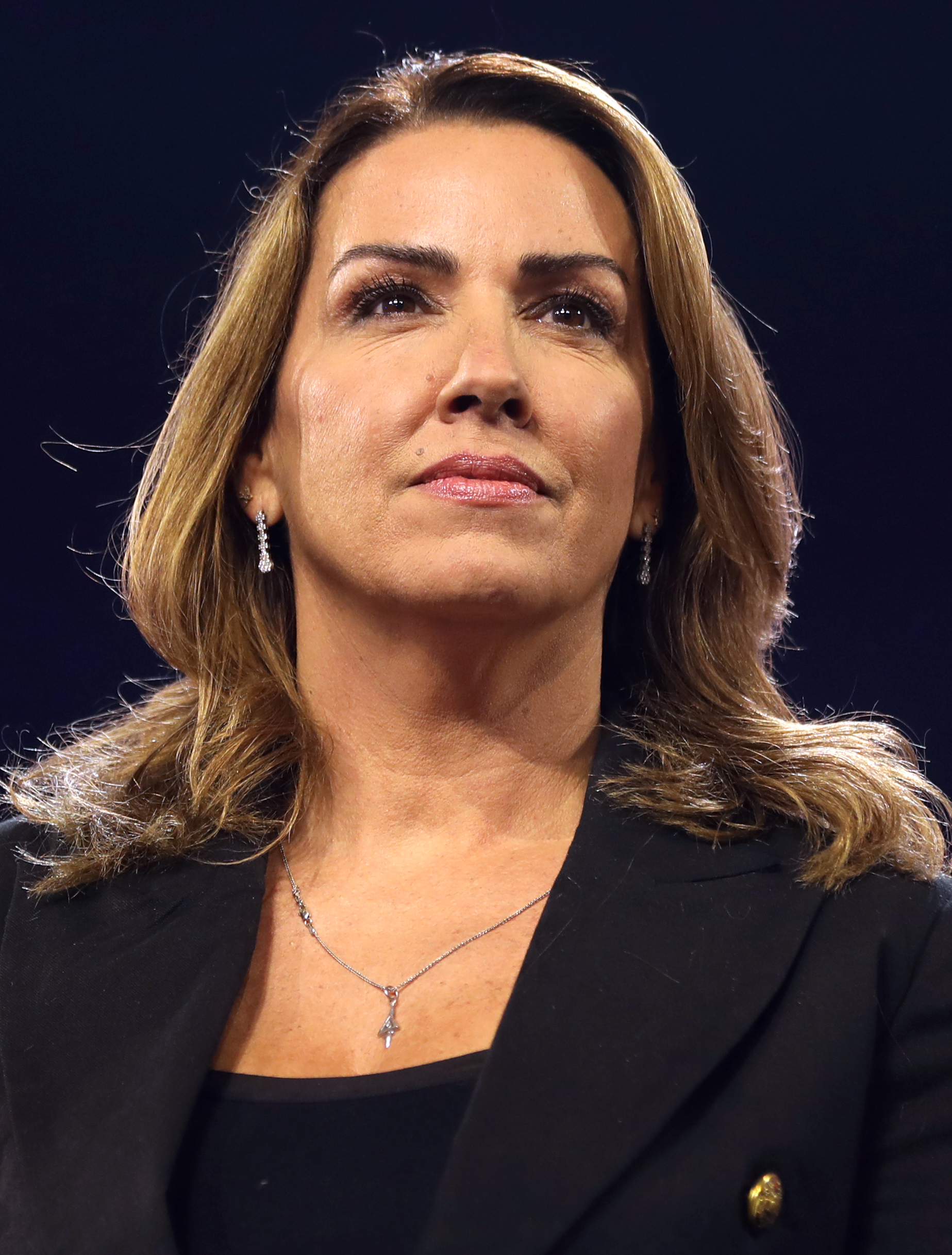
- Carter in 2023

Director of the Office of National Drug Control Policy
- Incumbent
- Assumed office January 9, 2026
- President: Donald Trump
- Preceded by: Jon Rice (acting)

Personal details
- Born: c. 1981 (age 44–45) La Verne, California, U.S.
- Party: Republican
- Education: California State Polytechnic University, Pomona (BA)
- Website: Official website

Sara A. Carter Bailey (née Carter; born c. 1981) is an American journalist and politician. She has served as the director of the Office of National Drug Control Policy (or "drug czarina") since January 2026. Previously, she was a Fox News contributor.

== Career ==
Carter is an investigative journalist. She is a former contributor to Fox News, having hosted The Sara Carter Show, a podcast owned by Fox. According to her LinkedIn profile, she has also worked for Circa News, the Washington Examiner, and The Washington Times, among other publications. Also according to her LinkedIn, she is a two-time recipient of the National Headliner Award.

On March 28, 2025, Donald Trump announced via Truth Social that Carter would be the next director of the Office of National Drug Control Policy. She had held no public office prior to the appointment, nor does she hold work experience in drug policy, health, or law enforcement. During her confirmation hearing, she was questioned by Democratic Congress members about her qualifications. She was confirmed by the U.S. Senate on January 6, 2026 in a 52–48 vote.

In May 2026, Carter published the 2026 National Drug Control Strategy, which outlines how the White House might "defeat the scourge of illicit drugs."

== Personal life ==
Born c. 1981, in La Verne, California, Carter was raised in Saudi Arabia. Her mother is a Cuban immigrant and her father is a veteran in the United States Marine Corps. She studied journalism and communications at California State Polytechnic University, Pomona.

Carter is fluent in Spanish, according to her LinkedIn profile. She is married to Marty Bailey, a former member of the United States Army Special Forces, who was blinded in the War in Afghanistan; they reportedly have six children together. As of 2025, she resides in Texas.

Political offices
Preceded by Jon Rice; Acting	Director of the Office of National Drug Control Policy; 2026–present	Incumbent
