= John P. Walters =

Former US government official (born 1952)

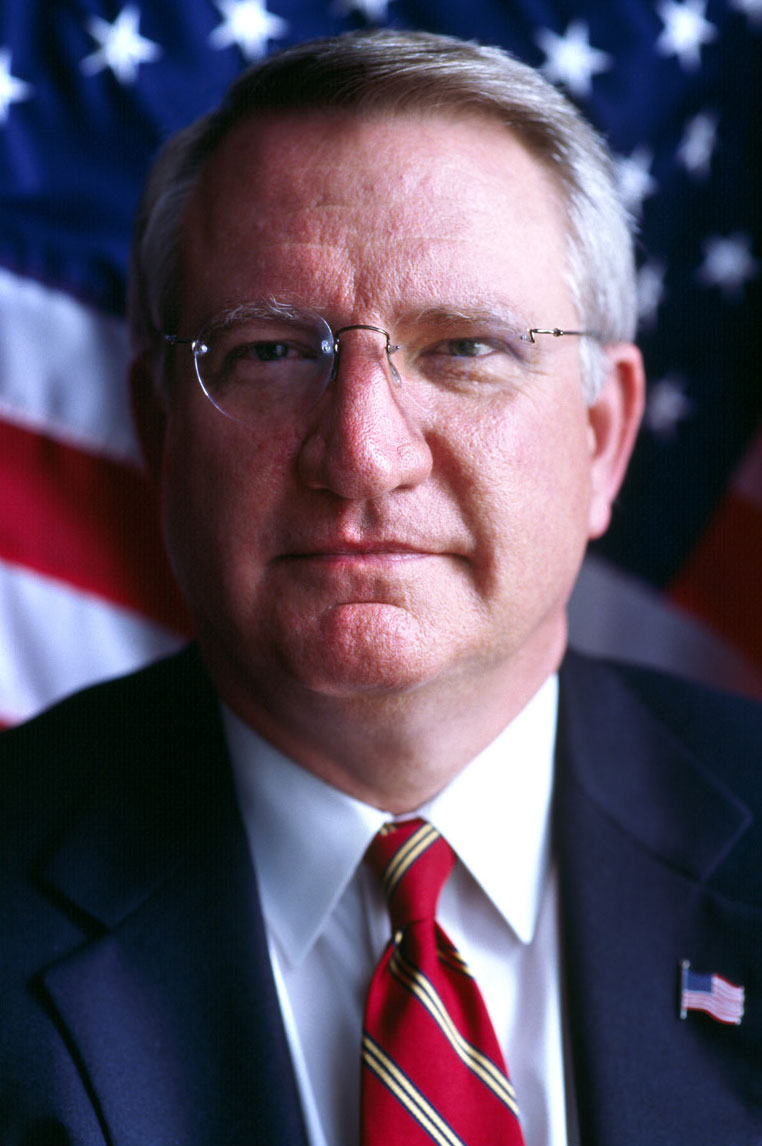

Director of the Office of National Drug Control Policy
- In office December 7, 2001 – January 20, 2009
- President: George W. Bush
- Preceded by: Barry McCaffrey
- Succeeded by: Gil Kerlikowske
- Acting; January 20, 1993 – July 19, 1993
- President: Bill Clinton
- Preceded by: Bob Martinez
- Succeeded by: Lee Brown

Personal details
- Born: February 8, 1952 (age 74)
- Party: Republican
- Education: Michigan State University (BA); University of Toronto (MA)

John P. Walters (born February 8, 1952) is the president and chief executive officer of the Hudson Institute; he was appointed in January 2021. He joined Hudson in 2009 as the executive vice president and most recently was the chief operating officer. Previously, Walters was Director of the White House Office of National Drug Control Policy (ONDCP) in the George W. Bush administration. He held that position from February 5, 2001, to January 20, 2009. As the U.S. "Drug Czar", Walters coordinated all aspects of federal anti-drug policies and spending. As drug czar, he was a staunch opponent of drug decriminalization, legalization, and medical marijuana.

== Background ==
He was Assistant to the Secretary at the U.S. Department of Education in the Reagan Administration. He was the Secretary's representative to the National Drug Policy Board and the Domestic Policy Council's Health Policy Working Group. From 1989 to 1991, Walters was chief of staff for William Bennett and was Deputy Director for Supply Reduction from 1991 until leaving the office in 1993.

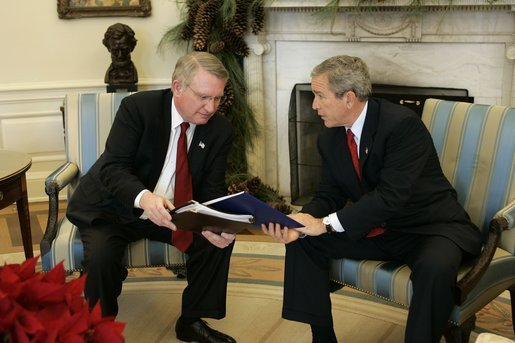
John Walters meets with President George W. Bush in 2004

Walters served as Acting Assistant Director and Program Officer in the Division of Education Programs at the National Endowment for the Humanities from 1982 to 1985. He has previously taught political science at Michigan State University's James Madison College and at Boston College. From 1996 until 2001 he served as president of the Philanthropy Roundtable.

He holds a BA from Michigan State University's James Madison College and a MA from the University of Toronto.

On April 7, 2023, Walters was sanctioned by the Chinese government after Taiwanese President Tsai Ing-wen gave a speech at the Hudson Institute.

== Policy views ==
Walters is opposed to the decriminalization and legalization of narcotics. Speaking of marijuana legalization in Colorado, he said, "My argument is look to Colorado: it’s getting worse. That’s exactly what they said they were going to do. Tax it; regulate it; we’re going to keep it away from kids; higher rate. I visited people shortly after the legalization in Denver. I was struck by a woman who said, 'I’m terrified for my children. We now are told our children cannot bring food or beverages to school.' Anything they consume in the school must be made under school supervision because, of course, you have brownies, fruit juices, candies, other kinds of things that are infused with cannabis or THC and can be used to poison these children."

Walters is a supporter of drug rehabilitation in place of incarceration to help drug users. In an interview, he said, "When I was in office, the criminal-justice system was the single largest category of institutions referring people to treatment using drug courts and diversion programs. Don’t send them to prison. Let’s get them into treatment because that’s what’s really causing their lives to be so self-destructive to themselves and to others. And it was that law and it was that effort."

Political offices
Preceded by Bob Martinez	Director of the Office of National Drug Control Policy; Acting; 1993	Succeeded by Lee Brown
Preceded by Ed Jurith; Acting	Director of the Office of National Drug Control Policy; 2001–2009	Succeeded by Ed Jurith; Acting
