= Michael Botticelli =

American public health official

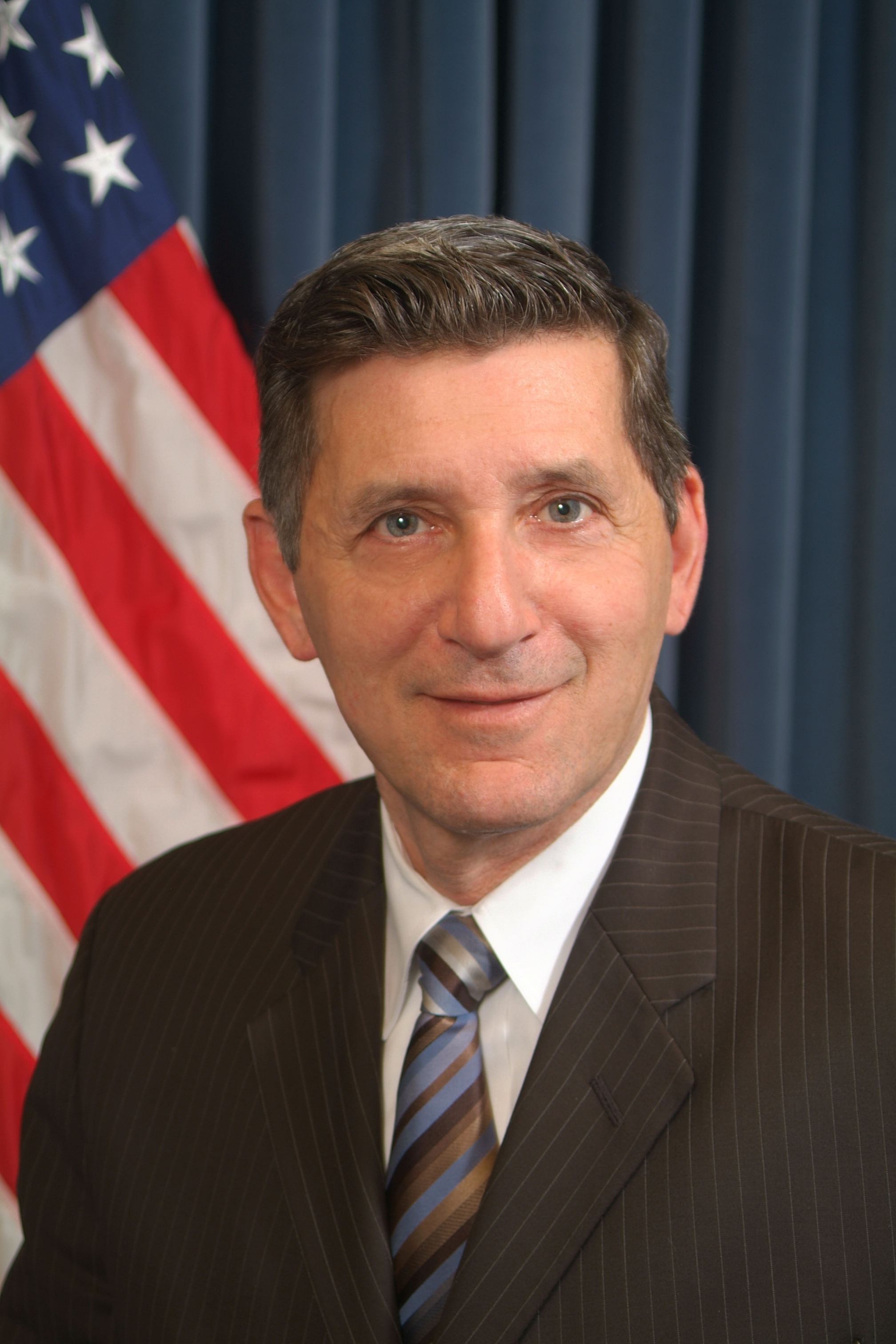

Director of the Office of National Drug Control Policy
- In office March 7, 2014 – January 20, 2017; Acting: March 7, 2014 – February 11, 2015
- President: Barack Obama
- Preceded by: Gil Kerlikowske
- Succeeded by: James W. Carroll

Personal details
- Born: January 2, 1958 (age 68) Troy, New York, U.S.
- Party: Democratic
- Spouse: David Wells
- Education: Siena College (BS); St. Lawrence University (MEd)

Michael P. Botticelli (born January 2, 1958) is an American public health official who served as the director of the White House Office of National Drug Control Policy (ONDCP) from March 2014 until the end of President Obama's term. He was named acting director after the resignation of Gil Kerlikowske, and received confirmation from the United States Senate in February 2015. Prior to joining ONDCP, he worked in the Massachusetts Department of Public Health. Following completion of his service as ONDCP Director, he became the executive director of the Grayken Center for Addiction Medicine at the Boston Medical Center.

== Early life and education ==
Botticelli was born in Troy, New York and raised in Waterford, New York. He attended Catholic Central High School. He later received a Bachelor's degree in psychology from Siena College and a Masters in Education from St. Lawrence University.

Botticelli began drinking alcohol regularly in his junior year of high school. By his 20s, he was an alcoholic. He also experimented with cocaine and marijuana. He was arrested for driving under the influence following a traffic collision on the Massachusetts Turnpike in 1988. A judge gave him the option of going into treatment or being sentenced to prison, and he chose to enter treatment.

== Career ==
After achieving sobriety, Botticelli joined the Massachusetts Department of Public Health, in 1994. He worked as a coordinator for alcoholism programs from 1994 through 1995, as contract manager for HIV-related policies and services from 1995 through 1996, as an assistant director for policy and planning from 1996 through 2000, as the chief of staff to the public health commissioner from 2000 through 2003, and as director of substance abuse services from 2003 to 2012. In the latter role, he oversaw the pilot program for Quincy, Massachusetts, police to begin carrying naloxone to treat opioid overdose, and the expansion of substance abuse treatment services in community health centers.

Gil Kerlikowske, serving as the director of the Office of National Drug Control Policy (ONDCP) under President Barack Obama, met Botticelli on a visit to Massachusetts and asked him to serve as deputy director. In March 2014, following Kerlikowske's confirmation as commissioner of U.S. Customs and Border Protection, Botticelli became acting director. He is the first director of the ONDCP to be in recovery for substance use. The United States Senate confirmed Botticelli in February 2015 by a vote of 92–0. As director of ONDCP, Botticelli has advocated to expand the usage of naloxone, improved education for providers around prescription painkillers and providing clean syringes for injection drug users to limit the spread of HIV and Hepatitis C. Botticelli criticized the nation's previous approach to dealing with drug issues stating that "We can't arrest and incarcerate addiction out of people". He believes the focus should be on treatment rather than incarceration. He does, however, oppose free marijuana for its effects, for the publicity similar to tobacco it might get and for the dependency the states might get on its taxes.

Following the end of the Obama administration, the Grayken Center for Addiction Medicine at the Boston Medical Center named Botticelli its executive director.

Botticelli is a member of the National Association of State Alcohol and Drug Abuse Directors. He has been an advisory committee member of the Center for Substance Abuse Prevention and the National Action Alliance for Suicide Prevention.

== Honors and awards ==
*ASAM Public Policy Award (2015)

- Ramstad/Kennedy National Award for Outstanding Leadership in Promoting Addiction Recovery (2008)
- National Association of State Alcohol and Drug Abuse Directors Service Award (2012)

== Personal life ==
Botticelli and his husband, David Wells, were married in 2009.

Political offices
Preceded by Gil Kerlikowske	Director of the Office of National Drug Control Policy; 2014–2017	Succeeded by James W. Carroll
