= Gil Kerlikowske =

American government official (born 1949)

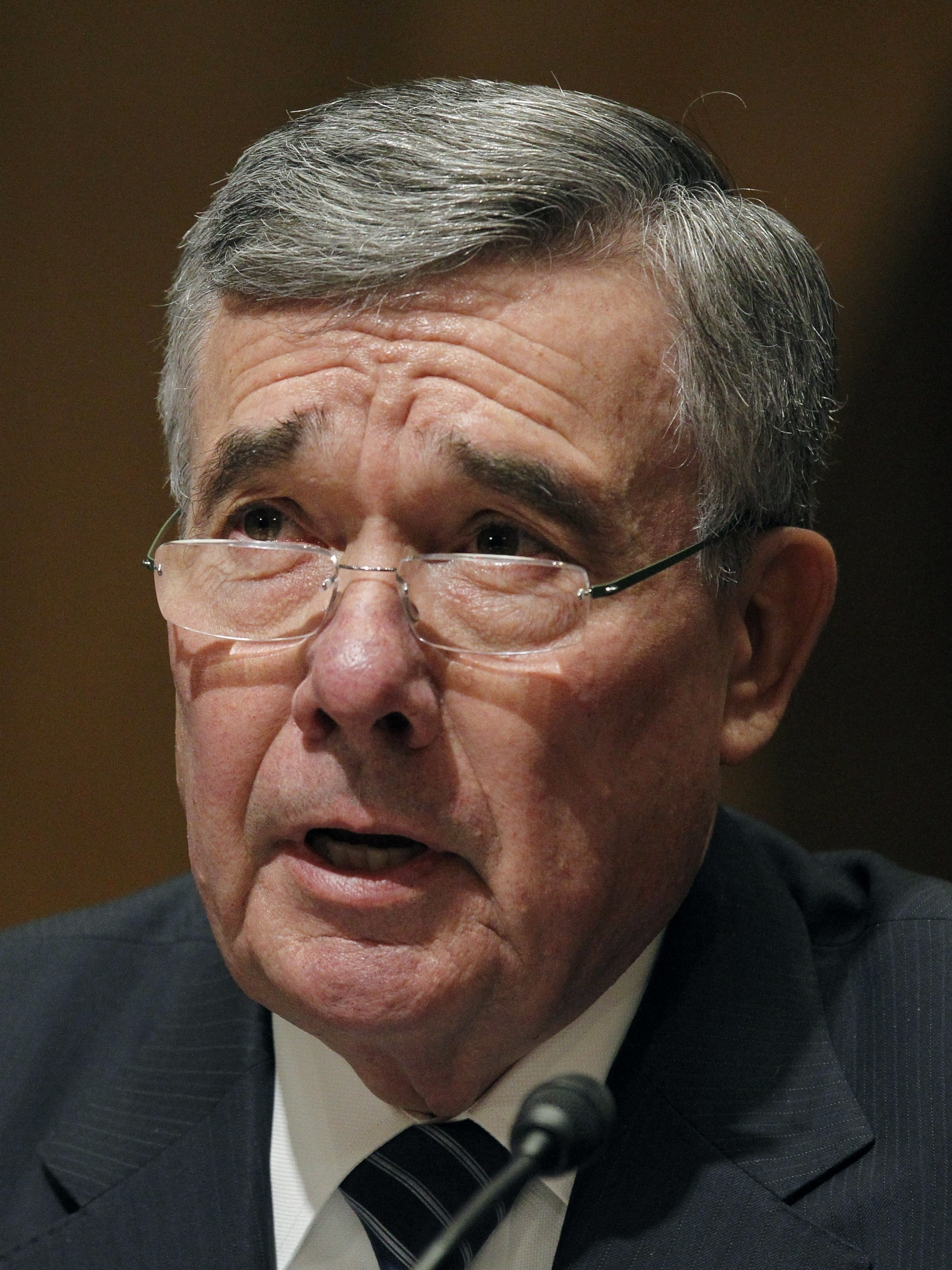

Commissioner of U.S. Customs and Border Protection
- In office March 7, 2014 – January 20, 2017
- President: Barack Obama
- Preceded by: Thomas S. Winkowski (acting)
- Succeeded by: Kevin McAleenan

Director of the Office of National Drug Control Policy
- In office May 7, 2009 – March 7, 2014
- President: Barack Obama
- Preceded by: Ed Jurith (acting)
- Succeeded by: Michael Botticelli

Personal details
- Born: Richard Gil Kerlikowske; November 23, 1949 (age 76) Fort Myers, Florida, U.S.
- Party: Democratic
- Spouse: Anna Lazlo
- Education: University of South Florida (BA, MA)

Military service
- Allegiance: United States
- Branch/service: United States Army
- Years of service: 1970–1972

Richard Gil Kerlikowske (born November 23, 1949) is a former Commissioner of U.S. Customs and Border Protection. He assumed office on March 6, 2014 and retired January 20, 2017. He also served as the Director of the Office of National Drug Control Policy between 2009 and 2014.

Kerlikowske graduated from the University of South Florida in Tampa and the Executive Institute at the Federal Bureau of Investigation Academy. He has served as Chief of Police in four cities and worked in the United States Justice Department. His longest term as a Chief of Police was between July 2001 and March 2009 in Seattle, Washington. He faced scrutiny in Seattle for the department's tactics during civil unrest. In 2017, he was an IOP Fellow at Harvard Kennedy School of Government. He is currently a distinguished visiting fellow and professor of the Practice in Criminology and Criminal Justice at Northeastern University.

== Early life and education ==
Kerlikowske was raised in southern Florida by his mother and stepfather.

Kerlikowske graduated from Fort Myers High School in 1968. He holds a B.A. and M.A. in criminal justice from the University of South Florida in Tampa. The school also gave him an honorary doctorate. He is a graduate of the National Executive Institute at the Federal Bureau of Investigation's Academy in Quantico, Virginia.

== Career ==
Kerlikowske was drafted into the United States Army served from 1970 to 1972 in the military police, and was stationed in Washington, D.C. Part of his responsibility was saluting then-President Richard Nixon as he boarded the presidential helicopter and he was awarded the Presidential Service Badge. He began his law enforcement career in 1972 as a police officer for the St. Petersburg Police in Florida. He served as Chief of Police in Fort Pierce, Florida and Port St. Lucie, Florida. He later served as police commissioner for Buffalo, New York for about a year and a half.

He served as a member of the United States Justice Department, where he oversaw community policing grants. His work in Washington D.C. earned praise from then-Attorney General Janet Reno and then-First Lady Hillary Clinton.

=== Seattle Police Department ===
Kerlikowske joined the Seattle Police Department in 2000. Mayor Paul Schell chose him as Seattle's new police chief in July 2001.

Kerlikowske oversaw the demonstrations marking the second anniversary of the controversial WTO conference in Seattle which had caused his predecessor, Norm Stamper, to resign. Although the event was peaceful throughout the day, 140 were arrested after police issued orders to disperse in the evening. Some of those arrested were prominent labor leaders attempting to move the event to the Labor Temple and others who were caught in the arrest zone while leaving work. Some charges were later dismissed. The police department was later criticized by the American Civil Liberties Union for the handling of protests against the Iraq War and previous demonstrations in a 2003 letter to the mayor and Kerlikowske.

Kerlikowske faced criticism over the department's slow response to the 2001 Seattle Mardi Gras Riots that left one man dead and 70 people with injuries. During the incident, he ordered the police at the scene not to intervene, instead maintaining a perimeter around the violence. The City of Seattle acknowledged police strategy presented a public safety threat, and settled with the murder victim's family for just under $2 million. The next month, The Seattle Police Officers' Guild voted no confidence in the chief, citing both the Mardi Gras riot and his public reprimand of an officer for being rude to a group of alleged jaywalkers.

In 2003, a ballot measure passed in Seattle that directs the police department to consider marijuana possession (for adult personal use) the City's lowest law enforcement priority. Kerlikowske opposed the ballot initiative, but said such arrests were already a low priority.

2003 was the first time in 15 years that Seattle did not have any shooting deaths involving officers. Kerlikowske said Tasers and other less-lethal tools were partly responsible. In September 2004, the local NAACP president asked to be Tased to better understand the complaints his organization had received. Kerlikowske joined him in a public demonstration in which they were both shocked at the same time.

In 2005, Kerlikowske faced embarrassment after having his duty handgun stolen from his locked car, which was parked on a public street.

In March 2007, the National Association for the Advancement of Colored People and the Minority Executive Directors Coalition called for his resignation. Seattle had just settled a lawsuit filed by a suspect who alleged that the police had used excessive force in a 2005 arrest. The department’s Office of Professional Accountability (OPA) recommended discipline for the three officers involved but action was not taken. The call for his resignation was also due to criticism of his alleged intervention in the internal investigation of two officers accused of violating the civil rights of a drug dealer during an arrest in January. The suspect claimed the officers roughed him up which was supported by video footage of the incident. The OPA Review Board accused him of taking extraordinary measures to protect the officers. The complaint was referred to the FBI, U.S. Attorney's district office, and Civil Rights Division of the U.S. Department of Justice for further investigation.

=== Director of the ONDCP ===
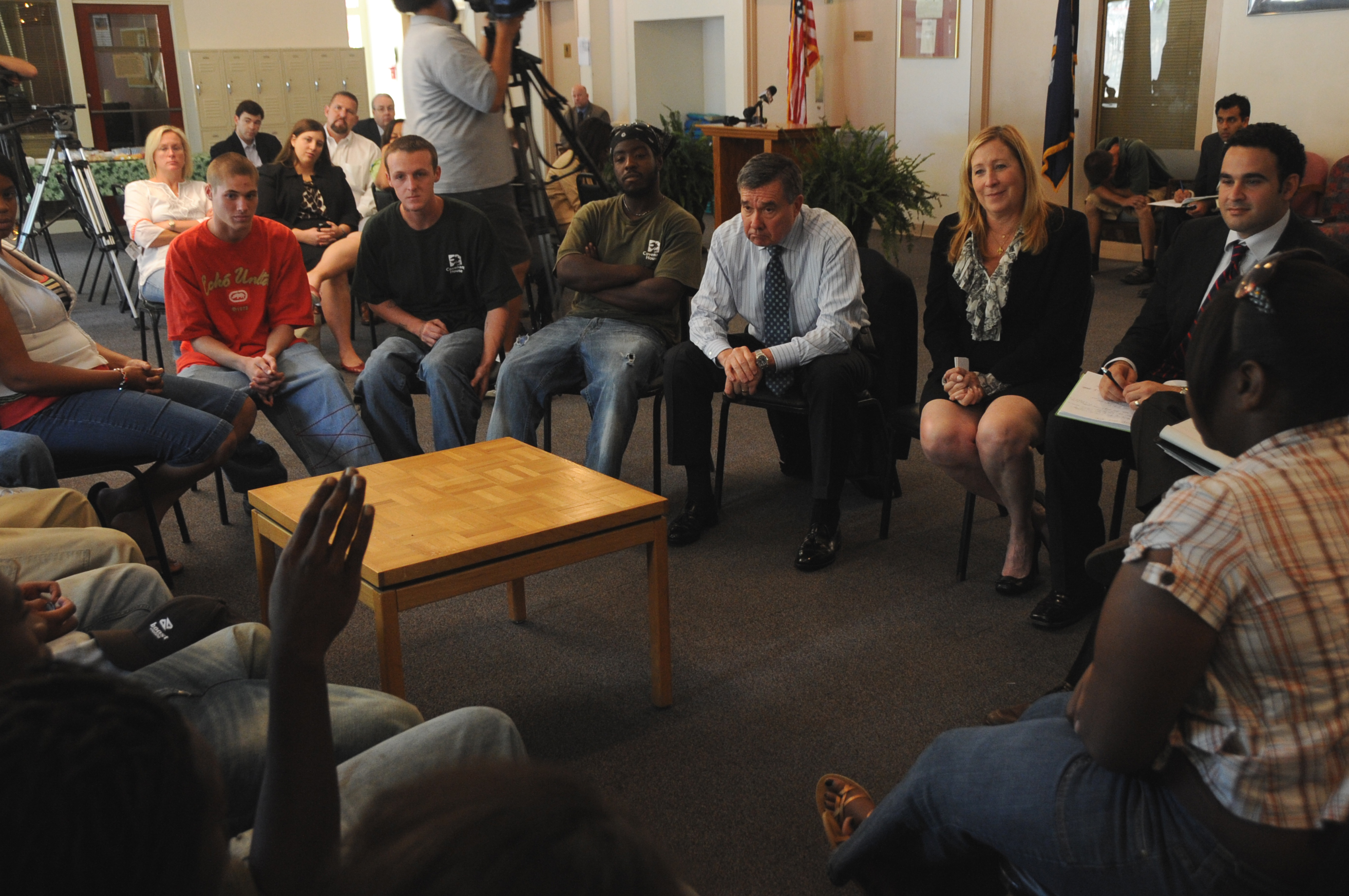
Drug Czar Gil Kerlikowske speaks with staff and patients at the Covenant House, which helps drug-addicted teenagers and adults.

On February 11, 2009, it was reported that Kerlikowske had accepted an offer by President Barack Obama to become Director of the Office of National Drug Control Policy, succeeding John P. Walters. The Drug Policy Alliance issued a statement after the announcement of his nomination saying: "We're cautiously optimistic that Seattle Police Chief Gil Kerlikowske will support Obama's drug policy reform agenda". He assumed the office on May 7, 2009.

On May 13, 2009, Kerlikowske signaled that the Obama Administration would no longer use the term "war on drugs", as it is counter-productive. The Obama Administration would instead demonstrate a favoring of treatment over incarceration in trying to reduce drug use.

In a May 22, 2009 interview on KUOW radio, he said any drug 'legalization' would be "waving the white flag" and that "legalization is off the charts when it comes to discussion, from my viewpoint" and that "legalization vocabulary doesn't exist for me and it was made clear that it doesn't exist in President Obama's vocabulary." Specifically about marijuana, he said, "It's a dangerous drug" and about the medical use of marijuana, he said, "we will wait for evidence on whether smoked marijuana has any medicinal benefits – those aren't in."

Shortly before the vote on 2010 California Proposition 19, in October 2010, he said the federal government might sue the state of California if it legalized marijuana.

On November 2, 2010, the state of California voted on Proposition 19, which entailed legalizing marijuana for personal uses, growing or cultivating it, as well as sale and taxation of it. The Proposition lost by 500,000 votes out of the near 7 million votes cast. "Californians recognized that legalizing marijuana will not make our citizens healthier, solve California's budget crisis or reduce drug related violence in Mexico," said Gil Kerlikowske.

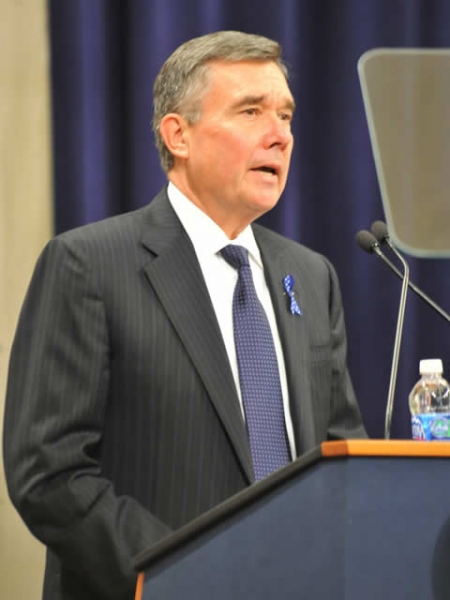
Kerlikowske speaks as Director of the Office of National Drug Control Policy in 2011.

In a December 9, 2010 interview with The Nation magazine, Kerlikowske called Nancy Reagan's "Just Say No" campaign one of the "major successes" of the war on drugs.

On June 6, 2011, Kerlikowske published his report "Drug policies must be rooted in science," in response to a report calling for the decriminalization of illicit drugs by the Global Commission on Drug Policy. In the report, he denies the Commission's assertions that the war on drugs is failing and costing billions of the taxpayers' dollars. The report claims that the economic impact of illicit drug use is $80 billion for health care and productivity.

=== Commissioner of CBP ===
On August 1, 2013, President Obama nominated him to serve as Commissioner of U.S. Customs and Border Protection. On March 6, 2014, the U.S. Senate confirmed him as the first permanent commissioner for the agency that oversees both customs and immigration officers at the country’s ports of entry and the Border Patrol since before Obama took office in 2009.

== See also ==
- List of U.S. executive branch czars

Political offices
Preceded by Ed Jurith; Acting	Director of the Office of National Drug Control Policy; 2009–2014	Succeeded by Michael Botticelli
Preceded by Thomas S. Winkowski; Acting	Commissioner of U.S. Customs and Border Protection; 2014–2017	Succeeded by Kevin McAleenan
