= Office of National Drug Control Policy =

United States government agency

Agency overview
- Formed: October 27, 1989; 37 years ago
- Headquarters: Washington, D.C., U.S.
- Annual budget: $379.1 million
- Agency executive: Sara Carter, Director
- Parent agency: Executive Office of the President
- Website: www.whitehouse.gov/ondcp/

The Office of National Drug Control Policy (ONDCP) is a component of the Executive Office of the President of the United States.

The director of the ONDCP, colloquially known as the drug czar, heads the office. "Drug czar" was a term first used in the media by President Richard Nixon in 1971. In addition to running the ONDCP, the director evaluates, coordinates, and oversees both the international and domestic anti-drug efforts of executive branch agencies and ensures that such efforts sustain and complement state and local anti-drug activities. The director advises the president regarding changes in the organization, management, budgeting, and personnel of federal agencies that affect U.S. anti-drug efforts; and regarding federal agency compliance with their obligations under the National Drug Control Strategy, an annual report required by law.

Prior to Sara Carter taking office in January 2026, the most recent director was Rahul Gupta, who took over from former director James. W. Carroll. The fiscal year 2011 National Drug Control Budget proposed by the Obama administration devoted significant new resources to the prevention and treatment of drug abuse. These resources were complemented by an aggressive effort to enhance domestic law enforcement, interdiction, and supply control programs. New resources, valued at $340 million, were added to the prevention and treatment of drug use.

== Programs ==
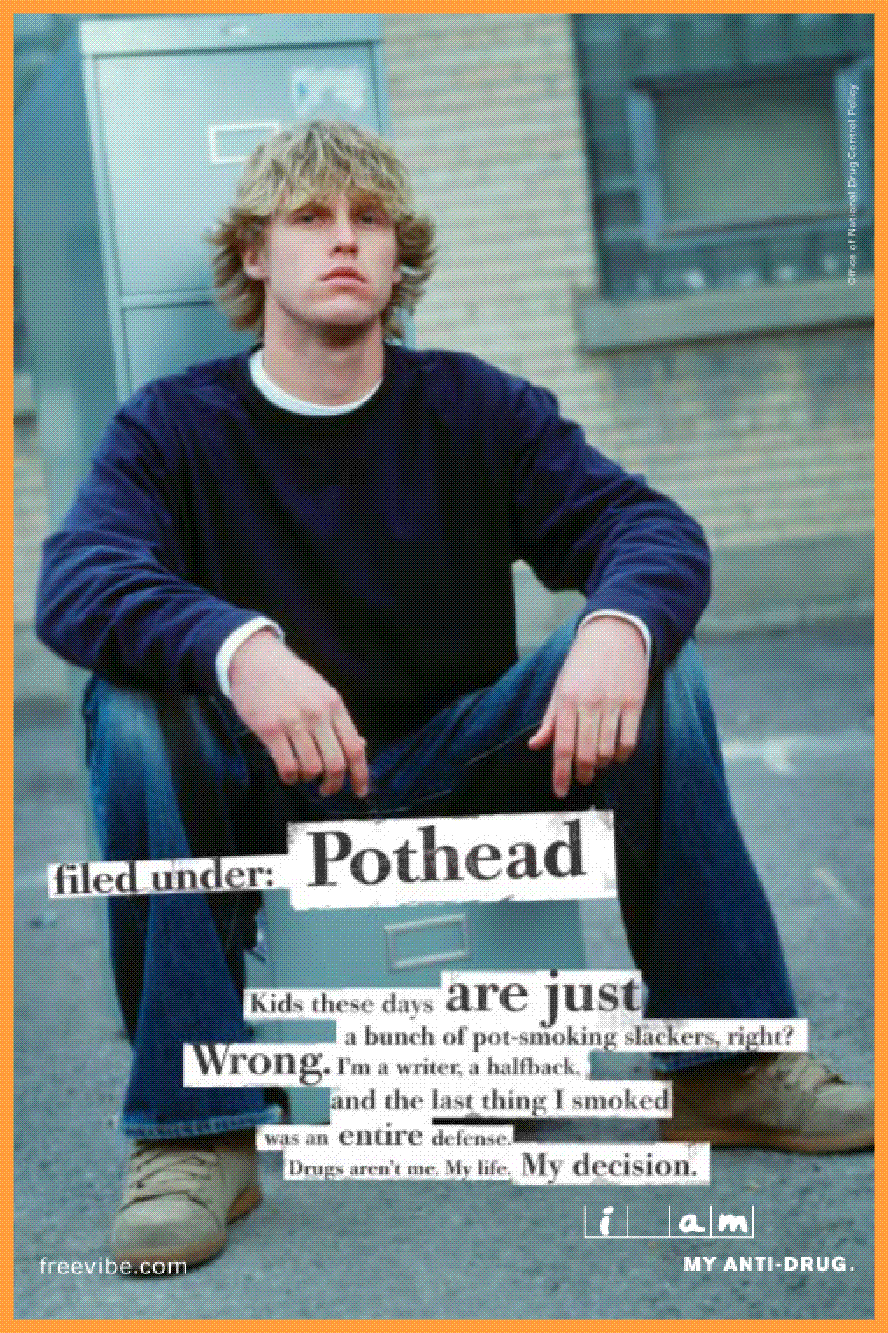
A National Youth Anti-Drug Media Campaign poster circa 2000 concerning cannabis in the United States

The programs directed by the ONDCP include:

- The High Intensity Drug Trafficking Areas (HIDTA) program
- The National Youth Anti-Drug Media Campaign, a current domestic government substance abuse prevention campaign in the US
- The Drug Free Communities Program
- Anti-doping activities
- World Anti-Doping Agency (WADA) dues

== Congressional issues ==
=== Bipartisan support for drug czar ===
The Anti-Drug Abuse Act of 1988, which created the Office of National Drug Control Policy, was the product of bi-partisan support. It was co-sponsored in the House of Representatives by Democratic and Republican leaders, Tom Foley and Robert Michel, and it passed by margins of 346–11 and 87–3 in the House and Senate, respectively. Upon signing the law, Ronald Reagan said, "This bill is the product of a bipartisan effort."

=== 1993 downsize ===
In February 1993, new U.S. president Bill Clinton greatly downsized the Office of National Drug Control Policy by 84 percent, reducing the staff size from 146 to 25.

=== Funding ===
In September 2002, the Senate Appropriations Committee recommended that salaries and expenses at ONDCP be reduced from $26.6 million in fiscal 2006 to $11.5 million in fiscal 2007, to "more closely reflect actual performance." Committee members said they would request funding for a study of ONDCP by the National Academy of Public Administration. They also ordered a Government Accountability Office study on the distribution of grants. Plus, they directed the Director to provide quarterly updates on travel expenditures, staffing levels and plans for future hirings.

In 2011, the ONDCP requested funding for 98 full-time employees, 64 (65.31%) of whom would be paid at either GS-15, GS-14, or SES pay grades, or more than $105,211.00 yearly, being adjusted for Washington, D.C. cost of living expenses.

=== High-Intensity Drug Trafficking Program ===
In 2005, the Bush administration proposed transferring the $225 million High-Intensity Drug Trafficking Program from ONDCP to the Department of Justice. The program gives additional money to designated areas with chronic illicit drug problems. According to The Washington Post, "Many lawmakers oppose the transfer for fear the program would become less of a priority."

=== Anti-legalization Policy ===
By law, the drug czar must oppose any attempt to legalize the use (in any form) of illicit drugs. According to the "Office of National Drug Control Policy Reauthorization Act of 1998" the director of the ONDCP

(12) shall ensure that no Federal funds appropriated to the Office of National Drug Control Policy shall be expended for any study or contract relating to the legalization (for a medical use or any other use) of a substance listed in schedule I of section 202 of the Controlled Substances Act (21 U.S.C. 812) and take such actions as necessary to oppose any attempt to legalize the use of a substance (in any form) that –

1. is listed in schedule I of section 202 of the Controlled Substances Act (21 U.S.C. 812); and

2. has not been approved for use for medical purposes by the Food and Drug Administration;

The Government Accountability Office has found that this law authorizes the ONDCP to disseminate information in order to oppose legalization:

Finally, apart from considerations of whether any particular law has been violated, you have asked whether the Deputy Director's letter disseminated misleading information in connection with statements relating to the debate over legalization of marijuana. Clearly, the Deputy Director's statements reflect one perspective regarding marijuana – a perspective that is disputed by others with different viewpoints. However, ONDCP is specifically charged with the responsibility for "taking such actions as necessary to oppose any attempt to legalize the use" of certain controlled substances such as marijuana – a responsibility which logically could include the making of advocacy statements in opposition to legalization efforts. The Deputy Director's statements about marijuana are thus within the statutory role assigned to ONDCP. Given this role, we do not see a need to examine the accuracy of the Deputy Director's individual statements in detail.

== Effectiveness of ONDCP ==
=== Extent of drug use in the U.S. ===
In September 2006, the office reported that the 2005 survey of 67,500 people found that 8.1 percent reported using an illicit drug in the 30 days prior to being asked about their drug use, which equates to 19.7 million people nationwide (age 12 and older). The percentage was up slightly compared to 2004, although youth drug use declined for the third year in a row. While the ONDCP measures their efficacy against prior use statistics within the U.S., they do not publicize how these statistics compare against other countries at the time in their communications to the press. In 2008, ONDCP reported that actual youth drug use, as measured as the percent reporting past month use, declined from 19.4% to 14.8% among middle and high school students between 2001 and 2007.

=== Anti-marijuana advertising ===
In August 2001, the office told a Congressional committee that its National Youth Anti-Drug Media Campaign "has been the most visible symbol of the federal government's commitment to drug prevention," and that the office was "investing $7 million a year in performance measurement to determine the effectiveness" of the campaign. The statement also said "We believe there is a strong body of evidence that indicates the campaign is working, as planned, to change drug attitudes, intentions and use."

In 2002, according to a multiyear study by the research firm hired by the office, teenagers exposed to federal anti-drug ads were no less likely to use drugs for having viewed them, and some young girls said they were even more likely to give drugs a try. Walters blamed poor ads that weren't resonating with teenagers. Walters promised in Senate testimony in 2002 that he would show results within a year or admit failure, and Congress agreed to extend the campaign through 2003 while cutting funding for the ads from $170 million in 2002 to $150 million in 2003. An entirely new advertising campaign was created.

In February 2005, a research company hired by the office and the National Institute on Drug Abuse reported that the government's ad campaign aimed at dissuading teens from using marijuana, a campaign that cost $1.4 billion between 1998 and 2006, did not work: "greater exposure to the campaign was associated with weaker anti-drug norms and increases in the perceptions that others use marijuana." The research company was paid $42.7 million for the five-year study. After the February 2005 report was received, the office continued the ad campaign, spending $220 million on the anti-marijuana ads in fiscal years 2005 and 2006.

=== Other ===
According to the University of Michigan's annual Monitoring the Future report, the number of young people using drugs in the U.S. declined by 7 percent between 2001 and 2006, though there is no evidence to suggest that government anti-drug programs that were started at the turn of the millennium helped cause this drop.

While cocaine production in Colombia initially decreased with the onset of Plan Colombia, the United Nations declared that in 2005, despite record levels of eradication by the U.S., coca production increased to about 330 square miles (850 km^{2}).

== Controversies ==
=== Paying for anti-drug messages in television shows ===
In the spring of 1998, the ONDCP began offering additional advertising dollars to networks that embedded anti-drug messages in their programming. They developed an accounting system to decide which network shows would be valued and for how much. Receiving advance copies of scripts, they assigned financial value to each show's anti-drug message. Then they would suggest ways that the networks could increase the payments they would get. The WB network's senior vice president for broadcast standards Rick Mater admitted, "The White House did view scripts. They did sign off on them – they read scripts, yes."

Running the campaign for the ONDCP was Alan Levitt, who estimated that between 1998 and 2000 the networks received nearly $25 million in benefits.

One example was with Warner Brothers' show, Smart Guy. The original script portrayed two young people using drugs at a party. Originally depicted as cool and popular, after input from the drug office, "We showed that they were losers and put them [hidden away to indulge in shamed secrecy] in a utility room. That was not in the original script."

Other shows including ER, Beverly Hills, 90210, Chicago Hope, The Drew Carey Show and 7th Heaven also put anti-drug messages into their stories.

In 2000, the Federal Communications Commission, in response to a complaint by the National Organization for the Reform of Marijuana Laws, sent inquiries to five major television networks about these practices. The House Committee on Government Reform's Subcommittee on Criminal Justice, Drug Policy and Human Resources held hearings on the matter on July 11, 2000. In December of that year, the FCC ruled that the networks should have identified the Office of National Drug Control Policy as the sponsor of the television programs.

=== State and local decriminalization ballot measures ===
In December 2002, the Marijuana Policy Project filed a complaint with the Nevada secretary of state accusing the drug czar John Walters of illegally campaigning against its 2002 ballot initiative to decriminalize possession of up to 3 ounces of cannabis in that state. Specifically, MPP argued that Nevada campaign finance laws required the drug czar to reveal how much taxpayer money he had spent to defeat the initiative. In April 2003, the Nevada attorney general concluded that the Drug Czar was not required to comply with Nevada's campaign finance laws. MPP filed a writ of mandamus as an appeal of the decision. The Nevada Supreme Court issued an order declaring that MPP had "set forth issues of arguable merit" in its writ; however, on August 18, 2004, the Court declared that it was "not satisfied that [the] court's intervention by way of extraordinary relief is warranted".

A February 24, 2005 MPP press release announced that the group had filed similar complaints in Montana, Oregon, and Alaska, accusing the Drug Czar of failing to make legally required campaign expense disclosures:

On October 5, 2004, the drug czar traveled to Oregon for the purpose of opposing Measure 33, a ballot measure designed to expand the state's medical marijuana program. On October 6, ONDCP Deputy Director Scott Burns traveled to Montana to campaign against Initiative 148, the medical marijuana measure passed by voters in November. And on October 13 and 14, Burns traveled to Alaska to oppose Measure 2, a measure to allow the state to tax and regulate the sale of marijuana. All of these trips were widely reported in the local press as being campaign stops in opposition to the reform initiatives.

=== Use of video news releases ===
In 2005, the Government Accountability Office found that the ONDCP had violated domestic propaganda and publicity prohibitions by preparing prepackaged video news releases that did not disclose to television viewers that the government had produced them. The GAO also found that the ONDCP had illegally spent appropriations to develop, produce and distribute the covert propaganda, but found that the use of the term "Drug Czar" in the "Video News Releases" had not constituted unlawful self-aggrandizement.

ONDCP supporters such as representatives Tom Davis and Mark Edward Souder have dismissed such criticism on the grounds that the ONDCP is expressly authorized by law to conduct anti-drug media campaigns. However, Henry Waxman, the ranking Democrat on the committee, disagreed with Davis and Souder, saying, "Their position is straight out of George Orwell. It's astonishing that members [of Congress] would defend using federal taxpayers to deceive the public. Fabricating news reports is illegal and unethical."

According to Susan A. Poling, managing associate general counsel at the GAO, "What is objectionable about these is the fact the viewer has no idea their tax dollars are being used to write and produce this video segment.".

=== 2017 reported shutdown ===
As early as February 2017, The New York Times had reported that the Trump administration was considering eliminating the office, and other programs responsible for a total of $2.5 billion of domestic spending. In May, the office's website was blanked and Politico and The Washington Post both reported that the office was about to be drastically defunded. The website was later back online.

== List of directors ==
The title of Director, as well as the office, was created by the Anti-Drug Abuse Act of 1988. The position had cabinet-level status from 1993 to 2009.

Denotes acting capacity.

=== Special Action Office for Drug Abuse Prevention (1971–1975) ===
Name	Start	End	President
Jerry Jaffe	June 17, 1971	June 17, 1973	Richard Nixon (1961–1974)
Robert DuPont	June 17, 1973	June 30, 1975	Richard Nixon (1961–1974)
Robert DuPont	June 17, 1973	June 30, 1975	Gerald Ford (1974–1977)

=== Office of Drug Abuse Policy (1977–1989) ===
Name	Start	End	President
Peter Bourne	January 20, 1977	June 20, 1978	Jimmy Carter (1977–1981)
Lee Dogoloff	June 20, 1978	January 20, 1981	Jimmy Carter (1977–1981)
Carlton Turner	July 1981	February 2, 1987	Ronald Reagan (1981–1989)
Ian Macdonald	February 2, 1987	January 20, 1989	Ronald Reagan (1981–1989)

=== Office of National Drug Control Policy (1989–present) ===
On March 28, 2025, President Donald Trump announced that Sara A. Carter would be the next director pending Senate confirmation.

Image	Name	Start	End	President
	Bill Bennett	March 13, 1989	December 13, 1990	George H. W. Bush (1989–1993)
	Bob Martinez	March 28, 1991	January 20, 1993	George H. W. Bush (1989–1993)
	John Walters; Acting	January 20, 1993	July 19, 1993	Bill Clinton (1993–2001)
	Lee Brown	July 19, 1993	January 1996	Bill Clinton (1993–2001)
	Barry McCaffrey	February 29, 1996	January 20, 2001	Bill Clinton (1993–2001)
	Ed Jurith; Acting	January 20, 2001	December 7, 2001	George W. Bush (2001–2009)
	John Walters	December 7, 2001	January 20, 2009	George W. Bush (2001–2009)
	Ed Jurith; Acting	January 20, 2009	May 7, 2009	Barack Obama (2009–2017)
	Gil Kerlikowske	May 7, 2009	March 6, 2014	Barack Obama (2009–2017)
	Michael Botticelli	March 6, 2014	February 11, 2015	Barack Obama (2009–2017)
	Michael Botticelli	February 11, 2015	January 20, 2017	Barack Obama (2009–2017)
	Kemp Chester; Acting	January 20, 2017	March 27, 2017	Donald Trump (2017–2021)
	Rich Baum; Acting	March 28, 2017	February 9, 2018	Donald Trump (2017–2021)
	Jim Carroll	February 9, 2018	January 3, 2019	Donald Trump (2017–2021)
	Jim Carroll	January 3, 2019	January 20, 2021	Donald Trump (2017–2021)
	Regina LaBelle; Acting	January 20, 2021	November 5, 2021	Joe Biden (2021–2025)
	Rahul Gupta	November 5, 2021	January 20, 2025	Joe Biden (2021–2025)
	Jon Rice; Acting	January 20, 2025	January 9, 2026	Donald Trump (2025–present)
	Sara Carter	January 9, 2026	Incumbent	Donald Trump (2025–present)

== Legislation and executive orders ==
- 1988 Anti-Drug Abuse Act
- 1993 Executive Order 12880
- 1994 Violent Crime Control and Law Enforcement Act
- 1996 Executive Order 12992
- 1996 Executive Order 13023
- 1997 Drug-Free Communities Act
- 1998 Media Campaign Act
- 1998 ONDCP Reauthorization Act
- 2000 Executive Order 13165
- Title 21 of the Code of Federal Regulations
- 2018 Reauthorization

== See also ==
- Drug Enforcement Administration
- Drug policy of the United States
- Legal issues of cannabis
- Medical cannabis
- Opioid and Drug Abuse Commission
- War on drugs
