= Regina LaBelle =

Addiction policy expert

Director of the Office of National Drug Control Policy
- Acting
- In office January 20, 2021 – November 5, 2021
- President: Joe Biden
- Preceded by: Jim Carroll
- Succeeded by: Rahul Gupta

Personal details
- Born: Killingly, Connecticut, U.S.
- Party: Democratic
- Education: Boston College (BA); Georgetown University (JD)

Regina LaBelle is a professor and the director of the Addiction and Public Policy Initiative at the Georgetown University Law Center's O’Neill Institute for National and Global Health Law. She was the acting director of the White House Office of National Drug Control Policy (ONDCP) from January 20, 2021 to November 5, 2021, and the only woman to ever lead this office. She was named deputy director and served as acting director by President Joe Biden on the first day of his presidency. Prior to her work with the Biden Administration, she was the Chief of Staff of ONDCP under President Barack Obama.

As Acting Director, LaBelle led the office in developing the Biden Administration’s drug policy priorities, including a historic focus on harm reduction programs in an effort to address the overdose epidemic. LaBelle has testified before the U.S. House and Senate.

== Career ==
Early in her career, LaBelle served as Legal Counsel to Mayor Greg Nickels. As legal counsel to Seattle's mayor, she worked to expand the rights and protections for Seattle residents. This included identifying executive branch opportunities to expand access to parental leave for adoptive parents where none had previously existed, revising executive branch policies to increase access to services for same-sex couples (prior to marriage equality), and identifying administrative actions to improve gun safety at the local level in the face of state gun safety preemption laws. During LaBelle’s employment with Mayor Nickels, his work on the city’s police accountability system resulted in expanded police oversight and accountability.

In 2009, LaBelle was appointed to a senior policy advisor to the Director of ONDCP, where she served until January 2017. Promoted to Chief of Staff, LaBelle co-wrote the Obama-Biden Administration's first prescription drug misuse prevention plan and led its Administration wide implementation.

When President Obama left office in 2017, LaBelle began a career in academia. She also served as a visiting fellow at the Duke Margolis Center for Health Policy.

In 2018, LaBelle founded the Addiction and Public Policy Initiative at The O'Neill Institute for National and Global Health Law at Georgetown University Law Center.

LaBelle conceptualized and launched the first of its kind Master of Science in Addiction Policy and Practice program at Georgetown University Graduate School of Arts and Sciences in 2018.

In 2021, Regina served on the Biden-Harris Administration's transition team and was subsequently appointed by the Administration as Deputy Director of ONDCP. LaBelle served as Acting Director of ONDCP, the first and only woman to serve in this role. As Acting Director, she established the Biden Administration’s Drug Policy Priorities, issued in 2021. which, for the first time, included harm reduction a central element of drug policy. The Priorities also emphasized evidence-based treatment and recovery support. LaBelle also founded the first ever translational science branch at ONDCP, which incorporated research into public policy to ensure that drug policies reflect the latest scientific evidence.

Political offices
Preceded by Jim Carroll	Director of the Office of National Drug Control Policy; Acting; 2021	Succeeded by Rahul Gupta
