= National Youth Anti-Drug Media Campaign =

American propaganda campaign

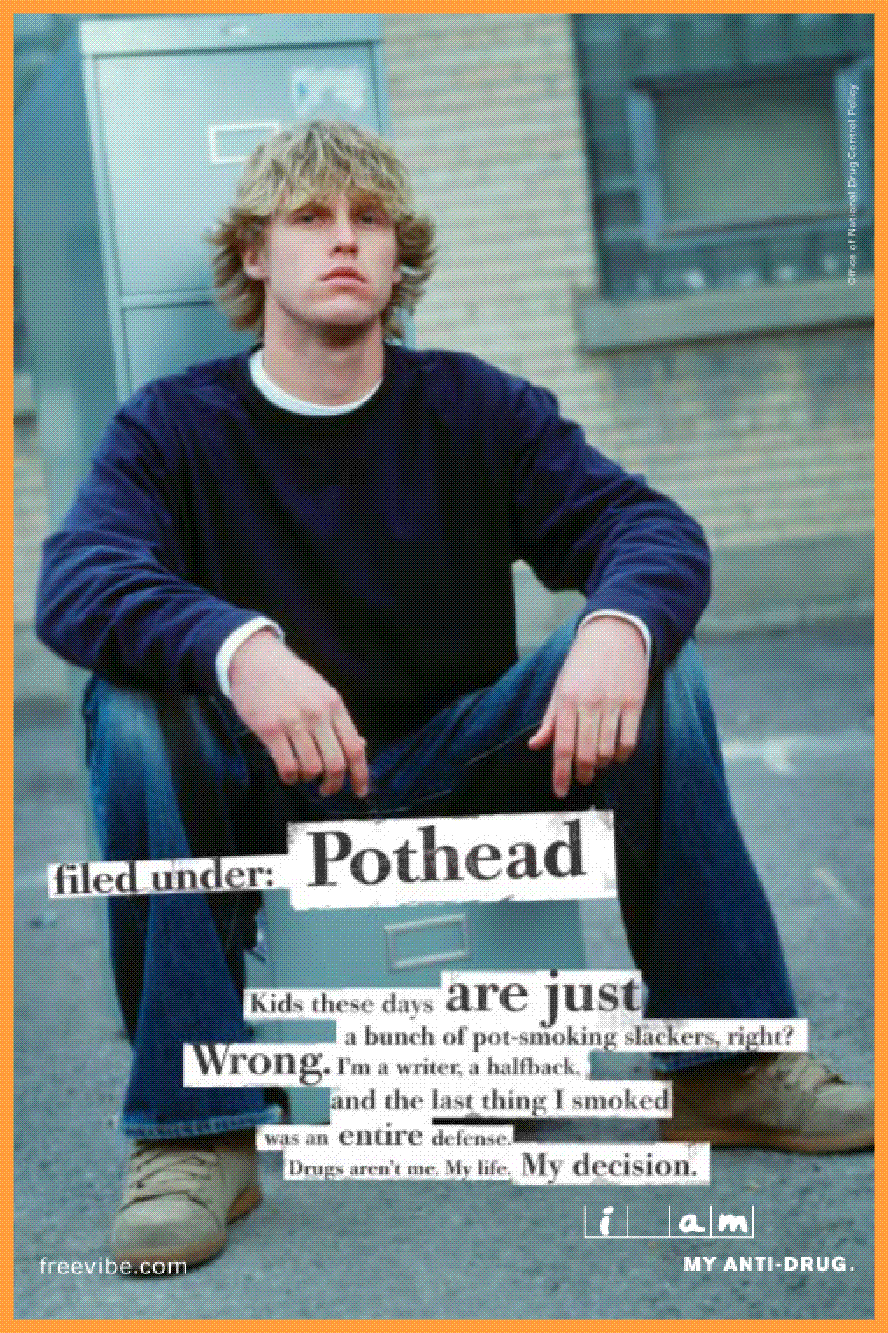
A poster circa 2000 concerning cannabis in the United States.

The National Youth Anti-Drug Media Campaign is a current US government health education campaign by the Office of National Drug Control Policy (ONDCP) within the Executive Office of the President of the United States with the goal to "influence the attitudes of the public and the news media with respect to drug abuse" and of "reducing and preventing drug abuse among young people in the United States".

The Media Campaign cooperates with the Partnership for a Drug-Free America and other government and non-government organizations.

== History ==
The Office of National Drug Control Policy (ONDCP) was originally established by the National Narcotics Leadership Act of 1988, which mandated a national anti-drug propaganda campaign for youth. These activities subsequently funded by the Treasury and General Government Appropriations Act of 1998, formally creating the National Youth Anti-Drug Media Campaign. The Drug-Free Media Campaign Act of 1998 codified the propaganda campaign at 21 U.S.C. § 1708.

== Effects ==
In August 2001, the office told a Congressional committee that its National Youth Anti-Drug Media Campaign "has been the most visible symbol of the federal government's commitment to drug prevention," and that the office was "investing $7 million a year in performance measurement to determine the effectiveness" of the campaign. The statement said "We believe there is a strong body of evidence that indicates the campaign is working, as planned, to change drug attitudes, intentions and use."

In 2002, according to a multi-year study by the research firm hired by the office, teenagers exposed to federal anti-drug ads were no less likely to use drugs for having viewed them, and some young girls said they were even more likely to give drugs a try. Walters blamed poor ads that weren't resonating with teenagers. Walters promised in Senate testimony in 2002 that he would show results within a year or admit failure, and Congress agreed to extend the campaign through 2003 while cutting funding for the ads from $170 million in 2002 to $150 million in 2003. An entirely new advertising campaign was created.

In February 2005, a research company hired by the office and the National Institute on Drug Abuse reported that the government's ad campaign aimed at dissuading teens from using marijuana, a campaign that cost $1.4 billion between 1998 and 2006, did not work: "greater exposure to the campaign was associated with weaker anti-drug norms and increases in the perceptions that others use marijuana." The research company was paid $42.7 million for the five-year study. After the February 2005 report was received, the office continued the ad campaign, spending $220 million on the anti-marijuana ads in fiscal years 2005 and 2006.

President Bush's goal in this campaign was to reduce youth drug use by 10% over two years, and 25% over 5 years. The National Survey of Parent and Youth (NSPY) was instituted and funded by congress to monitor and assess the NYADMC's effects on youth. Even though the advertisements themselves were only as specific as to address use of marijuana, the NSPY measurements reported alcohol consumption, binge drinking, cigarette use, and use of marijuana/hashish. The assessment consisted of multiple rounds of strategic questioning between years 2000 and 2004 to determine youths exposure to the advertisements, and behavioral patterns in relation to marijuana use. 94% of youth (ages 12.5-18) reported exposure to at least 1 anti-drug message per month. Those sampled didn't change marijuana usage over the time period measured. Youths claiming to have used marijuana within the past year in 2000 accounted for 17.1% in 2000, and dropped as little as .4% to 16.7% in 2004. However, there was a .4% increase in those claiming to have used marijuana within the past 30 days, rising from 7.8% to 8.2% between 2000 and 2004. There are also evidence of pro-marijuana lagged association effects. The rate of acceleration in use was quicker at among 14- to 18-year-olds than at earlier stages of teenage years.

Not only do data indicate the ineffectiveness of much anti-drug advertising, results also point to behavioral reactions in the opposite direction, or a boomerang effect, where greater exposure to the campaign, resulted in increased use of marijuana. Of those unexposed to ads on a given month, 81% did not intend to use marijuana, That percentage decreased for youth exposed to 1-3 ads per month, to 79% and dropped to 78% among those exposed to more than 4 advertisements per month. Also measured, were attitudes such as 'anti-marijuana attitudes/beliefs' and 'anti-marijuana social norms'. Both of these index's portray declining percentages with increased exposure to ads. Anti-marijuana publicity, may have stimulated the notion that “‘everyone’s doing it,’” therefore heightenening the appeal of using marijuana, as a popular practice. The ads had an unintended positive impact on perceptions towards marijuana use as they portrayed benefits within the context of using marijuana. This association was strengthened with repeat exposure. Images that lead to such impressions included focusing on the "good-times" people were having while on drugs, happily socializing. These impressions heightened the appeal of marijuana, thus making people more likely to initiate use, or increase use. Youth's beliefs and behaviors were also affected by those of their older siblings. Since older brothers and sisters were more interested in using marijuana after seeing the ads, the campaign had an indirect effect on younger siblings as well.

The NYADMC achieved some of its favorable effects with regard to reaching their message to the parents of youth. Parent's behavior and beliefs indicate greater likeliness to engage children in fun activities, talk about drugs, and responsiveness to the idea of monitoring their children's behavior.

According to the Office of National Drug Control Policy (ONDCP), the institution that administered the campaign, the next initiative was overall successful. The ONDCP's independent studies indicate that "youth exposed to Above the Influence are less likely to initiate drug use." Another similar media initiative, called "Be Under Your Own Influence" ran from 2005 to 2009, which results indicate that it was effective, to a lesser extent than the Above the Influence campaign, which was running concurrently. The plausible explanation for this is that they already had been influenced by the ATI, such that the Be Under Your Own Influence campaign was repeating a message that had already been established. Another study found the impact of the campaign was effective on both high-sensation-seeking and low-sensation-seeking youth.

The campaign launched a result-tracking initiative to comprise the Annual Analysis Report to Congress, as required by the Office of National Drug Control Policy Reauthorization Act of 2006. In 2010, the Above the Influence (ATI) message expanded from focusing primarily on marijuana, to other drugs such as methamphetamine.

== See also ==
- Government propaganda in the United States
- National Institute on Drug Abuse
- Partnership for a Drug Free America
- Sundt Memorial Foundation
