= Rahul Gupta =

American physician

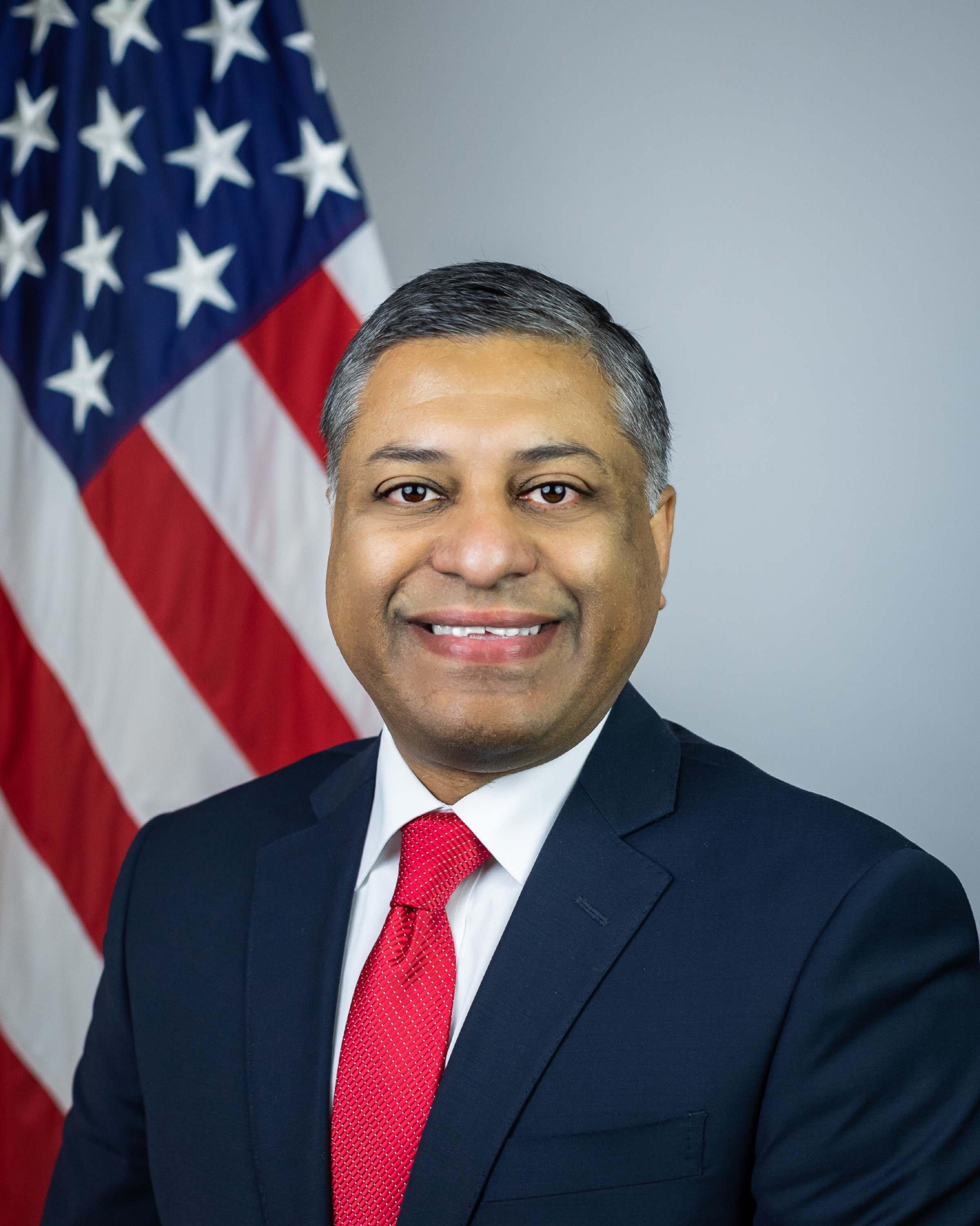
- Gupta in 2022

Director of the Office of National Drug Control Policy
- In office November 5, 2021 – January 20, 2025
- President: Joe Biden
- Preceded by: Regina LaBelle (acting)
- Succeeded by: Jon Rice (acting)

Personal details
- Born: 1970 or 1971 (age 55–56) India
- Education: Delhi University (MD); University of Alabama, Birmingham (MPH); London School of Business and Finance (MBA)

Rahul Gupta (born 1970 or 1971) is an American physician from the state of West Virginia. In 2021, he was appointed to serve as director of the Office of National Drug Control Policy by President Joe Biden. He formerly served at the helm of the West Virginia Bureau for Public Health.

== Early life ==
Gupta was born in India and raised in a suburb of Washington, D.C. His father is a diplomat. Gupta earned his Doctor of Medicine from the University College of Medical Sciences of Delhi University. He earned a Master of Public Health from the University of Alabama at Birmingham (UAB). He worked as an assistant professor of medicine at Meharry Medical College and at UAB.

== Medical career ==
Gupta ran the Kanawha-Charleston Health Department from 2009 to 2014. He became the director of the West Virginia Bureau for Public Health, an agency housed within the West Virginia Department of Health and Human Resources, in 2015.

In this role, he focused on reducing overdose deaths from the opioid epidemic. He also led West Virginia's response to the Zika virus and Ebola epidemics. He left the role in 2018 to become the chief medical officer of the March of Dimes, a nonprofit organization.

== Biden administration ==
Gupta was the lead member of the 2020 presidential transition of Joe Biden for the Office of National Drug Control Policy (ONDCP). Biden nominated him to be director of the ONDCP on July 13, 2021. His nomination was confirmed by the United States Senate on October 28, and he was sworn into office on November 18.

Upon taking office, Gupta noted that addressing "the overdose epidemic that has claimed more than 100,000 lives between April 2020 and April 2021" would be his priority. In office, he has pushed for funding opioid addiction treatment programs for incarcerated individuals.

Political offices
Preceded by Regina LaBelle; Acting	Director of the Office of National Drug Control Policy; 2021–2025	Succeeded by Jon Rice; Acting
