= Drug czar =

Informal name for a policy position

Drug czar is an informal name for the person who directs drug-control policies in various areas. The term follows the informal use of the term czar in U.S. politics. The 'drug czar' title first appeared in a 1982 news story by United Press International that reported that, "[United States] Senators ... voted 62–34 to establish a 'drug czar' who would have overall responsibility for U.S. drug policy." Since then, several ad hoc executive positions established in both the United States and United Kingdom have been referred to in this manner.

== Germany ==
The Drug Commissioner of the German Federal Government has been called the nation's drug czar by the state media company Deutsche Welle.

== United States ==
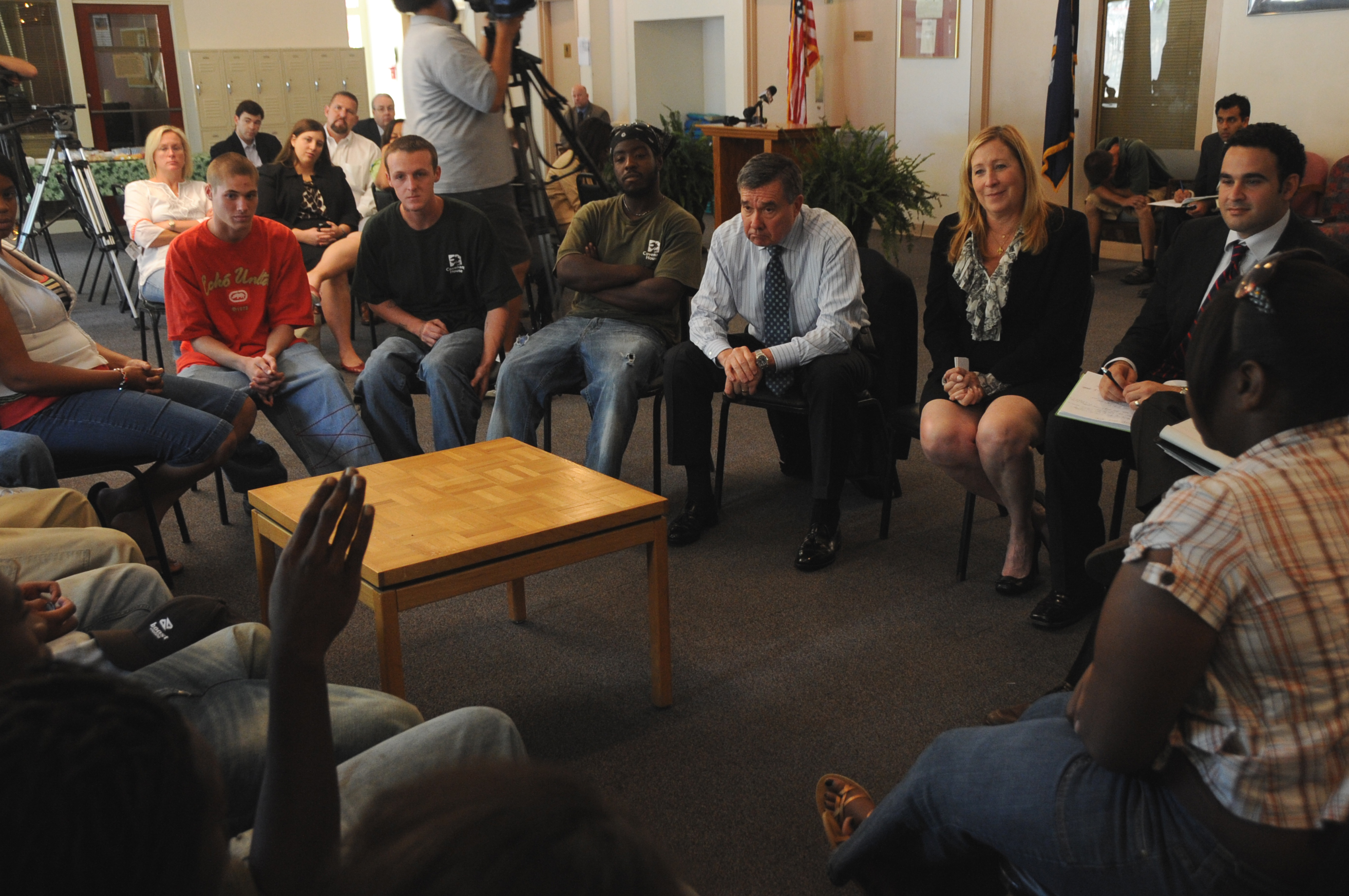
Drug Czar Gil Kerlikowske speaks with staff and patients at the Covenant House, which helps drug-addicted teenagers and adults.

The first US Drug czar was Harry J. Anslinger, who served as the first Commissioner of the Treasury Department's Federal Bureau of Narcotics from 1930 to 1962, under the administrations of five presidents: Herbert Hoover, Franklin Delano Roosevelt, Harry S. Truman, Dwight D. Eisenhower and John F. Kennedy. Legislative efforts for marijuana prohibition under Anslinger included a push for all states to adopt similar drug laws, the Uniform State Narcotic Drug Act and the Marijuana Tax Act of 1937, which in effect criminalized the drug and set the stage for marijuana prohibition.

=== Nixon and Ford administrations ===
- Jerome Jaffe, head of the Special Office for Drug Abuse Prevention
- Myles Ambrose, head of the Office of Drug Abuse Law Enforcement (ODALE)
- Robert DuPont, Director of the National Institute on Drug Abuse (NIDA) and head of the Narcotics Treatment Administration

=== Carter administration ===
- Peter Bourne, Director of the National Drug Control Policy followed by Lee I Dogoloff
- Mathea Falco, Assistant Secretary of State for International Narcotics

=== Reagan administration ===
- Carlton Turner PhD, ScD, Director of the Drug Abuse Policy Office. Turner, while working as drug czar, was in communication with Elisaldo Carlini, a scientist in Brazil whose lab was studying the beneficial effects of CBD. Turner helped establish the Marijuana Research Project at the University of Mississippi
- D. Ian McDonald, MD. Deputy Assistant to the President, Drug Abuse Policy Office
- Vice President George H.W. Bush, who created and oversaw the Vice President's National Narcotics Border Interdiction System

=== 1988–present ===
- The Director of the Office of National Drug Control Policy

=== Trump administration ===
- The Chair of the Opioid and Drug Abuse Commission, (Note: In March 2017, it was announced that governor of New Jersey Chris Christie was to head the commission.) (who has been described as an "opioid czar")

=== State and local authorities ===
In California, the head of the state Bureau of Medical Cannabis has been called "marijuana czar".

Following statewide medical and recreational legalization, the city of Sacramento, California appointed a director of cannabis policy and enforcement, called a pot czar.

In Washington State, the consultant to the Washington State Liquor and Cannabis Board determining statewide procedures and regulations following legalization was "quickly dubbed 'pot czar'". A similar cannabis regulation staff position in Oregon Liquor Control Commission was also called "marijuana czar".

== United Kingdom ==
In the UK, Keith Hellawell, former Drugs Advisor to the Labour government of Tony Blair, has been referred to as a drug czar.

== See also ==
- List of U.S. executive branch 'czars'
