= Jerome Jaffe =

Jerry Jaffe
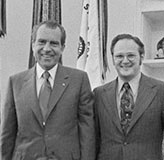
- Jaffe and Nixon in the Oval Office in 1972

Director of the Special Action Office for Drug Abuse Prevention (SAODAP)
- In office June 17, 1971 – June 17, 1973
- President: Richard Nixon
- Preceded by: Position established
- Succeeded by: Robert DuPont

Personal details
- Born: Jerome Herbert Jaffe; July 6, 1933 (age 93) Philadelphia, Pennsylvania, U.S.
- Party: Republican
- Spouse: Faith Kessel (m. 1958)
- Children: 3
- Education: Temple University (BA, MA, MD)

Jerome H. Jaffe (born July 6, 1933) is a clinical professor and was the drug Czar under the administration of President of the United States Richard Nixon.

== Career ==
Many American soldiers used heroin during the Vietnam War. According to Representative Robert Steele in a report for the House Foreign Affairs Committee, there was little use in the Army until late 1969. But by 1971, 10 to 15 percent of the troops in Vietnam were using heroin from the Golden Triangle. It was about this time that based on the efforts of Jaffe, methadone clinics were established in the U.S., partly to treat addicted veterans.

Under the administration of President Nixon, Jerome Jaffe was the chief of the Special Action Office for Drug Abuse Prevention (SAODAP), an executive agency created by President Nixon, a member of the Republican Party of the United States. During his career, he popularized the use of methadone treatments for heroin addicts, stating that "There was evidence that methadone treatment was effective. There were some good controlled studies." He also initiated "methadone programs, detoxification programs, and therapeutic communities." Jaffe was an opponent of ibogaine trials to treat drug dependency, concentrating instead on replacement therapies with alternative opiates like methadone and buprenorphine.

Currently, Jaffe is a clinical professor in the Department of Psychiatry at the University of Maryland School of Medicine in Baltimore, where he works in the Division of Alcohol and Drug Abuse. He lives in Maryland and has three grandchildren.
