= Peter Bourne =

English-American civil servant

Director of the Office of Drug Abuse Policy
- In office January 20, 1977 – June 20, 1978
- President: Jimmy Carter
- Preceded by: Robert DuPont (Special Action Office for Drug Abuse Prevention, 1975)
- Succeeded by: Lee Dogoloff

Personal details
- Born: Peter Geoffrey Bourne; August 6, 1939 (age 86) Oxford, England, UK
- Party: Democratic
- Spouse: Mary King
- Education: Emory University (MD); Stanford University (MA)

Peter Geoffrey Bourne (born 6 August 1939) is a physician, anthropologist, author and international civil servant. He is currently a visiting senior research fellow at Green Templeton College, Oxford, vice-chancellor emeritus at St. George's University in Grenada, and chair of the Medical Education Cooperation with Cuba. He is also a distinguished fellow of the Rothermere American Institute at the University of Oxford.

== Background ==
Bourne was born on 6 August 1939 in Oxford, England. He received his early education at the Dragon School before attending Whitgift School, Croydon. Following a year of undergraduate studies (1957–1958) at Emory University in Atlanta, Georgia, Bourne was admitted to the university's School of Medicine, where he received his M.D. degree in 1962. He later received an M.A. in anthropology from Stanford University in 1969.

== Career ==
=== Early career ===
After graduating from medical school, Bourne spent a year (1962–1963) as a fellow in Emory University's psychiatry department studying arrested alcoholics in the city jail in Atlanta. He established a groundbreaking program through which arrested alcoholics could take the drug antabuse as an alternative to serving prison time. He was active in the civil rights movement and participated in the effort to integrate lunch counters in the city. For the next year, he was a rotating intern at King County Hospital in Seattle.

In 1964, Bourne was commissioned as a captain in the United States Army Medical Corps. He was assigned to the Walter Reed Army Institute of Research (WRAIR), where he studied the psychological and physiological effects of stress on basic trainees as a research psychiatrist. He spent one year (1965–1966) in Vietnam as chief of the neuropsychiatry section of the Army's Psychiatric Research Team, where he studied stress in helicopter ambulance medics and Special Forces. These were considered landmark studies in the field of psychoimmunology. During his service, he was awarded the Bronze Star Medal, the Air Medal and the Combat Medics Badge.

Upon discharge from the Army, he was active in the anti-war movement and completed a residency (1967–1969) in psychiatry at Stanford University while concurrently pursuing graduate studies in anthropology. Bourne also worked as a volunteer at the Haight-Ashbury Free Clinic during this period.

In 1969, Bourne returned to Emory University as an assistant professor of psychiatry, preventive medicine and community health. He ran the mental health department of a federally-funded Community Health Center which he eventually expanded into the first free-standing community mental health center in Georgia. He also continued to play an active role in the integration efforts in Georgia and the South. Together with his first wife, Judith Rooks, Bourne led an effort to overturn Georgia's restrictive abortion laws. Having failed in the state legislature, together with other plaintiffs, they filed suit against the state on behalf of Jane Doe, a patient seeking an abortion for whom Bourne was the physician of record. Following victories for the plaintiffs in the state courts the case, as Doe vs Bolton, was appealed to the Supreme Court of the US. It was heard together with the better known case from Texas, Roe vs Wade. The court's watershed ruling based on the two cases transformed women's access to abortion in the US. He was active with the American Psychiatric Association (APA), chairing the organization's Task Force on Drugs and Drug Abuse Education and serving on the Task Force on the Treatment of Psychiatric Disorders. He has served on the editorial board of the journal Psychiatry since 1969. In 2008 he was made a Distinguished Life Fellow of the APA. In 1972 he was named one of "The Five Outstanding Young Men in Georgia."

Bourne had run, as part of his mental health center, a treatment program for heroin addicts. In 1971, Bourne established Georgia's first statewide drug treatment program under Governor Jimmy Carter; from 1970 to 1973, he also served as Carter's special advisor for health affairs. He remained personally close to Carter and was influential in convincing him to run for the American presidency. Bourne would later become a key strategist and deputy campaign director for Carter, running the Washington office for the successful 1976 presidential campaign from 1975 to 1977.

As a result of setting up and successfully running Georgia's first statewide drug treatment program, Bourne left Emory in 1973 to take a position as assistant director in charge of treatment programs in President Richard Nixon's Special Action Office of Drug Abuse Prevention (SAODAP). He did so with the intention of resigning as soon as Carter announced his plans to run for the presidency. Upon leaving the administration in 1974, he served as president of the Foundation for International Resources and a fellow at the Drug Abuse Council through 1976. From 1974 to 1979, he was also a lecturer in psychiatry at Harvard Medical School with a clinical appointment at McLean Hospital in Boston, Massachusetts. Throughout this frenetic period, he also held consultancies with the World Health Organization and the UN Commission on Narcotic Drugs.

=== US drug czar (1977–1978) ===
After supporting Carter in the 1976 United States presidential election, Bourne was appointed as special assistant to the president for health issues and director of the Office of Drug Abuse Policy (ODAP), the predecessor of the current Office of National Drug Control Policy. Under his leadership, the number of deaths from drug overdoses dropped to its lowest level in 30 years. Bourne served as the personal envoy of the president of the United States in bilateral discussions with heads of state or government in Burma, Colombia, Thailand, the Philippines and Jamaica. Bourne chaired the World Hunger Working Group and Interagency Committee on World Health, sub-cabinet committees formed to formulate policy on hunger and global health. From 1977 to 1978, he also served in the American delegation to the United Nations Commission on Narcotic Drugs and the United Nations Development Programme.

During his tenure, the Mexican government asked for American permission to spray illegal cannabis fields with the pesticide paraquat. Feeling that denial would violate Mexican sovereignty, Bourne convinced Carter to agree, despite the risk of contaminating the United States' imported cannabis with toxic chemicals. When Keith Stroup, founder of the National Organization for the Reform of Marijuana Laws (NORML), was unable to convince Bourne that such pesticides threatened the health of American users of cannabis, Stroup began telling journalists that Bourne had used cannabis and cocaine at a NORML Christmas party. While Bourne denied the allegation, he was simultaneously receiving backlash for prescribing Quaaludes and "diet pills" to multiple White House employees without official physician-patient relationships. In response, he resigned on July 20, 1978.

=== United Nations (1979–1982) ===
In 1979, Bourne became an Assistant Secretary-General at the United Nations, where he established and ran the "International Drinking Water and Sanitation Decade," a 10-year program that would provide clean drinking water to more than 500 million people worldwide. As part of the program Bourne launched, in collaboration with the Centers for Disease Control and Prevention, a global campaign to eradicate the water borne disease caused by guinea worm. Eventually, he convinced Carter to become the public face of the campaign, which is now nearing complete success.

=== 1982–1998 ===
After leaving the UN in 1982 for the private sector, Bourne established an NGO, Global Water, to pursue the same goals as the UN program. He began serving on the boards of numerous charities including Save the Children, The Hunger Project (chairman of the board, 1998–2009), Health and Development International, International Health Society, Student Partnerships Worldwide (SPW), the American Association for World Health (chairman of the board), American Public Health Association, The Institute for Human Virology (IHV), Royal Society of Medicine (fellow), the Center for Genetics Nutrition and Health and the Jefferson Awards for Public Service. Bourne also served on the Jury of the prestigious medical prize, The Lasker Awards. He also became president of Tropica Development Ltd, a company involved in fostering economic programs in Africa.

Building on a long-standing interest in the Cuban health care system and relationships established during several visits to the country when in the White House and at the UN, Bourne published in 1986 a well received biography of Fidel Castro. In 1995 as chairman of the American Association for World Health he directed a year-long foundation-supported study of the impact of the US embargo on health and nutrition in CubaDenial of Food and Medicine: The Impact of the US Embargo on Health and Nutrition in Cuba. He co-authored the subsequent report. The study, translated into six languages, drew worldwide attention and lead to the establishment of the NGO, Medical Education Cooperation with Cuba (MEDICC). Its initial objective was to enable senior US medical students to spend six-week electives with family doctors in Cuba. Over five years more than 1,500 students from virtually every medical school in the U.S. took advantage of this program. In 2004 Federal regulations with regard to Cuba were changed making impossible to continue this student program. MEDICC then focussed on the production of a movie on the Cuban health system, the publication of a peer-reviewed, English language journal on Cuban health and medicine and the recruitment of delegations of high level health policy makers to visit Cuba.

As an informal foreign policy advisor to Bill Richardson, Bourne accompanied the legislator to Baghdad in 1995 for a meeting he had negotiated with Saddam Hussein to secure the release of two American aerospace workers who had been captured by the Iraqis after wandering over the Kuwait border. Richardson and Bourne subsequently collaborated on a number of such efforts in Iran, Peru, Cuba, Bangladesh, the United Arab Emirates, Kenya, and North Korea, where they helped win the release of an American lay preacher who had crossed to the wrong side of the border.

=== Vice-Chancellor, St. George's University, Grenada (1998–2003) ===
Beginning in 1980, Bourne had been, on a part-time basis, chairman of the Department of Psychiatry at St. George's University Medical School in Grenada; in this capacity, he oversaw the placement and supervision of medical students in psychiatric teaching hospitals in the US and the UK. In 1998, he moved to Grenada and became Vice Chancellor of St. George's University. Over the next five years he built and enhanced the reputation of the medical school, established a school of veterinary medicine, grew the embryonic school of arts and sciences into the second largest institution in the region for students of Caribbean origin, opened a program in public health granting an MPH degree, and started a department of marine biology. He also launched on campus, in collaboration with the West Indies Cricket Board, The Shell Cricket as the main training institution for the West Indies cricket team. It gave the university, for the first time, recognition and acceptance throughout the English-speaking Caribbean.

=== Later career ===
In 2003 Bourne left Grenada and returned to Washington, D.C. He was appointed as a visiting senior research fellow at Green Templeton College at the University of Oxford and began dividing his time between the US and the UK. This included increasing the time he spent at his farm in Wales, where he raised red deer, llamas and North American bison. In 2012 he was made a visiting distinguished fellow at the Rothermere American Institute of Oxford University. At Green Templeton College he was on the steering committee of the annual Emerging Markets Symposium.

Bourne is a member of the Reform Club (London), the Special Forces Club (London), and a Fellow of the Royal Society of Medicine. A recreational runner he was, in 1993, nationally ranked in the marathon for his age group (age 44yrs) after completing the Marine Corps marathon in 2 hours, 45 min, 14 secs. At age 73 years he came in first in the over-70 category in the Oxford Half-Marathon. He also has a private pilot's license.

== Books ==
- Fidel – a biography of Fidel Castro, Dodd, Mead and Company, 1986
- Jimmy Carter: a comprehensive biography from Plains to postpresidency, Charles Scribner's Sons, 1997
