= Robert DuPont =

American psychiatrist

Director of the Special Action Office for Drug Abuse Prevention
- In office June 17, 1973 – June 30, 1975
- President: Richard Nixon; Gerald Ford
- Preceded by: Jerome Jaffe
- Succeeded by: Peter Bourne (Office of Drug Abuse Policy, 1977)

Personal details
- Born: Robert Louis DuPont Jr. March 25, 1936 (age 90) Toledo, Ohio, U.S.
- Party: Democratic
- Education: Emory University (BA); Harvard University (MD)

Robert Louis DuPont Jr. (born March 25, 1936) is an American psychiatrist, known for his advocacy in the field of substance abuse. He is president of the Institute for Behavior and Health, whose mission is "to reduce the use of illegal drugs". He has written books including Chemical Slavery: Understanding Addiction and Stopping the Drug Epidemic, The Selfish Brain: Learning from Addiction, as well as Drug Testing in Treatment Settings, Drug Testing in Schools, and Drug Testing in Correctional Settings, published by the Hazelden Foundation. DuPont is a fellow of the American Society of Addiction Medicine and a life fellow of the American Psychiatric Association.

== Career ==
In 1958 DuPont earned his BA from Emory University and in 1963 earned his M.D. from Harvard Medical School. He completed training at Harvard and the National Institutes of Health. He worked for the District of Columbia Department of Corrections and in 1970 for the DC Narcotics Treatment Administration.

DuPont was the first Director of the National Institute on Drug Abuse from 1973 to 1978 and was the second White House Drug Czar from 1973 to 1977 under presidents Richard Nixon and Gerald Ford. In 1978, DuPont met with Marsha "Keith" Schuchard, a parental rights activist who argued that state-level decriminalization of cannabis had allowed the drug to be dangerously accessed by minors. Convinced that marijuana was actually "the most dangerous drug," DuPont left his position to found the Institute for Behavior and Health that year.

In 1980, DuPont became a clinical professor of psychiatry at the Georgetown University School of Medicine, and founded the Anxiety Disorders Association of America. In 1981, he served as a paid consultant for Straight, Incorporated, one of the few drug treatment programs at that time that enrolled adolescents, which was the subject of numerous allegations of abuse, and which was successfully sued for false imprisonment and maltreatment. In 1982, Peter B. Bensinger and DuPont founded Bensinger, DuPont & Associates, a national consulting firm. DuPont maintains a psychiatric practice in Maryland specializing in addiction and anxiety disorders.

== Family ==
His younger brother is Herbert L. DuPont, M.D. On July 14, 1962, in Hennepin County, Minnesota, Robert L. DuPont married Helen G. Spink, whose father Wesley W. Spink, M.D., mentored Herbert DuPont. Robert and Helen DuPont have two children.

== Sources ==
- Biography of Robert L. DuPont, MD, Institute for Behavior and Health, Inc. https://www.ibhinc.org/leadership
