= Barry McCaffrey =

United States Army general

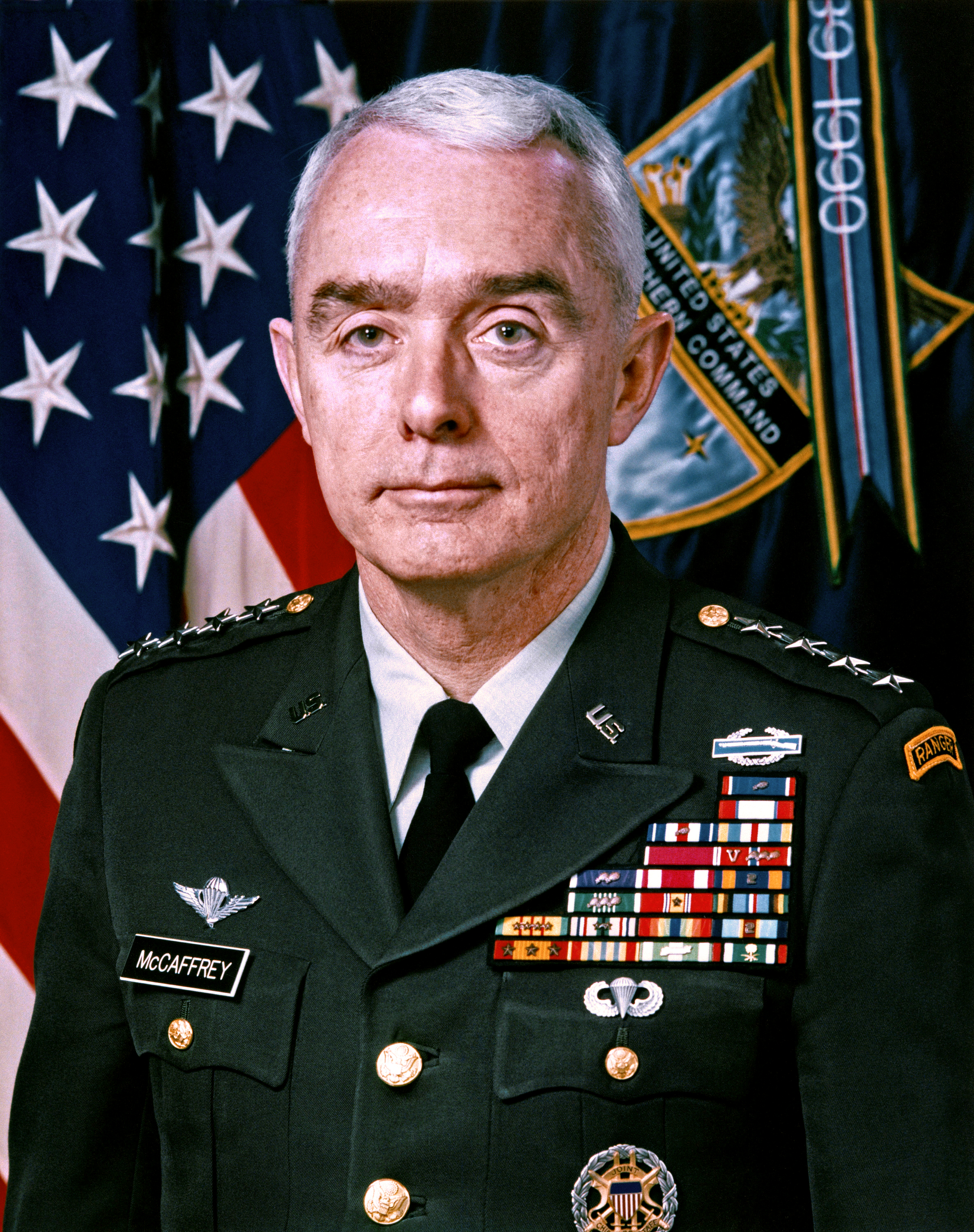
- Official portrait, 1994

Director of the Office of National Drug Control Policy
- In office 29 February 1996 – 20 January 2001
- President: Bill Clinton
- Preceded by: Lee Brown
- Succeeded by: Ed Jurith (acting)

Personal details
- Born: Barry Richard McCaffrey; 17 November 1942 (age 84) Taunton, Massachusetts, U.S.
- Spouse: Jill Ann Faulkner
- Parent: William J. McCaffrey (father)
- Education: United States Military Academy (BS); American University (MA)

Military service
- Allegiance: United States
- Branch: United States Army
- Service years: 1964–1996
- Rank: General
- Commands: United States Southern Command; 24th Infantry Division
- Conflicts: Vietnam War; Gulf War
- Awards: Distinguished Service Cross (2); Defense Distinguished Service (2); Army Distinguished Service (2); Silver Star (2); Defense Superior Service Medal; Legion of Merit; Bronze Star Medal (4); Purple Heart (3)

Barry Richard McCaffrey (born 17 November 1942) is a retired United States Army general and current news commentator, professor and business consultant who served in President Bill Clinton's Cabinet as the Director of the Office of National Drug Control Policy. He received three Purple Heart medals for injuries sustained during his service in the Vietnam War, two Silver Stars, and two Distinguished Service Crosses—the second-highest United States Army award for valor. He was inducted into United States Army Ranger Hall of Fame at the United States Army Infantry Center at Fort Benning in 2007.

McCaffrey served as an adjunct professor at the United States Military Academy and was its Bradley Professor of International Security Studies from 2001 to 2008. He received West Point Association of Graduates of the United States Military Academy's Distinguished Graduate Award in 2010. He is currently a paid military analyst for NBC and MSNBC as well as president of his own consulting firm, BR McCaffrey Associates. He serves on many boards of directors of national corporations. He is an outspoken advocate for insurance parity, for drug courts, and veterans' courts; he is a frequent speaker at conferences. In March 2018, he claimed that United States president Donald Trump was under the sway of Russian President Vladimir Putin and that it was a dangerous threat for the security of the United States.

== Early life and education ==
McCaffrey graduated from Phillips Academy in 1960 and the United States Military Academy in 1964. He received a Master of Arts in civil government from American University in 1970 and attended Harvard University's National Security Program and Business School Executive Education Program. While on active duty McCaffrey attended the United States Army War College, the Command and General Staff College, the Defense Language Institute's program in Vietnamese, and the Armor School Advanced Course.

== Military career ==
Following his graduation from West Point, McCaffrey was commissioned into the infantry. His combat tours included action in the Dominican Republic with 82nd Airborne Division in 1965, advisory duty with Army of the Republic of Vietnam from 1966 to 1967, and company command with 1st Cavalry Division from 1968 to 1969. During the course of his service, he was twice awarded the Distinguished Service Cross, the Purple Heart three times for wounds sustained in combat, and the Silver Star twice.

McCaffrey's peacetime assignments included tours as an instructor at United States Military Academy from 1972 to 1975, Assistant Commandant at the United States Army Infantry School; Deputy United States Representative to NATO; Assistant to the chairman, Joint Chiefs of Staff (JCS); and Director of Strategic Plans and Policy, Joint Chiefs of Staff.

=== "Left Hook" attack ===
During Operation Desert Storm, McCaffrey commanded the 24th Infantry Division (Mechanized). Under his command, the division conducted the "left hook" attack 230 miles (370 km) into Iraq, leading to decisive battle victory in the Gulf War and also putting troops in place for the final battle of the war.

In his book Prodigal Soldiers, James Kitfield recounted McCaffrey's "left hook" attack plan. McCaffrey commanded "two entire Army corps deep into Iraqi territory. If successful, and no army in history had ever moved a force that size over 300 miles (480 km) on the time line General H. Norman Schwarzkopf was reciting, the move would flank the Republican Guard divisions in Kuwait and cut off all avenues of retreat... The briefing left McCaffrey slightly stunned. He was part of the flanking force, and his mind was already starting to race over a logistics problem the war colleges would call a potential war-stopper, yet he had one overriding thought: We're not going to fight a war of attrition, or a limited war. It was a revelation. He saw now that the Army was going to play to its strengths and the enemy's weakness. By God, we learned. We learned (from the lessons of Vietnam)."

In their book The Generals' War: The Inside Story of the Conflict in the Gulf, Michael R. Gordon and General Bernard E. Trainor wrote more about the "left hook" attack:

It was the largest air assault in Army history and gave the (French 6th) Division a staging area for launching attacks in western Iraq and attacking Highway 8, the east-west route along the Euphrates (River).

Racing ahead with his fuel trucks, McCaffrey's division was roaring northward, with the 3rd Armored Cavalry Regiment providing protection to its flank. McCaffrey was speeding toward the Euphrates River at a remarkable 30 miles an hour over rocky terrain. McCaffrey was hurrying to link up with Peay's 101st, cut Highway 8, and then turn east to attack the Republican Guard...

As dawn broke, Rhame's 1st Mechanized Infantry Division cleared lanes through the minefields and, instead of sending troops to clear the trenches of Iraqi soldiers, Rhame sent bulldozers to plow over the trench line, entombing any Iraqis who resisted or were too slow to surrender.

The armored bulldozers were not a novel killing machine. They were used in both World War II and Vietnam for the same purpose. Nor were they more brutal than the pounding the Iraqi front lines took from artillery, tons of bombs, fuel-air explosives, and napalm used by allied forces. The divisions efforts to publicize its exploits after the war backfired when news reports said that thousands of Iraqi troops may have been buried alive. A classified log prepared by the division officers at the time, however, put the number of Iraqis buried at 150, and after the war, the Iraqis managed to unearth only several dozen bodies...

On the morning of 27 February, Barry McCaffrey flew to Jalibah airfield to meet with his commanders. Located 30 miles south of Highway 8, the east-west road that ran to Basra, Jalibah had been one of Iraq's main airfields during the war. But now it was pockmarked with the burned and twisted wreckage of Iraqi MiG-29s and other fighters that McCaffrey's 24th Division had blasted in a four-hour fight to seize the airfield.

After leaving his helicopter, the general made his way over to Col. Paul Kern, the commander of the division's 2nd brigade. Kern had deployed his command post–two M-577 armored personnel carriers full of communications equipment–within a protective cordon of M1 tanks and Bradley fighting vehicles, which guarded the perimeter of the airfield.

No general was more aggressive than McCaffrey. He had been badly wounded in Vietnam, but it had not shaken his confidence or his ardor for battle. Unlike the VII Corps planners, McCaffrey was not in awe of the Iraqis. Dug into their fighting holes and with no air force to protect them, the Iraqi army was like a bunch of 'tethered goats,' McCaffrey recalled after the war.

Schwarzkopf had a soft spot for the general, who commanded his old unit. Just before McCaffrey's division moved to its attack positions in the Saudi desert, Schwarzkopf flew up to give a pep talk to one of the division's reconnaissance teams. Before returning to his helicopter, Schwarzkopf grabbed McCaffrey by his uniform. With tears welling in his eyes, the commander said to McCaffrey that once the ground war started, there would be no stopping until the Army had destroyed the Republican Guard. President (George H. W.) Bush has assured Schwarzkopf of that. That moment was chiseled in McCaffrey's memory.

When it came time to launch the ground war, McCaffrey issued a top secret attack order that seemed like a call to a holy war and alluded to the assurance he had received from Schwarzkopf. "Soldiers of the Victory Division–we now begin a great battle to destroy an aggressor army and free two million Kuwaiti people," the order read. "We will fight under the American flag and with the authority of the United Nations. By force of arms, we will make the Iraqi war machine surrender the country they hold prisoner. There will be no turning back when we attack into battle."

A subsequent Rand Corporation report, "Technology's Child: Schwarzkopf and Operation Desert Storm," further described the battle plan:

Since Saddam had most of his forces in southern Kuwait and along the Gulf coast to the east, the ground plan called for moving VII Corps several hundred miles in a wide arc to the west, and attacking through Iraq to hit the Republican Guard. It would amount to a gigantic left hook. Massive, swift, crushing tank attacks were central to the plan... The idea was to force Saddam to move his hundreds of thousands of troops from dug-in positions so they could be picked-off with superior US air and ground fire... For deception, Schwarzkopf instructed XVIII Airborne Corps and VII Corps to maintain their forces in assembly areas near Kuwait, to keep Iraqi forces focused on those two avenues of approach. As soon as the air war began, the Iraqis would be pinned down and both corps would shift laterally several hundred miles to the west without interference... The ground war lasted just 100 hours before President Bush, in consultation with his military commanders, called a halt. Of 42 Iraqi divisions in the theater at the beginning of the war, 27 were destroyed and an additional six were rendered combat-ineffective. However, (more than) half the Republican Guard, including the nearly intact Hammurabi Division, escaped the enveloping "left hook," leaving a legacy of controversy about whether General Frederick Franks' VII Corps had moved quickly enough. When the Iraqis finally fled from Kuwait, they jammed the road north out of the city with vehicles and booty, which the coalition air power then blocked and savaged. The vivid descriptions of the resulting carnage were probably a significant factor in the decision to halt military operations., extensively quoting from It Doesn't Take A Hero, the autobiography of General Schwarzkopf with Peter Petre.

Describing the "left hook" battle plan and its aftermath, Schwarzkopf and Petre wrote, "General McCaffrey's mission was to leapfrog his units 300 miles (480 km) north and to occupy an 80-mile-by-60-mile zone with the Marines digging in around Al Jubayl. General J. H. Binford Peay III was to establish bases along McCaffrey's left flank, from which his helicopters and troops could defend a 100-mile arc of desert to the north and west. A brigade of the 101st would also serve temporarily as a screen, ranging forward of the U.S. positions to detect, delay, and disrupt any enemy attack. Eventually, Colonel Doug Starr's 3rd Armored Cavalry Regiment would arrive to take over that mission... On Saturday morning, 2 March 1991, two days after the shooting supposedly had stopped, I came into the war room (in Riyadh) to discover that we'd just fought a major battle in the Euphrates valley. Evidently, two battalions of the Republican Guard had gotten tired of waiting to cross the pontoon bridge at Basra the night before and had headed west on Highway 8. Twice, they'd encountered Bradley Fighting Vehicles operating as scouts for the 24th Mech(anized Division, under McCaffrey's command) and both times had opened fire with antitank missiles. At dawn, they'd run into a U.S. blocking position and had opened fire again. McCaffrey had replied with a full-scale tank and helicopter counterattack, smashing the Iraqi column and taking 3,000 prisoners without suffering a single casualty. To me, this wasn't altogether bad news: the Republican Guard had shown characteristic arrogance by spotting what looked like a weak U.S. force–not suspecting that an entire U.S. Army division was in the way–and deciding, "Let's shoot 'em up." I was glad that the President's cease-fire statement had reserved our forces the right to shoot back if attacked. Yet the incident underscored the urgency of setting cease-fire terms that would definitively separate the two sides."

On 27 February 1991, C-SPAN documented the terms of President George H. W. Bush's cease-fire statement, including the terms of engagement:

With the remarks, "Kuwait is liberated. Iraq's army has been defeated," President Bush began his announcement to the nation on the U.S. and coalition forces' victory in the Persian Gulf war. He cautioned against euphoria, but urged the nation to continue their support for the U.S. armed forces serving in the Middle East. He called for Iraq to release all coalition forces' P.O.W.'s and to comply with all United Nations resolutions concerning Kuwait. President Bush also announced a conditional cease-fire to take place at midnight, E.S.T., which is 8:00 A.M. Iraqi time. The cease-fire would allow Iraqi forces to return to Iraq from Kuwait as long as they did not fire upon coalition forces.

In a paper entitled "Detecting Massed Troops with the French SPOT Satellites: A Feasibility Study for Cooperative Monitoring," Vipin Gupta of Sandia National Laboratories and LTC George Harris, Commander, 250th Military Intelligence Battalion, extensively described and illustrated pre-battle and post-battle satellite images:

- "The forward deployment positions and attack maneuvers of the coalition ground forces" (a map from McCaffrey's post-battle report, "24th Infantry Division Ground Operations")
- "Deployment of the 24th Mechanized Infantry Division from its forward assembly area at As Sarrar to its pre-attack position at Nisab. 75% of the division's tentage was left behind at As Sarrar in order to enhance the division's attack mobility... (and) the role the 24th played in the left hook maneuver" (also from McCaffrey's report)
- "Features identified in the 20 August 1990 SPOT image along the Saudi-Iraqi border near the towns of Nisab and Ash Shubah. The image was acquired three weeks after Iraq invaded Kuwait when no coalition forces were present in this area."
- "Features identified in the 29 January 1991 SPOT image covering the same ground area... acquired one day after the US 24th Mechanized Infantry Division completed its deployment into the area"
- "20 August 1990 SPOT image around Ash Shubah town... (the) enhanced image clearly shows the town, Tapline Road, and oil pipeline. It also shows most of the Bedouin trails"
- "Enlargement of 29 January 1991 SPOT image around Ash Shubah town. Acquired two weeks after the initiation of Operation Desert Storm, the image shows numerous new encampments west of Ash Shubah as well as several single pixel features which were inferred to be small tents and vehicles. The enlargement also shows a new primary supply route and bypass road. The inset is a map section from the historical archives that show the specific units that were deployed near Ash Shubah"
- "Enlargement of 29 January 1991 SPOT image showing two fan shaped features in the open desert. Based on the layout and the trail patterns, the features were identified as firing ranges for mechanized units. The image shows the entrance at the central hub, the firing stations, and the direction of fire. The larger range could accommodate a mechanized company and the smaller range could accommodate a mechanized platoon"
- "Enlargement of 29 January 1991 SPOT image showing linear traces next to a north-south trail. The trace configuration is consistent with the appearance of vehicle lines positioned close together for protection, line-of-sight communication, and possible forward attack advancement"

The paper concluded, "The positive identification of troop positions was facilitated by the dramatic appearance of numerous secured encampments and the sudden disappearance of normal civilian traffic... The observation of the new, redundant trail network further suggested that the new inhabitants in the area were indeed military forces... After these forces were found, more detailed analysis revealed the logistical areas, training grounds, and troop positions. Each feature was identified from its topographic location, layout, configuration, and associated level of activity."

On 13 November 1993, CDR Daniel S. Zazworsky, USN, wrote an unclassified analysis of the "left hook" attack, saying, "Major General McCaffrey, commander of the 24th Infantry Division (Mech), also recognized the importance of capturing enemy resources for his own forces use. On the leading edge of the left hook envelopment, he was bringing enough fuel with him in a huge logistics tail behind him. But he was hauling most of it in HEMTTs (heavy expanded-mobility tactical trucks) which themselves required huge amounts of fuel and, therefore, ordered his artillery gunners not to shoot Iraqi tank trucks or POL dumps or gas stations along the road. He told them 'We just might need the fuel too, and anyone who blows it up will answer to me.' While there is certainly utility in capturing enemy resources, the brevity of the war left it unclear whether or not LTGEN William G. Pagonis' and General McCaffrey's efforts would have been sufficient to enable the US to conduct a significantly prolonged offensive. Nor is it clear how useful enemy munitions and other equipment would have been. Perhaps General McCaffrey and Colonel Paul Kern, commander of 2nd Brigade, gave us a hint to the answer to that question. Within hours of locating a huge Iraqi stockpile of fuel-air bombs at Jalibah airfield inside Iraq, Kern had them destroyed. Later, McCaffrey indicated that it would take a week to destroy all the ammunition dumps and military supplies around the airfield... Destroying captured enemy munitions conveys the message that they were either not needed...or not wanted. Lt. Colonel Dave Oberthaler, Logistics Staff Officer with the 24th Infantry Division (Mech) in the KTO (Kuwaiti Theater of Operations), also raises a valid concern with regard to captured Iraq fuel, food and drink–indicating that fear of contamination would have kept U.S. forces from using them. He also points out another problem with relying on captured enemy equipment. Often the destruction of that enemy equipment is a high priority. For example, captured Iraqi transportation equipment (primarily HEMTTs), would have been very useful to U.S. ground forces. However, these units were also a top priority target for the coalition air forces."

=== Allegations of war crimes ===
In an opinion column published on 22 May 2000, in The New Yorker entitled "Annals of War: Overwhelming Force," Seymour Hersh wrote that McCaffrey, whose pre–1991 record he praised extensively, may according to an unnamed source have commanded his troops to kill retreating Iraq soldiers after the ceasefire had been declared and then failed to properly investigate reports of killings of unarmed persons and an alleged massacre of hundreds of Iraqi POWs. Hersh's column quoted "senior officers decrying the lack of discipline and proportionality in the McCaffrey-ordered attack." One colonel told Hersh that it "made no sense for a defeated army to invite their own death... It came across as shooting fish in a barrel. Everyone was incredulous."

In the same issue of New Yorker, its editor-in-chief David Remnick wrote an editorial supporting Hersh's research and conclusions. Remnick wrote, "In Iraq, General McCaffrey led the 24th Infantry Division in an epic 'left hook' tank drive, designed to shut off an Iraqi retreat from Kuwait. He and his troops won extraordinary praise for a four-day march under bleak conditions. Hersh, however, in the course of conducting hundreds of interviews and reviewing thousands of pages of government and Army documents, found a number of operations by men under McCaffrey's command that are, at a minimum, unsettling. His detailed account, published here this week, describes how, on 2 March 1991—two days after the declaration of a ceasefire, when Iraqi forces were in flight—McCaffrey attacked a line of retreating Iraqi vehicles and troops, unleashing an assault that lasted several hours and was all but uncontested. In testimony before the Senate and in written answers to questions from Hersh, whose repeated requests for an interview were declined, McCaffrey said that his men were fired on and he had no choice but to respond in force—with the full might of his division."

Remnick continued, "Many military men have supported General McCaffrey's version of events, but many officers and enlisted men who have talked to Hersh for the record say either that there was no Iraqi fire at all or that there was so little, and of such minor consequence, that it hardly warranted the onslaught–and bloodshed–that followed. The question is one of proportionality: Did an Army general, who is now, as it happens, in the President's Cabinet, go too far?"

Subsequently, an Army investigation cleared McCaffrey of any wrongdoing. Hersh dismissed the findings of the investigation, writing that "few soldiers report crimes, because they don't want to jeopardize their Army careers." Hersh describes his interview with Private First Class Charles Sheehan-Miles, who later published a novel about his experience in the Gulf: "When I asked Sheehan-Miles why he fired, he replied, 'At that point, we were shooting everything. Guys in the company told me later that some were civilians. It wasn't like they came at us with a gun. It was that they were there—'in the wrong place at the wrong time.' Although Sheehan-Miles is unsure whether he and his fellow-tankers were ever actually fired upon during the war, he is sure that there was no significant enemy fire: 'We took some incoming once, but it was friendly fire,' he said. 'The folks we fought never had a chance.' He came away from Iraq convinced that he and his fellow-soldiers were, as another tanker put it, part of 'the biggest firing squad in history.'"

=== McCaffrey's and Colin Powell's rebuttals to war crimes allegations ===
McCaffrey denied the charges that on three occasions, he or his men of the 24th infantry division either fired on enemy soldiers who had surrendered in an "unprovoked attack," or "went too far" in responding to a non-existent threat. He attacked what he called Hersh's "revisionist history" of the Gulf War. BBC reported that "General McCaffrey said an army investigation had previously cleared him of any blame, and he accused the New Yorker of maligning young soldiers... White House spokesman Joe Lockhart said President Bill Clinton felt the charges were unsubstantiated."

According to Georgie Anne Geyer of the Chicago Tribune from May 2000, Hersh's accusations were disputed by a number of military personnel, who later claimed to have been misquoted by the journalist. She argues that this may have been Hersh's misguided attempt to break another My Lai story, and that he "could not possibly like a man such as McCaffrey, who is so temperamentally and philosophically different from him." Finally, she suggests that Hersh may also have been motivated to attack the general for McCaffrey's role as the drug czar.

Hersh also alleged that McCaffrey violated Department of Defense policy by denying reporters access to his battle plans and the actual battleground. In fact, however, McCaffrey welcomed famed war correspondent Joseph L. Galloway. On May 26, 2006, Knight Ridder Washington, D.C. bureau chief John Walcott, honored Galloway, saying, "Mike Ruby, Merrill McLoughlin, and I sent Joe (Galloway) to Schwarzkopf's headquarters in Riyadh with the kind of simple request that editors like to make: Go get the best seat in the war.... General Schwarzkopf sent Joe to Maj. Gen. Barry McCaffrey's 24th Infantry Division (Mechanized), which he said had the most complex and dangerous assignment in his battle plan, the famous left hook. Almost as soon as he arrived at division headquarters, Joe was ushered into the TOC, the Tactical Operations Center. The cover was lifted off the division's battle maps, which of course were Top Secret-and-change.... Joe asked General McCaffrey why he could see the secret battle plan. 'I trust you because Norm trusts you,' Barry replied, 'but most of all, I trust you because you're coming with us.'"

Lieutenant General Steven Arnold, interviewed by Hersh for the article, was one of the officers who later claimed to have been misquoted. He wrote to the editor of the New Yorker, saying, "I know that my brief comments in the article were not depicted in an entirely accurate manner and were taken out of context.... When the Iraqi forces fired on elements of the 24th Infantry Division, they were clearly committing a hostile act. I regret having granted an interview with Mr. Hersh. The tone and thrust of the article places me in a position of not trusting or respecting General Barry McCaffrey, and nothing could be further from the truth."

Similar criticism of Hersh's allegations came from General Colin Powell, Chairman of the Joint Chiefs of Staff during the Iraq War. In a May 2000 interview with Sam Donaldson for the television news program This Week, Powell described the Hersh article as "attempted character assassination on General McCaffrey."

On 22 May 2000, the New Yorker discussed Hersh's allegations, as did Newsweek on 29 May 2000. "Five-Hour Air, Armor Assault—The March 2 attack on the Iraqi Republican Guard 'Hammurabi' tank division is ordered by Army General Barry McCaffrey (the general who commanded the already-famous 'left hook' maneuver days before—see 23 February 1991 and After), in response to what McCaffrey says is an attack on his forces with rocket-propelled grenades (RPGs). The decision surprises some in the Allied command structure in Saudi Arabia and causes unease among civilian and military leaders in Washington, who worry about the public relations ramifications of an attack that comes days after a cease-fire was implemented (see 28 February 1991). McCaffrey himself later calls the attack 'one of the most astounding scenes of destruction I have ever participated in.' The 'Hammurabi' division is obliterated in the assault."

=== Military career after the Gulf War ===
McCaffrey's last command in the army was United States Southern Command (SOUTHCOM), the unified command responsible for United States military activities in Central America and South America. He commanded SOUTHCOM, whose headquarters were then in the Republic of Panama, from 1994 to 1996. Besides managing military personnel, as part of his duties in Panama, McCaffrey supported humanitarian operations for over 10,000 Cuban refugees as part of Operation Safe Haven from 8 September 1994 – 15 March 1995 at Empire Range, Panama. It was also during his last military position that he created the first Human Rights Council and Human Rights Code of Conduct for U.S. Military Joint Command. He wrote in August 1995 in "Human Rights and the Commander" in Joint Force Quarterly, "There is a common assumption that respect for an enemy's soldiers and its civilian populace can stand in the way of a successful military campaign. Instead, respect for human rights increases the efficacy of security forces, both military and law enforcement."

McCaffrey was the youngest and most highly decorated four-star general in the army at the time of his retirement from the military in 1996.

On 1 June 1996, at the commencement ceremony at the United States Military Academy, Secretary of Defense William Perry commended McCaffrey's performance during the Gulf War. Perry said, "Whatever else is required of you in your Army career, you will first of all need to be a warrior. And you could find no better role model than Barry McCaffrey. Barry became one of America's greatest warriors. He led forces into combat in Vietnam, where he was grievously wounded. In Desert Storm, General McCaffrey's 24th Infantry Division led the famous left hook that caught the Iraqi army by surprise, and led America to one of its most convincing battlefield victories ever. He then went to SOUTHCOM at a crucial time and seized the opportunities presented by the ascendancy of democracy in our hemisphere. General McCaffery's attributes as a warrior–guts, brains and tenacity–are key to success on today's battlefield. Now he is putting those same skills to work as a civilian, leading America's war against drugs."

On 17 February 2003, Mark Mazzetti and Kevin Whitelaw, in an article entitled "Six Deadly Fears: The U.S. military is confident of victory in Iraq–but at what price?" in U.S. News & World Report, quoted McCaffrey, "whose 24th Mechanized Infantry Division helped execute the famous 'left hook' attack against an Iraqi Army stronger than today's in Operation Desert Storm, puts it this way: "The Iraqis have no good military options. There is no technique, no tool that they can now adopt that will have any military significance on the outcome of the conflict... Most likely, Saddam would use artillery-delivered mustard gas and nerve agents against U.S. ground elements advancing on Baghdad. If so, says McCaffrey, 'it's going to create conditions of abject misery, but it will have no impact on the pace of the operation.'"

== ONDCP Director ==
Barry McCaffrey was director of Office of National Drug Control Policy (ONDCP) under President Bill Clinton from 1996 to 2001. He was confirmed unanimously by the U.S. Senate on 29 February 1996. As director of ONDCP, McCaffrey sat in President Clinton's Cabinet.

McCaffrey came to this position with experience interdicting drug smugglers from South America, as head of the Southern Command. He disliked the metaphor of a "war" on drugs, preferring to call it a malignancy for which he advocated treatment; at the same time, he also headed an initiative that began in 1999 to eliminate coca farming in Colombia.

As director of ONDCP, McCaffrey wrote and published the first "National Drug Control Strategy". The book-length white paper proposed a comprehensive 10-year plan; profiled drug abusers and trends in youth drug abuse; listed health consequences; estimated the cost of drug-related crime; recognized that illegal drugs remain widely available; presented strategic goals and objectives for demand and supply reduction and measures of effectiveness; and proposed a comprehensive approach including initiatives aimed at youth and initiatives to reduce drug-related crime and violence, to reduce health and social problems, to shield U.S. frontiers, and to reduce drug availability; and asked for resources to implement the strategy.

=== Paid anti-drug messages in TV programs ===
During McCaffrey's tenure, ONDCP implemented a policy of buying paid anti-drug advertising on television and also paying television producers to embed anti-drug messages into major television programs. WB network's senior vice president for broadcast standards Rick Mater acknowledged, "The White House did view scripts. They did sign off on them–they read scripts, yes." Running the campaign for the ONDCP was Alan Levitt, who estimated that between 1998 and 2000 the networks received nearly $25 million in benefits. One example was with Warner Brothers' show, Smart Guy. The original script portrayed two young people using drugs at a party. Originally depicted as cool and popular, after input from the drug office, "We showed that they were losers and put them [hidden away to indulge in shamed secrecy] in a utility room. That was not in the original script." Other shows including ER, Beverly Hills, 90210, Chicago Hope, The Drew Carey Show, and 7th Heaven also put anti-drug messages into their stories.

Details about the program were published by Salon on 13 January 2000. McCaffrey defended the program saying, "We plead guilty to using every lawful means to save America's children"; President Clinton defended McCaffrey. Clinton said on 14 January, "[I]t's my understanding that there's nothing mandatory about this, that there was no attempt to regulate content, or tell people what they had to put into it–of course, I wouldn't support that." McCaffrey opposed efforts in Congress to extend the national anti-drug media campaign to include messages against underage drinking.

== Comments on the War on Terror and the Iraq War ==
McCaffrey has harshly criticized U.S. treatment of detainees during the war on terror. According to McCaffrey: "We should never, as a policy, maltreat people under our control, detainees. We tortured people unmercifully. We probably murdered dozens of them during the course of that, both the armed forces and the CIA." He "supports an investigation of the government lawyers who knowingly advocated illegal torture, and he specifically cited Bush's White House counsel and attorney general in the same discussion, emphasizing that 'we better find out how we went so wrong.'"

In June 2005, McCaffrey surveyed Iraq on behalf of U.S. Central Command and wrote an optimistic report afterwards. In the report, McCaffrey described U.S. senior military leadership team as superb and predicted the insurgency will reach its peak from January-to-September 2006, allowing for U.S. force withdrawals in the late summer of 2006. A year later, however, after visiting Iraq again, his assessment was grim: "Iraq is abject misery... I think it's a terribly dangerous place for diplomats and journalists and contractors and Iraqi mothers. Trying to go about daily life in that city is a real nightmare for these poor people." He called Abu Ghraib "the biggest mistake that happened so far." In an official memorandum, McCaffrey nevertheless expressed optimism about the operation's longer-term future:

The situation is perilous, uncertain, and extreme–but far from hopeless. The U.S. Armed Forces are a rock. This is the most competent and brilliantly led military in a tactical and operational sense that we have ever fielded... There is no reason why the U.S. cannot achieve our objectives in Iraq. Our aim must be to create a viable federal state under the rule of law which does not: enslave its own people, threaten its neighbors, or produce weapons of mass destruction. This is a 10-year task. We should be able to draw down most of our combat forces in 3–5 years. We have few alternatives to the current U.S. strategy, which is painfully but gradually succeeding. This is now a race against time. Do we have the political will, do we have the military power, will we spend the resources required to achieve our aims?

His assessment noted several negative areas as well as very positive areas in the struggle for democracy in the country. McCaffrey returned a third time in March 2007 and followed the visit with a third memorandum. The grimness of the 2006 assessment was repeated, additionally asserting a concern about the effect of the continuing war on the readiness of the small-sized U.S. military. He tempered his optimism about the future, saying, "There are encouraging signs that the peace and participation message does resonate with many of the more moderate Sunni and Shia warring factions."

=== Other military analysis ===
In April 2008, The New York Times published a front-page report by David Barstow confirming that military analysts hired by ABC, CBS and NBC to present observations about the conduct of the war in Iraq had undisclosed ties to the Pentagon and/or military contractors. McCaffrey was "at the heart of the scandal" detailed by Barstow. In late November 2008, The New York Times published another front-page article by Barstow, this time specifically profiling General McCaffrey. It detailed his free movement between roles as a paid advocate for defense companies, media analyst and a retired officer. An earlier report with some of the same information had appeared in The Nation in April 2003 but was not widely picked up. Specifically, McCaffrey signed a contract with an undisclosed equity stake and retainer to represent Defense Solutions to U.S. military leadership. Within days after signing the contract, McCaffrey sent a proposal directly to David Petraeus, then the commanding general in Iraq, recommending Defense Solutions and its offer to supply Iraq 5,000 armored vehicles from former Soviet bloc countries. Subsequently, McCaffrey would continue to advocate the Defense Solutions proposal over equipping the Iraqi Army with U.S.-made equipment. McCaffrey and his consulting firm BR McCaffrey Associates LLC responded to The Times piece, stating that he is "absolutely committed to objective, non-partisan public commentary." The response highlighted his military record, as well as his history of criticizing the execution of the Iraq War and specifically Rumsfeld. Journalist Glenn Greenwald later wrote that there had been "extensive collaboration between NBC and McCaffrey to formulate a coordinated response to David Barstow's story."

On 24 January 2009, in an article entitled "The Generals' Second Careers," The New York Times Public Editor (ombudsman) Clark Hoyt discussed Barstow's allegations. He wrote,

The Times's [first] report [was] a 7,500-word article, 20 photographs and 5 graphics. Nine photos of retired officers talking on television—four of them on NBC or MSNBC—dominated the front page. They included the most celebrated of all military analysts, Barry R. McCaffrey, the retired Army four-star general who just happened to be the man excluded from the Pentagon's information program for criticizing Donald Rumsfeld's management of the Iraq war. [...] The article barely mentioned McCaffrey and another NBC analyst, Gen. Wayne Downing, who died in 2007, yet included them in what a reader could reasonably interpret as a virtual rogue's gallery of analysts spouting the Pentagon line.

On Nov. 30, under the [second] front-page headline "One Man's Military-Industrial-Media Complex," Barstow wrote that McCaffrey represented an exclusive club of mostly retired generals whose "war commentary can fit hand in glove with undisclosed commercial interests[.]"

[...]

Barstow said he never intended to say that McCaffrey did anything illegal or unethical. He said he was describing how the world works and raising the issue of disclosure of potential conflicts.

[...]

McCaffrey, a much-decorated, thrice-wounded war hero, unhappily became the symbol of an entrenched system of insider access, overlapping interests and lack of public disclosure. It is an issue of high interest in Barack Obama's Washington. Even as they testified to McCaffrey's integrity, some of his most ardent supporters recognized that the system presented multiple opportunities for conflicts of interest. [...] McCaffrey said he will follow any disclosure rules, as long as they apply to everybody, not just retired military officers.

== Criticism of Donald Trump ==
On 16 March 2018, McCaffrey received significant media attention after sending out a message on Twitter announcing his conclusion that US President Donald Trump was a threat to national security and "under the sway of" Russian Federation President Vladimir Putin. McCaffrey specifically cited Trump's tepid response to United Kingdom Prime Minister Theresa May's announcement that the Russian government was behind an alleged nerve gas attack on 4 March in Salisbury, England.

Reluctantly I have concluded that President Trump is a serious threat to US national security. He is refusing to protect vital US interests from active Russian attacks. It is apparent that he is for some unknown reason under the sway of Mr Putin.

== Post-government work ==
After McCaffrey retired from government service in 2001, he continued to provide his expertise to a wide spectrum of clients. He is currently a military analyst for NBC and MSNBC, and president of his own consulting firm, BR McCaffrey Associates.

In October 2004, McCaffrey was elected by the board of directors of HNTB Corporation to serve as the board chairman of a newly formed subordinate company, HNTB Federal Services. In January 2008, McCaffrey was elected to the board of directors of The HNTB Companies, an employee-owned organization of infrastructure firms known for their work in transportation, tolls, bridges, aviation, rail, architecture, urban design, and planning.

McCaffrey also serves on the boards of directors of Atlantic Council of the United States, DynCorp International, Global Linguist Solutions, McNeil Technologies, and CRC Health Group, a nationwide for-profit chain of addiction treatment centers and behavioral therapy programs for related disorders.

He is also an honorary advisor of Smart Approaches to Marijuana, member of Council on Foreign Relations, an Associate of the Inter-American Dialogue, a principal for Council on Excellence in Government, a member of the CSIS U.S.-Mexico Binational Council, chairman of Vietnam Veterans Memorial Education Center Advisory Board, a senior executive associate for Army Aviation Association of America, and a member of the board of advisors of National Infantry Foundation. McCaffrey also participates in U.S. Army Fires Center, Senior Field Artillery Advisory Council, at Fort Sill, Oklahoma.

McCaffrey is an advocate for parity (coverage by health insurers of behavioral disorders coequal to their coverage of other diseases) and of drug courts and veterans' courts and is a frequent speaker at conferences.

== Personal life ==
McCaffrey is married to Jill Ann Faulkner. They have three children: Sean, Tara, and Amy; they also have three grandchildren. Their son, Colonel Sean McCaffrey, retired from the Armed Forces after his third combat tour.

== Honors and awards ==

Badge	Combat Infantryman Badge		
Badge	Army Parachutist Badge		
1st row		Distinguished Service Cross, with 1 bronze oak leaf cluster	
2nd row	Defense Distinguished Service Medal, with 1 bronze oak leaf cluster	Army Distinguished Service Medal, with 1 bronze oak leaf clusters	Silver Star, with 1 bronze oak leaf clusters
3rd row	Defense Superior Service Medal	Legion of Merit	Bronze Star, with "V" device and 3 bronze oak leaf clusters
4th row	Purple Heart, with 2 bronze oak leaf clusters	Meritorious Service Medal	Air Medal, with award numerals 2
5th row	Army Commendation Medal, with 3 bronze oak leaf clusters	National Defense Service Medal, with 1 bronze service star	Armed Forces Expeditionary Medal
6th row	Vietnam Service Medal with 4 bronze campaign stars	Southwest Asia Service Medal with 2 bronze campaign stars	Army Service Ribbon
7th row	Army Overseas Service Ribbon, with award numeral 2	South Vietnamese Cross of Gallantry with 3 bronze stars	South Vietnamese Armed Forces Honor Medal (1st class)
8th row	South Vietnamese Campaign Medal	Saudi Arabian Kuwait Liberation Medal	Kuwaiti Kuwait Liberation Medal

1st row	Army Presidential Unit Citation, with 1 bronze oak leaf cluster		Valorous Unit Award
2nd row	U.S. Army Meritorious Unit Commendation	South Vietnamese Gallantry Cross Unit Citation	South Vietnamese Civil Actions Unit Citation

- State Department Superior Honor Award, 1992, as member of principal negotiation team for the START II Nuclear Arms Control Treaty
- 27 August 2002—Keynote speaker at the 2002 Innovative Government Forum (IGF) in Sacramento, California
- 6 May 2003 – "Barry McCaffrey; Excerpts from a Monitor Breakfast on the Long-Term Impact of the Iraq War, interviewed by David T. Cook for The Christian Science Monitor
- 2004 – James Cardinal Gibbons Medal (Highest Honor), The Catholic University of America, awarded to honor any person who, in the opinion of the CUA Alumni Association's Board of Governors, has rendered distinguished and meritorious service to the Roman Catholic Church, the United States of America, or The Catholic University of America.
- 18 December 2008 – "Four-Star Gen. McCaffrey Given Key to City by Dearborn, MI Mayor O'Reilly"—reported by Channel 9, WAFB Detroit
- 12 February 2009 – "Transition to Power: Challenges Facing the New Administration Presentation to National Defense Industrial Association's Special Operations and Low Intensity Conflict 20th Annual Symposium & Exhibition"—presentation by Gen. McCaffrey
- 2010 – Government Security News Extraordinary Leadership and Service in Homeland Security Award
- 2010 Distinguished Graduate Award, West Point Association of Graduates of the United States Military Academy
- March 2012—General (Ret.) Alexander M. Haig Jr. Guardian of Liberty Award from West Point Society of Philadelphia
- 13 June 2012 – General McCaffrey was awarded the Martin and Toby Adler Distinguished Service Award in Palm Springs, CA from the College on Problems of Drug Dependence.
- Honored Guest at West Point Society of New York 2012 Founder's Day Celebration Dinner
- United States Military Academy West Point Notable Graduates
- Covered extensively in Shirley Ann Warshaw's book Presidential Profiles: The Clinton Years
- Honorary Companion of the District of Columbia Commandery of the Military Order of Foreign Wars
- MBA Veterans Leadership Award 2018 – Foster School of Business at the University of Washington

Military offices
Preceded by George Joulwan	Combatant Commander of United States Southern Command; 1994–1996	Succeeded by Wesley Clark
Political offices
Preceded by Lee Brown	Director of the Office of National Drug Control Policy; 1996–2001	Succeeded by Ed Jurith; Acting
