= Ecstasy Rising =

- Starring: Peter Jennings
- Country of origin: United States
- Original language: English

Production
- Producer: ABC News
- Running time: 42 minutes

Original release
- Release: April 1, 2004

Ecstasy Rising is an ABC News television documentary with Peter Jennings on the history of MDMA (3,4-methylenedioxy-N-methylamphetamine) also known as ecstasy. It includes a short history of the drug and criticizes the negative health claims made by the U.S. government.

== See also ==
- Methylenedioxymethamphetamine
- Alexander Shulgin
- Psychedelic therapy
- RAVE Act
- National Institute on Drug Abuse (NIDA)
- Drug Enforcement Administration (DEA)
- Retracted article on neurotoxicity of ecstasy
- Multidisciplinary Association for Psychedelic Studies (MAPS) Non-profit research and educational organization
- Rolling Movie
