= Una D. McCann =

Psychiatrist and researcher

Una Deirde McCann
- Born: 1958 (age 67–68)
- Citizenship: American
- Spouse: George A. Ricaurte
- Scientific career
- Education: Princeton University (BS); Duke University School of Medicine (MD)
- Title: Director Anxiety Disorders Program Associate Program Director JHBMC GCRC Professor of Psychiatry and Behavioral Sciences Professor of Neurology
- Awards: Phi Beta Kappa Society (1980) Sigma Xi Award in Psychology (1980) U.S. Army Commissioned Officers Award (1995)
- Fields: Psychiatry
- Institutions: Johns Hopkins School of Medicine and Johns Hopkins Bayview Medical Center

Una D. McCann (born 1958) is a board certified psychiatrist and researcher at Johns Hopkins School of Medicine in the Department of Psychiatry. She is also the Director of the Anxiety Disorders Program, and Co-Director of the Center for Interdisciplinary Sleep Medicine and Research, and Associate Program Director at the Johns Hopkins Bayview Medical Center. McCann is considered to be an expert in anxiety and stress disorders and her primary areas research revolves around amphetamine-induced monoamine neurotoxicity and neurobiology of anxiety disorders.

== Education ==
McCann graduated from Princeton University in 1980 with a Bachelors of Science while on a four year academic scholarship. After graduating, McCann went on to attended Duke University school of Medicine in 1984 and completed residency at Stanford University School of Medicine and Walter Reed Army Medical Center in 1988. In 1985, she became board certified in California and in 1990 in Maryland.

== Career ==
Prior to working at Johns Hopkins School of Medicine, McCann was a psychiatrist at Walter Reed Army Medical Center and was Chief of the Unit on Anxiety at the National Institute of Mental Health at the NIH. Currently she is a practicing physician, professor of Neurology and Psychiatry, and holds many executive roles within Johns Hopkins School of Medicine and at Johns Hopkins Bayview Medical Center. She is an editorial board member of the Journal of Women’s Health and Gender Based Medicine, Women in Medicine, Adicciones, Journal of Addiction, Journal of Sleep Disorders: Treatment and Care, WebmedCentral Plus, and Psychotherapy and Psychological Disorders and also holds a membership with the Society for Neuroscience, since 1988.

=== MDMA research ===
McCann has written many research articles studying the effects of MDMA, including adverse reactions of MDMA and how it leads to serotonin neuron damage. She and her husband, fellow Johns Hopkins Professor and Physician George A. Ricaurte, have also linked abnormalities such as altered sleep, neuroendocrine function, altered behavior to 5-HT receptor drugs, and increased impulsiveness with MDMA users. In addition, she has also done research on neurotoxicity MDMA using functional magnetic resonance imaging comparing the neurocognitive capabilities of MDMA users and nonusers, as studies on animals using MDMA have shown negative effects. McCann and her husband Ricaurte have had one study published in the journal Science subject to retraction. In 2002, Ricaurte's primate study of MDMA usage and brain damage did not use ecstasy and that ten squirrel monkeys and baboons were injected with overdoses of methamphetamine, instead of MDMA, resulting in two animals dying and the withdrawal of four other academic papers. Ricaurte, McCann, and other scientist involved wrote a response to the retraction addressing the errors made in their research.

=== Anxiety and stress research ===
McCann has been involved in a broad array of stress and anxiety research revolving around PTSD, depression, and traumatic brain injury. In regards to depression, McCann has worked on studying on the neuroanatomical markers of depression after traumatic brain injury through the use of diffusion tensor imaging (DTI) which measures the translational motion of water molecules and on individuals with depression after suffering from myocardial infarction. She has investigated assessing depression symptoms among patients hospitalized with acute myocardial infarction, coming to the conclusion that depression screening should be utilized in order to prevent depression among patients. She has also been involved with associating a link between heart hart and posttraumatic stress disorders with severe burn patients. McCann has investigated the association between mild traumatic brain injury and sleep disturbances through the use of sleep polysomnograms (PSG) and sleep EEG power spectra (PS), which could become a possible diagnostic marker for brain injury.

=== Psilocybin research ===
McCann has been a part of psilocybin research, a naturally occurring psychedelic drug, in partnership with other Johns Hopkins scientist, including working with Roland Griffiths, who was featured on 60 Minutes regarding the studies done. The psilocybin research has focused on the mystical experiences associated with individuals taking psilocybin for religious purpose and observing the psychological effects. McCann has also contributed to studies regarding psilocybin's use among cancer patients and healthy volunteers in two separate studies, investigating whether the use of this psychedelic increased psychological coping and decreased depression due to spirituality being associated with the two.

== Awards ==
McCann has published more than 140 peer-reviewed manuscripts and over 9,000 citations.

Her awards include:

- (1980) Phi Beta Kappa society;
- (1980) Sigma Xi Society and Sigma Xi award in Psychology;
- (1980) Howard Hughes Foundation Student Scholar;
- (1995) U.S. Army Commissioned Officers Award.
