= Gardner Lindzey =

American psychologist (1920–2008)

- Born: November 27, 1920; Wilmington, Delaware
- Died: February 4, 2008 (aged 87); Palo Alto, California
- Education: Penn State University (A.B., M.S.); Harvard University (Ph.D.)
- Known for: The Handbook of Social Psychology
- Scientific career
- Fields: Social psychology, Behavior Genetics
- Workplaces: Harvard University; Syracuse University; University of Minnesota; University of Texas
- Academic advisors: Gordon Allport
- Doctoral students: Auke Tellegen

Gardner Edmund Lindzey (November 27, 1920 – February 4, 2008) was an American psychologist and a past president of the American Psychological Association (APA). After completing a doctorate at Harvard University, Lindzey served as a professor or administrator at several universities, edited a well-known textbook in social psychology and led a 1982 National Academy of Sciences (NAS) panel that recommended the legalization of marijuana.

== Biography ==
=== Early life and education ===
Lindzey was born on November 27, 1920, in Wilmington, Delaware. He attended Penn State University, earning undergraduate and graduate degrees in psychology. In 1949, he finished a Ph.D. in psychology from Harvard University.

=== Academic career ===
After teaching briefly at Harvard and spending several years at Syracuse University, Lindzey joined the faculty of the University of Minnesota. Psychologist and fellow faculty member Elliot Aronson described Lindzey as "the star of the round table, an entertaining storyteller and a catalyst of conversation. And he seemed to know everything about everyone's research... But he would always find a way to make each person's research relevant to the interests of the other people at the table."

He chaired the psychology department at the University of Texas between 1964 and 1969. Later, the university credited him with "transforming the department from a relatively small and unassuming group to a large and internationally recognized faculty." Lindzey made contributions to personality psychology, social psychology, the history of psychology and behavioral genetics. He moved into educational administration at Texas, becoming the vice president for academic affairs and remaining there until 1975. He then became the longest-serving director of the Center for Advanced Study in the Behavioral Sciences (CASBS), running the center between 1975 and 1989 after completing fellowships there in 1954, 1964 and 1972.

In 1982, he was a key member (immediate past chair) of the NAS committee that recommended the decriminalization of marijuana in An Analysis of Marijuana Policy, a report commissioned several years earlier by the National Institute on Drug Abuse. Other committee members included psychiatrist Daniel X. Freedman, former U.S. drug czar Jerome Jaffe, sociologists Denise Kandel and Howard S. Becker, psychologist and future university and foundation president Judith Rodin, future Nobel Prize winner in economics Thomas Schelling, and former CBS president Frank Stanton. The report highlighted the costs associated with the 400,000 annual marijuana-related arrests. When the report was published, NAS president Frank Press included a cover letter with it that criticized the report. Press thought that the committee had overstepped its bounds with its conclusions, which he said were better left to the political process. National Institute on Drug Abuse director William Pollin also said that it was "a terrible mistake and a public health tragedy" to advocate for societal acceptance of marijuana use.

=== Later life ===
An athlete in high school, Lindzey continued to play tennis for several years after his retirement. He was ill for the last couple of years of his life. He spent some time in hospice care, but he was able to return to work as an editor almost up to the time that he died.

=== Personal ===
Lindzey married Andrea Lewis in 1944 and they had five children. She died in 1984. In his later years, he had a companion, a psychologist named Lyn Carlsmith.

== Honors ==
- Member, American Academy of Arts and Sciences (1971)
- Member, American Philosophical Society (1979)
- NAS Award for Scientific Reviewing, National Academy of Sciences (1987)
- Member, United States National Academy of Sciences (1989)

== Works ==
- The Handbook of Social Psychology
- Theories of Personality (1957)
- Projective Techniques and Cross-Cultural Research (1961)
