= Hispanic Scientist of the Year Award =

The Museum of Science & Industry (Tampa) honors a Hispanic scientist every year since 2001. MOSI awards a Scientist every year to provide role models for the diverse youth of the Tampa Bay area.

== 2001 ==
The 2001 honoree was Dr. Alejandro Acevedo-Gutierrez, a Marine Biologist from Mexico.

== 2002 ==
The 2002 honoree was Fernando "Frank" Caldeiro, a NASA Astronaut from Argentina.

== 2003 ==
The 2003 honoree was Dr. Mario Molina, a Nobel Laureate in Chemistry from Mexico.

== 2004 ==
Dr. Antiona Coello Novello was the 2004 honoree, and she was the U.S. Surgeon General from 1990 to 1993. She is originally from Puerto Rico.

== 2005 ==
Dr. Edmond Yunis was the 2005 honoree, and he is an Immunologist from Colombia.

== 2006 ==
The 2006 honoree was Dr. Ines Cifuentes, a Seismologist from England, Ecuador, and America.

== 2007 ==
Dr. Louis A. Martin-Vega is an Industrial Engineer from America and Puerto Rico, and he was the 2007 honoree.

== 2008 ==
The 2008 honoree was Dr. Lydia Villa-Komaroff, a Molecular Biologist from America and Mexico.

== 2009 ==
Dr. Nils Diaz, the former chair of the U.S. Nuclear Regulatory Commission, was the 2009 honoree, and he is from Cuba.

== 2010 ==
Dr. Dan Arvizu, the 2010 honoree, is the Director and Chief Executive of the U.S. Department of Energy's National Renewable Energy Laboratory, and he is from Mexico.

== 2011 ==
Dr. Cristian Samper, Director of the Smithsonian Institution's National Museum of Natural History, was the 2011 honoree, and he is from Colombia.

== 2012 ==
Dr. Nora Volkow, the Director of the National Institute on Drug Abuse (NIDA) at the National Institutes of Health, was the 2012 honoree, and she is originally from Mexico.

== 2013 ==
Dr. Raul Cuero, Inventor and Microbiologist, is the 2013 honoree, and he is from Colombia.

== 2014 ==
Dr. Rafael L. Bras, Civil Engineer, Puerto Rico. Prize expanded to include an Early Career Honoree: Dr. Ana Maria Rey, Physicist, Colombia.

== 2015 ==
Dr. Modesto Alex Maidique, Electrical Engineer, Cuba. Early Career Honoree: Dr. Miguel Morales Silva, Physicist, Puerto Rico.

== 2016 ==
Dr. Adriana Ocampo, Planetary Geologist, USA.
