= Wehmeyer =

Wehmeyer is a surname. Notable people with the surname include:

- Alfred Wehmeyer (1919–1942), German Luftwaffe ace
- Bernd Wehmeyer (born 1952), German footballer
- Berthold Wehmeyer (1925–1949), German murderer executed in West Berlin
- Lewis Edgar Wehmeyer (1897–1971), American mycologist
- Michael Wehmeyer (born 1957), American psychologist
- Peggy Wehmeyer (born 1955), American journalist
- Sharne Wehmeyer (born 1980), South African field hockey player

== See also ==
- Wehmeier
