= Peter Jennings =

American news anchor (1938–2005)

Peter Jennings CM
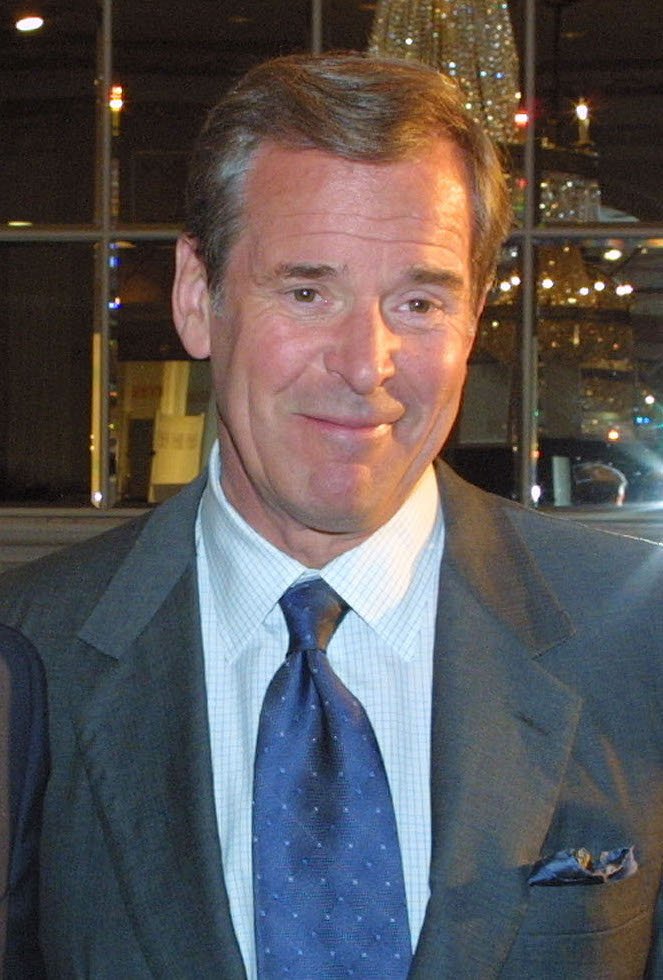
- Jennings in 2002
- Born: Peter Charles Archibald Ewart Jennings; July 29, 1938; Toronto, Ontario, Canada
- Died: August 7, 2005 (aged 67); New York City, U.S.
- Citizenship: Canada; United States (2003–2005)
- Occupation: Television journalist
- Years active: 1947–2005
- Notable credits: CTV (1961–1964); ABC Evening Report/Peter Jennings with the News (1965–1967); ABC World News Tonight Foreign Desk Anchor (1978–1983); Anchor (1983–2005); ABC News reporter (1964–2005)
- Spouses: Valerie Godsoe (m. 1963; div. 1970); Anoushka Malauf (m. 1973; div. 1979); Kati Marton (m. 1979; div. 1993); Kayce Freed (m. 1997)
- Children: 2
- Parents: Charles Jennings; Elizabeth Jennings

Peter Charles Archibald Ewart Jennings (July 29, 1938 – August 7, 2005) was a Canadian and American television journalist. He was best known for serving as the sole anchor of ABC World News Tonight from 1983 until his death from lung cancer in 2005. Despite dropping out of high school, Jennings transformed himself into one of American television's most prominent journalists.

Jennings started his career early, hosting a Canadian radio show at age 9. He began his professional career with CJOH-TV in Ottawa during its early years, anchoring the local newscasts and hosting the teen dance show Saturday Date on Saturdays and then co-anchoring the CTV Television Network's national newscast. In 1965, ABC News tapped him to anchor its flagship evening news program. Critics and others in the television news business attacked his inexperience, making his job difficult. He became a foreign correspondent in 1968, reporting from the Middle East.

Jennings returned as one of World News Tonight's three anchormen in 1978, and he was promoted to sole anchorman in 1983. He was also known for his marathon coverage of breaking news stories, staying on the air for 15 hours or more to anchor the live broadcast of events such as the Gulf War in 1991, the millennium celebrations in 1999–2000, and the September 11 attacks in 2001. In addition to anchoring, he was the host of many ABC News special reports and moderator of several American presidential debates. He was always fascinated with the United States and became an American citizen in 2003.

Along with former television anchors Tom Brokaw of NBC Nightly News and Dan Rather of CBS Evening News, Jennings was one of the "Big Three" news anchormen who dominated American evening network news from the early 1980s to the mid-2000s. Jennings's death closely followed the retirements from anchoring evening news programs of Brokaw in 2004 and Rather in 2005.

== Early life and education ==
Jennings was born on July 29, 1938, in Toronto, Ontario; he and his younger sister Sarah were children of Elizabeth (née Osborne) and Charles Jennings, a prominent radio broadcaster for the Canadian Broadcasting Corporation (CBC). Jennings started his broadcasting career at the age of nine, hosting Peter's People, a half-hour, Saturday morning, CBC Radio show for kids. His father was on a business trip to the Middle East when the show debuted; upon returning, Charles Jennings, who harbored a deep dislike of nepotism, was outraged to learn that the network had put his son on the air.

When Jennings was 11 years old, he began attending Trinity College School in Port Hope, Ontario, where he excelled in sports. After the CBC moved his father to its Ottawa headquarters in the early 1950s, Jennings transferred to Lisgar Collegiate Institute. He struggled academically, and Jennings later surmised that it was out of "pure boredom" that he failed 10th grade and dropped out. "I loved girls," he said. "I loved comic books. And for reasons I don't understand, I was pretty lazy." Jennings then briefly attended Carleton University, where he says he "lasted about 10 minutes" before dropping out. He also attended the University of Ottawa.

== Career ==
=== Beginnings in Canada ===
Although Jennings dreamed of following in his father's footsteps in broadcasting, his first job was as a bank teller for the Royal Bank of Canada. He had hoped that the company would assign him to its Havana branch; instead, it located him to the small town of Prescott, Ontario, before transferring him to its nearby Brockville branch. During this time, he explored acting by appearing in several amateur musical productions with the Orpheus Musical Theatre Society, including Damn Yankees and South Pacific.

While in Brockville, then 21-year-old Jennings started his rise in broadcasting. In 1959, CFJR, a local radio station, hired him as a member of its news department; many of his stories were picked up by the CBC. By 1961, Jennings had joined the staff of CJOH-TV, then a new television station in Ottawa. When the station launched in March 1961, Jennings was initially an interviewer and co-producer for Vue, a late-night news program. His producers saw a youthful attractiveness in him that resembled that of Dick Clark, and Jennings soon found himself hosting Club Thirteen, a dance show similar to American Bandstand.

In 1963, CTV, Canada's first private TV network and a fledgling competitor of his father's network, hired the 24-year-old Jennings as co-anchor of its late-night national newscast, CTV World News. While reporting for CTV, he was the first Canadian journalist to arrive in Dallas after the assassination of President John F. Kennedy. In 1964, CTV sent Jennings to cover the Democratic National Convention in Atlantic City, New Jersey. There, he ran into Elmer Lower, then president of ABC News, who offered him a job as a correspondent for the American network, an opportunity Jennings initially rejected. "The job was pretty intimidating for a guy like me in a tiny city in Canada," Jennings later recalled. "I thought, What if I screw up? What if I fail?" Three months later though, he changed his mind and moved to the United States.

Though he had moved to ABC, he accepted a freelance assignment narrating the documentary series The Fabulous Sixties for CTV in 1969.

=== United States' youngest anchor ===
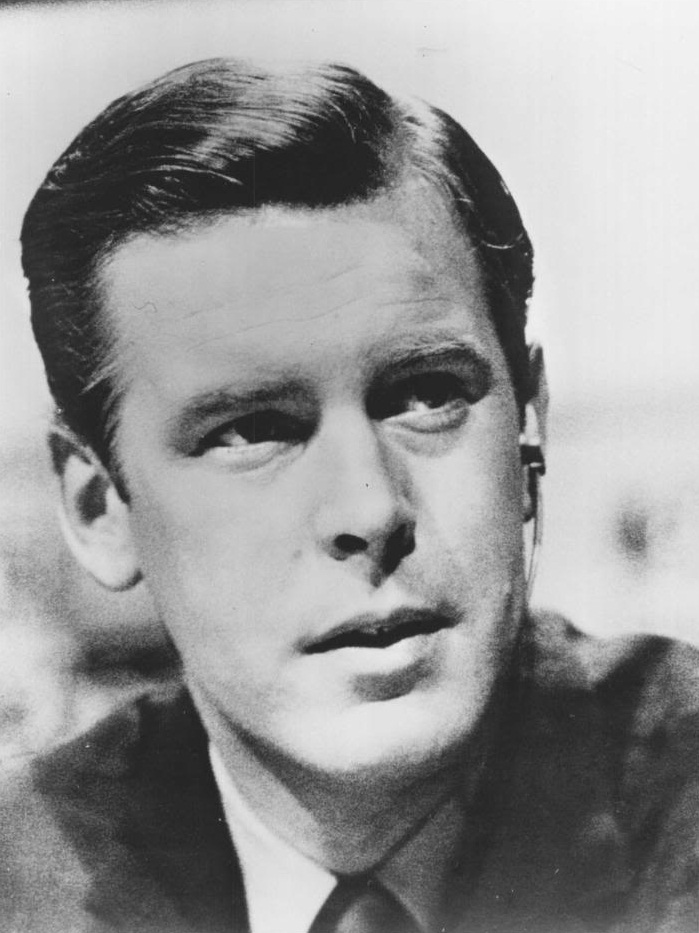
A 1968 press photo of Jennings

Jennings started reporting for ABC at its New York news bureau. At the time, ABC lagged behind the more established news divisions of NBC and CBS, and the network was trying to attract younger viewers. On February 1, 1965, ABC plucked the fresh-faced Canadian from the field and placed him at the anchor desk of Peter Jennings with the News, then a 15-minute nightly newscast. He replaced Ron Cochran, a fellow Canadian. At 26, Jennings was, and remains, the youngest-ever American network news anchor. "ABC was in bad shape at the time," Jennings said. "They were willing to try anything, and, to demonstrate the point, they tried me."

An inexperienced Jennings had a hard time keeping up with his rivals at the other networks, and he – and the upstart ABC News – could not compete with the venerable newscasts of Walter Cronkite at CBS and Chet Huntley and David Brinkley at NBC. Some in the American audience disliked Jennings's Canadian accent. He pronounced lieutenant as "leftenant", mangled the pronunciation of "Appomattox", and misidentified the "Marines' Hymn" as "Anchors Aweigh" at Lyndon B. Johnson's presidential inauguration; his lack of in-depth knowledge of American affairs and culture led critics to deride Jennings as a "glamorcaster". "It was a little ridiculous when you think about it," he later reflected. "A 26-year-old trying to compete with Cronkite, Huntley and Brinkley. I was simply unqualified." After three rocky years at the anchor desk, Jennings quit to become a foreign correspondent.

=== Foreign correspondent ===
Jennings attempted to build his journalism credentials abroad. In 1968, he established ABC's Middle East bureau in Beirut, Lebanon, the first American television news bureau in the Arab world. The next year, he demonstrated his growing sympathies regarding Middle Eastern affairs with Palestine: New State of Mind, a half-hour documentary for ABC's Now news program. As ABC's Beirut bureau chief, Jennings favored the Arab cause in the Arab–Israeli conflict, including the rise of the Palestinian Black September Organization during the early 1970s. He conducted the first American television interview with Palestine Liberation Organization chairman Yasser Arafat. While stationed in the Lebanese capital, Jennings dated Palestinian activist Hanan Ashrawi, who was then a graduate student in literature at the American University in Beirut.

In 1972, Jennings covered his first major breaking news story, the Munich Olympics massacre of Israeli athletes by Black September. His live reporting, which drew on the sympathy he had acquired for the Arab world, sought to influence Americans who were critical of the Palestinian group. By hiding with his camera crew close to the athletic compound where the Israeli athletes were being held hostage, Jennings was able to provide ABC with clear video of the masked hostage-takers. He would later be criticized for insisting on using the terms "guerillas" and "commandos" instead of "terrorists" to describe the members of Black September.

After events in Munich, Jennings continued to report on Middle East issues. In 1973, he covered the Yom Kippur War, and the following year, he served as chief correspondent and co-producer of Sadat: Action Biography, a profile of Egyptian president Anwar Sadat that would win him his first of two George Foster Peabody Awards. The documentary established Jennings as Sadat's favorite correspondent. That year, Jennings married for the second time, to Anouchka Malouf, a Lebanese photographer. His first wife was childhood sweetheart Valerie Godsoe.

Jennings returned to the U.S. at the end of 1974 to become Washington correspondent and news anchor for ABC's new morning program AM America, a predecessor to Good Morning America. ABC was hoping that the show, in which it had invested US$8 million, would challenge NBC's highly popular Today. AM America debuted on January 6, 1975, with Jennings delivering regular newscasts from Washington. The show never gained ground against Today, and was canceled in just ten months. In November 1975, Jennings moved abroad, this time as ABC's chief foreign correspondent. He continued to cover the Middle East, and in 1978 he was the first North American reporter to interview the Ayatollah Khomeini of Iran, then in exile in Paris.

Meanwhile, ABC News and its newly installed president, Roone Arledge, were preparing an overhaul of its nightly news program, which was then known as ABC Evening News and whose ratings had languished in third place behind CBS and NBC since its inception. In the late 1970s, a disastrous pairing of Harry Reasoner and Barbara Walters at the anchor desk left the network searching for new ideas. Arledge decided to implement a three-anchor format for the program. On July 10, 1978, World News Tonight debuted with Frank Reynolds in Washington, Max Robinson in Chicago, and Jennings in London. Jennings's official title was "Foreign Desk Anchor," although he continued to serve as the network's chief foreign correspondent. By mid-1979, the broadcast, which featured some of the same glitzy presentation as Arledge's previous television show, Wide World of Sports, had climbed in the ratings. The newscast had gained 1.9 million households from its debut, and was now in a dead heat with NBC's evening newscast.

In 1979, Jennings married for the third time to fellow ABC correspondent Kati Marton. That same year, he became a father when Marton gave birth to their daughter, Elizabeth. In 1982, Jennings's and Marton's second child, Christopher, was born.

As part of ABC's triumvirate, Jennings continued to cover major international news, especially Middle East issues. His nightly appearance at an anchor desk in London convinced some viewers that ABC News was more dedicated to foreign news than the other networks. Jennings reported on the Iranian Revolution and subsequent hostage crisis, the assassination of Sadat, the Falklands War, Israel's 1982 conflict with the Palestine Liberation Organization in Lebanon, and Pope John Paul II's 1983 visit to Poland. His insistence on covering the major international stories himself irked some of his fellow ABC foreign correspondents, who came to resent being scooped by what they deemed as "Jennings's Flying Circus." Jennings, too, was not completely satisfied with his job in London. When his contract expired with ABC in the early 1980s, Jennings flirted with the possibility of moving back to Canada and working with the CBC on its new nightly newscast, The Journal. The CBC could not meet Jennings's renegotiation demands, though, and the deal fell through.

=== Sole anchor ===
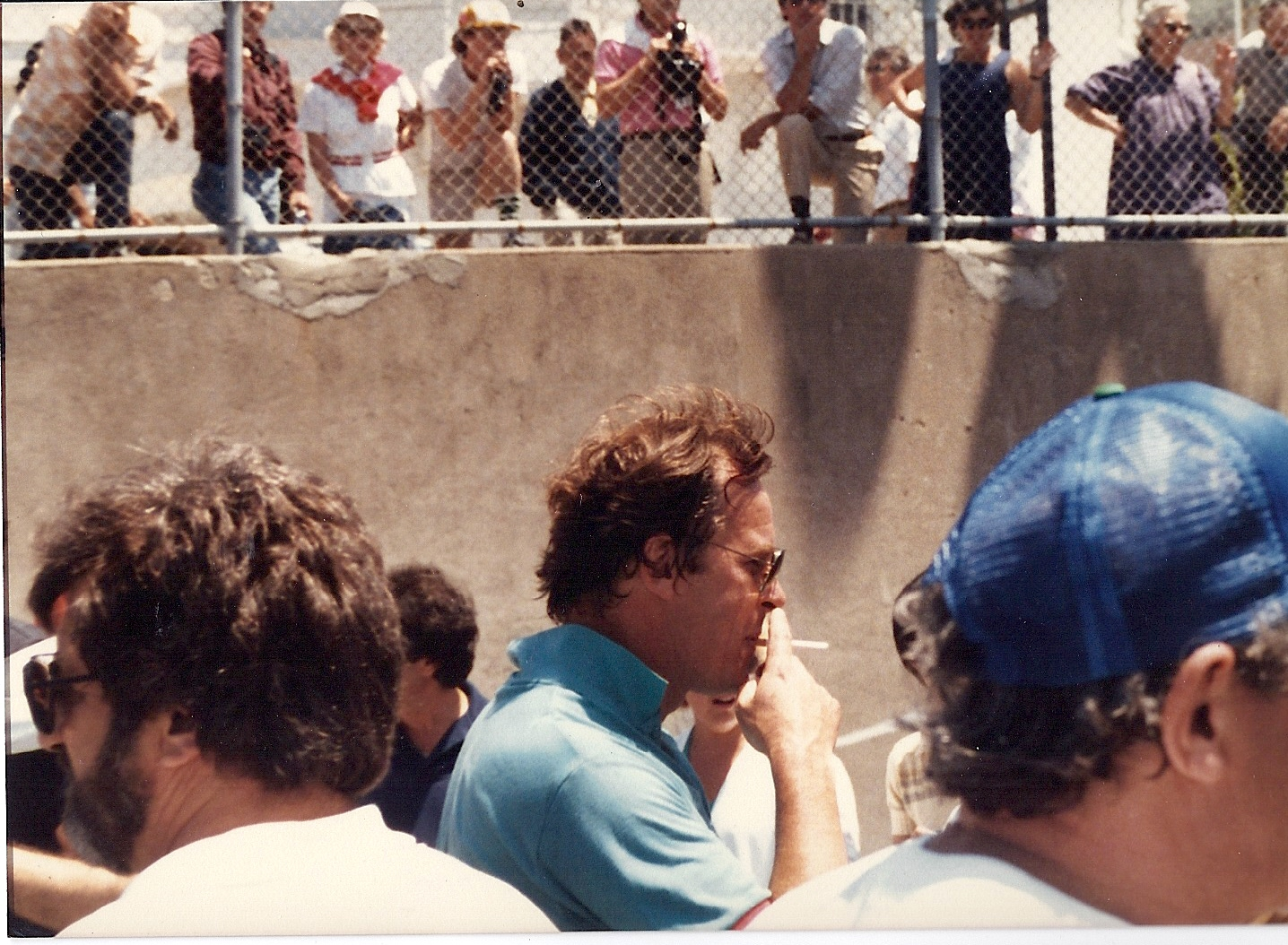
Jennings (in center in blue shirt) while in San Francisco in 1984

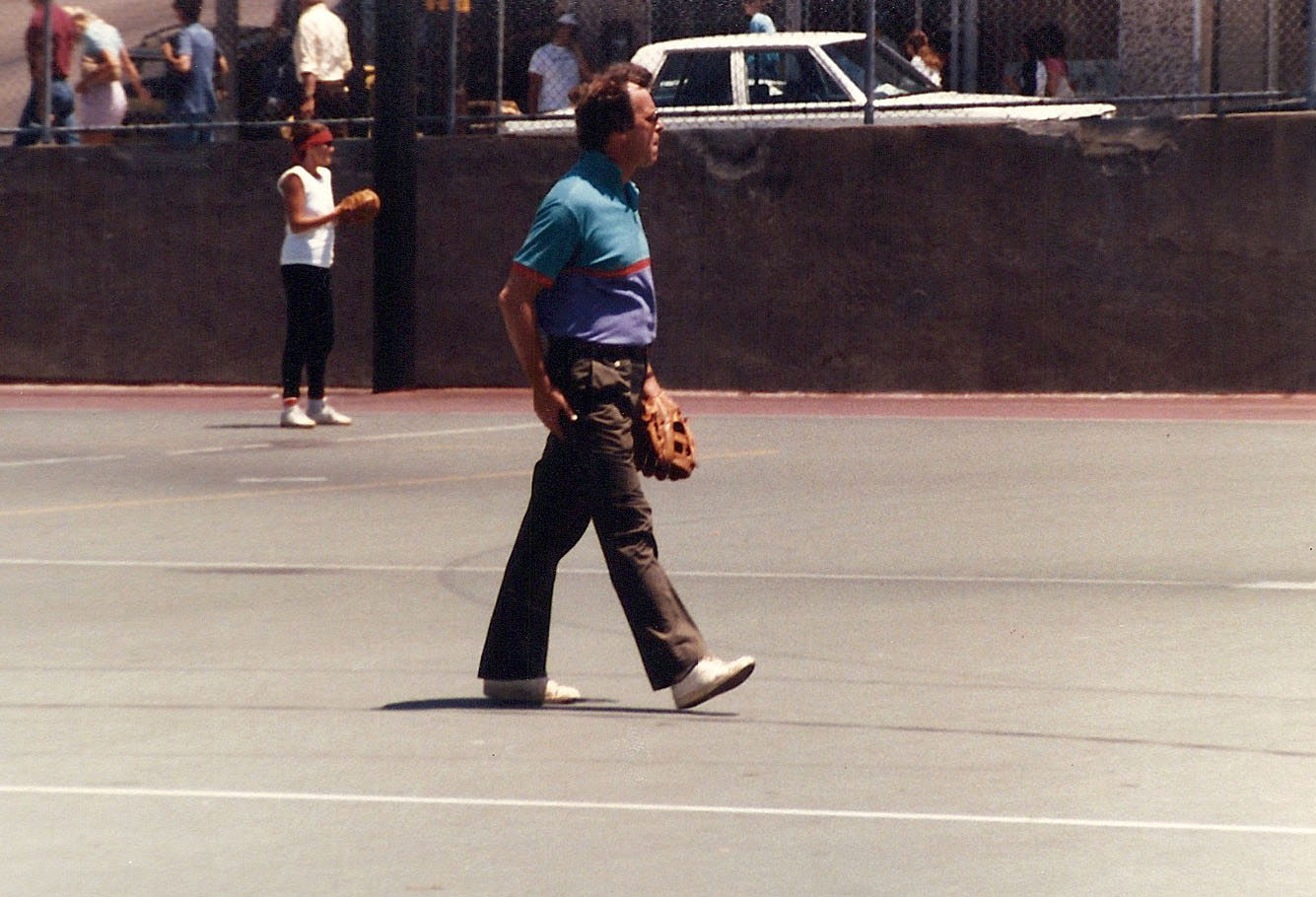
Jennings playing center fielder at a recreational softball game in San Francisco during the 1984 Democratic National Convention

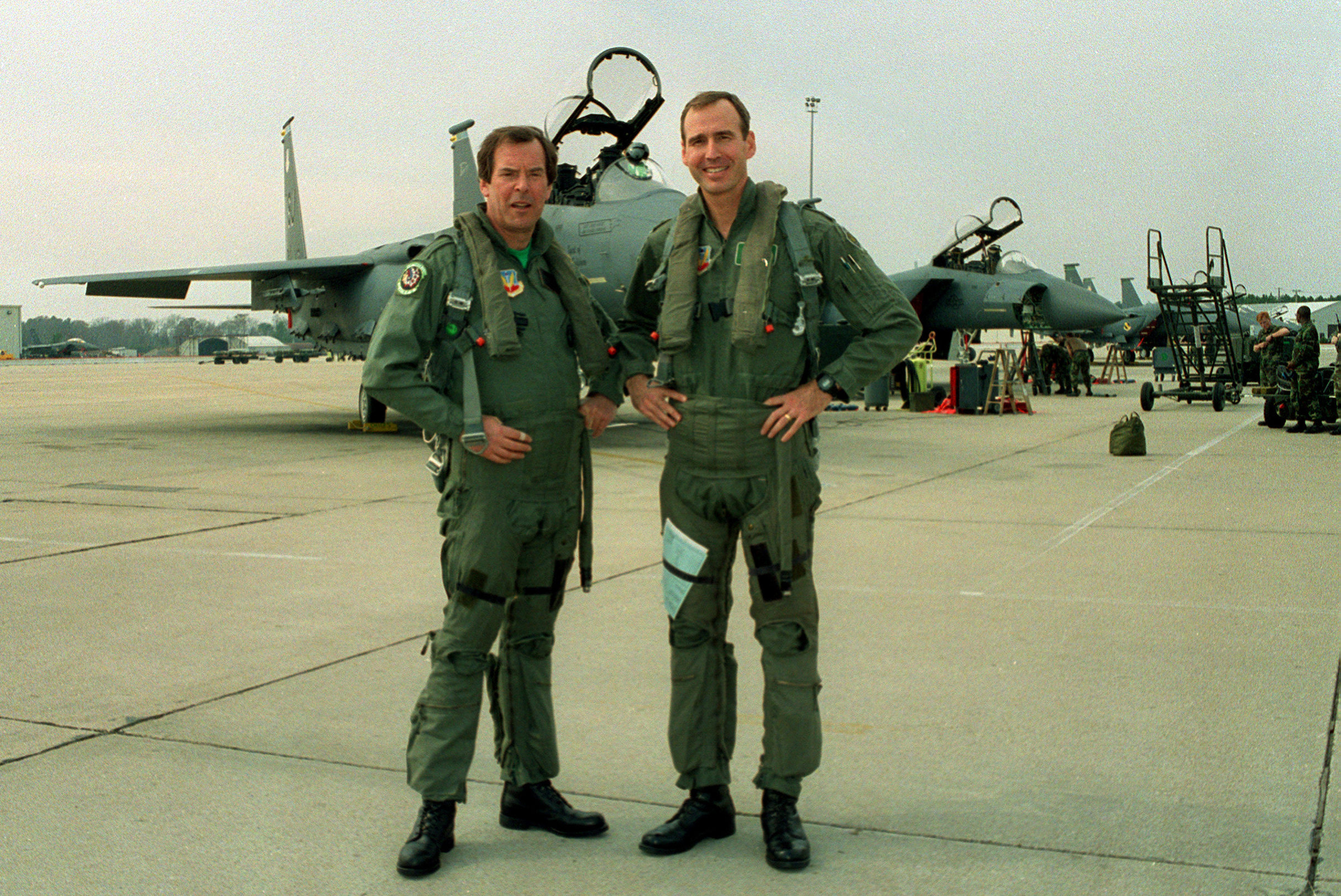
Jennings in a flight suit prior to a F-15E Strike Eagle flight in February 1994

In 1983, Reynolds fell ill with multiple myeloma, a type of blood cancer that often attacks the bones, and was forced to stop anchoring in April. His absence caused a dip in the ratings for ABC's nightly newscast. ABC originally expected a full recovery, and relocated Jennings to its Washington bureau to fill in for Reynolds while he was sick; the move helped buoy the newscast's ratings, though it remained in third place. On July 20, 1983, Reynolds died unexpectedly after developing acute hepatitis.

On August 9, 1983, ABC announced that Jennings had signed a four-year contract with the network and would become the sole anchor and senior editor for World News Tonight on September 5. Jennings would anchor the program from New York City, the program's new base of operations. The announcement signaled a generational shift in the evening news broadcasts, and the beginning of what the media would deem the "Big Three" era of Jennings, Dan Rather of CBS, and Tom Brokaw of NBC. Rather had already been elevated to anchor in 1981 after the retirement of Walter Cronkite, and Brokaw of NBC Nightly News was set to become sole anchor the same day as Jennings. At the time, Jennings expressed apprehension that the impending competition among the three newsmen was at risk of becoming superficial. "With me, Brokaw and Rather, I recognize that there will be the factor of three pretty faces," he said. "That's an inevitable byproduct of television. But if that is what it comes down to in terms of the approach we take, if our approach is that singular, then we will all have made a mistake."

Jennings's debut on September 5, 1983, marked the beginning of a steady climb in the ratings for ABC News.^{[a]} He spent his first year at the anchor desk educating himself on American domestic affairs in preparation for the 1984 presidential campaign season.^{[b]} In June 1984, Jennings, who later admitted that his political knowledge was limited at the time, co-anchored ABC's coverage of the Democratic National Convention with David Brinkley. "I had not covered an election campaign in 16 years," Jennings said, "so here was I going to co-anchor with David Brinkley in 1984, and he wasn't even sure I knew who the faces belonged to, and he was right." Jennings and ABC were criticized for suddenly halting coverage of the convention for 30 minutes and airing a rerun of Hart to Hart instead.

Despite a shaky start at the anchor desk, Jennings's broadcast began to climb in the ratings and covered the 1986 Chernobyl nuclear disaster in the Soviet Union. Jennings was praised for his performance during the 1986 Space Shuttle Challenger disaster, when he anchored ABC's coverage of the event for 11 straight hours. By 1989, competition among the three nightly newscasts had risen to fever pitch. When the Loma Prieta earthquake struck the San Francisco Bay area, media pundits praised Jennings and ABC News for their prompt on-air response, while criticizing the delayed reaction of Tom Brokaw and NBC News. The next month, Brokaw redeemed himself by scooping the other networks with news of the fall of the Berlin Wall. It was World News Tonight, however, that ended the year at the top; ABC's evening newscast spent the last 13 weeks of the year in first place, and its average ratings for the entire year beat CBS for the first time.

Jennings's on-air success continued in 1990, and World News Tonight consistently led the ratings race. In January, he anchored the first installment of Peter Jennings Reporting—hour-long, prime-time ABC News specials dedicated to exploring a single topic. His inaugural program on gun violence in America drew praise. His second installment of Peter Jennings Reporting in April, "From the Killing Fields", focused on U.S. policy towards Cambodia. The program alleged that the federal government was covertly supporting the Khmer Rouge's return to power in the Asian nation, a charge that the Bush administration initially denied. On July 18, the White House announced that it was ending recognition of the Khmer Rouge.

When the Gulf War started on January 17, 1991, Jennings began a marathon anchoring stint to cover the story, spending 20 of the first 48 hours of the war on-air, and leading ABC News to its highest-ever ratings.^{[c]} After interrupting regular Saturday morning cartoons on January 19 to broadcast a military briefing from Saudi Arabia, Jennings and ABC became concerned about the emotional impact of the war coverage on children. Out of that concern, Jennings hosted a 90-minute special, War in the Gulf: Answering Children's Questions the next Saturday morning; the program featured Jennings, ABC correspondents, and American military personnel answering phoned-in questions and explaining the war to young viewers.

On October 12, 1991, breaking news forced ABC News to interrupt regular Saturday morning programming again. Jennings was once again mindful of his audience, prefacing the coverage of the Senate confirmation hearings for Supreme Court nominee Clarence Thomas with remarks for children. "You may hear some not very nice language," said Jennings. He noted that Thomas and his accuser, Anita Hill, "have a very painful disagreement about some things the woman says the man did to her when they were working together. ... You can ask your parents to tell you more." Jennings continued to produce special programs aimed at young viewers, anchoring Growing Up in the Age of AIDS, a frank, 90-minute-long discussion on AIDS in February 1992; and Prejudice: Answering Children's Questions, a forum on racism in April 1992.

Politics dominated network news in 1992. Jennings moderated the final debate among the Democratic presidential candidates in March, and anchored Peter Jennings Reporting: Who Is Ross Perot? and a subsequent 90-minute town forum with Perot and a studio audience in June. On September 9, 1992, ABC announced that it would be switching the format of its political coverage to give less recognition to staged sound bites. "We're aware that a lot of you are turned off by the political process and that many of you put at least some of the blame on us," Jennings told viewers on World News Tonight. "We'll only devote time to a candidate's daily routine if it is more than routine. There will be less attention to staged appearances and sound bites designed exclusively for television." After Bill Clinton was elected president in November 1992, Jennings featured the new administration in two of his specials for children; he anchored President Clinton: Answering Children's Questions in February 1993; and Kids in the Crossfire: Violence in America in November 1993, a live special from a Washington, DC, junior high school which featured Attorney General Janet Reno and rapper MC Lyte.

The early 1990s also served up a series of difficult experiences and public embarrassment for Jennings. On August 13, 1993, Jennings and Kati Marton publicly announced their separation in Newsday. The couple had previously split in 1987 for four months after Jennings found out that Marton was having an affair with Washington Post columnist Richard Cohen. In January 1994, he locked horns with his executive producer on World News Tonight, Emily Rooney. The public firing of Rooney made national headlines, and put Jennings on the defensive.

Despite winning a Peabody Award, Peter Jennings Reporting: Hiroshima: Why the Bomb Was Dropped, which aired on July 27, 1995, a week before the 50th anniversary of the atomic bombing of Hiroshima, drew scorn. Reviewing the show for The Washington Post, Ken Ringle called it "an ingenue's stroll down the narrow tunnels of academic revisionism" that "purports to discover a post-World War II coverup -- a smoke screen designed to refute any suggestion that the Hiroshima bombing was anything but a military necessity." Some viewers of the documentary mailed bus fares to Jennings, telling him to return to Canada.

Jennings pleased some conservatives though, after his three-year lobbying effort to create a full-time religion correspondent at ABC News succeeded in the hiring of Peggy Wehmeyer in January 1994, making her the first such network reporter. ABC increased its coverage of religious topics, and in March 1995, Jennings anchored Peter Jennings Reporting: In the Name of God, a well-received documentary on the changing nature of American churches. At a taping of a "town meeting" segment for KOMO-TV of Seattle in February 1995, Jennings expressed regret for his ABC radio remarks on the 1994 midterm elections. "People thought I had insulted their sacred mandate and some thought I should go back to Canada," he said. "I hope I don't make that mistake again."

During the mid-1990s, some television critics praised Jennings for his insistence on not letting the O. J. Simpson murder case swamp the newscast.^{[d]} Instead, Jennings devoted his energies to covering the Bosnian War, anchoring three hour-long prime time specials on the subject and one Saturday-morning special aimed at children. ABC dedicated more time to covering the conflict than any other network from 1992 to 1996. Jennings received the Goldsmith Career Award for Excellence in Journalism from Harvard Kennedy School at Harvard University, in large part for his passion for the story. Jennings was also credited for raising the profile in the U.S. of another international story, the 1995 Quebec referendum. Some members of the Canadian press in particular raved about his in-depth coverage of the issue, and he was the only anchor to broadcast from Canada on the eve of the referendum.

Despite these critical successes, in 1996, World News Tonight started gradually slipping in the ratings race. Bolstered by strong viewership of its coverage of the 1996 Summer Olympic Games and heavy coverage of O.J. Simpson's trial, NBC's Nightly News overtook the ABC newscast for two weeks in late July and early September. This short bump provided momentum for NBC, which started making steady gains in the ratings. Worried, Jennings and ABC decided to cut back on international reporting and give more air time to "soft stories", in an effort to emulate the success of Nightly News. The changes provoked a backlash from regular viewers, and ratings plummeted. "We did very badly with it," Jennings said. "The audience kicked us in the teeth." Although changes were made to World News Tonight to restore its commitment to major issues and stop the hemorrhaging, Nightly News ended 1997 as the number-one evening newscast.

The slide in the ratings coincided with some rockiness at ABC News. The company scrapped plans to develop a cable news channel. On May 29, 1998, David Westin succeeded Roone Arledge as president of ABC News. Both denied that the disappointing ratings performance of World News Tonight contributed to the decision. A 24-hour strike by the National Association of Broadcast Employees and Technicians disrupted ABC's coverage of 1998's November elections after talks between the union and ABC broke down. Several Democratic candidates denied interviews to support the union.

External videos
- Booknotes interview with Jennings on The Century, December 27, 1998, C-SPAN
- Presentation by Jennings and Todd Brewster on The Century, March 11, 1999, C-SPAN

None of the shake-ups helped Jennings retake the nightly ratings crown, but World News Tonight still offered stiff competition at second place. As the millennium approached, Jennings and the network started preparing for extensive retrospectives of the 20th century. The anchor teamed with former Life magazine journalist Todd Brewster to pen The Century, a 606-page book on 20th-century America. Designed as a companion book for ABC's upcoming documentary series of the same name, the book topped The New York Times Best Seller list in December 1998, a month after it debuted. On March 29, 1999, Jennings anchored the first installment of ABC's 12-hour miniseries, The Century; production on the monumental project started in 1990, and by the time it aired, it had cost the network US$25 million.^{[e]} Jennings also anchored a longer, 15-hour version, The Century: America's Time, on the History Channel in April 1999.

On December 31, 1999, Jennings was on the air for 23 straight hours to anchor ABC 2000 Today, ABC's massive millennium eve special. An estimated 175 million people tuned into at least a portion of the program. Jennings's American prime-time audience, an estimated 18.6 million viewers, easily outpaced the millennium coverage of rival networks. Television critics praised the program, and described the anchor as "superhuman". Although production costs totaled a hefty $11 million (compared with $2 million each for NBC's and CBS's millennium projects), ABC managed to make a profit of $5 million. The success of the program, though, failed to transfer into any lasting change in the viewership of World News Tonight; ABC's evening newscast spent the first week of January as ratings leader, before dropping back to second place.

With another presidential election taking place in 2000, Jennings had some more political reporting duties that year. On January 5, Jennings moderated the Democratic primary debate, held at the University of New Hampshire. He hosted the primetime news special The Dark Horizon: India, Pakistan, and the Bomb, which ABC broadcast on March 22, as then-President Clinton began his trip to the region. Jennings was the only American news anchor to travel to India for Clinton's trip. Paul A. Slavin became the new executive producer for World News Tonight in April.

==== September 11 ====
Jennings anchored ABC's coverage of the September 11 attacks for 17 straight hours, an effort described as "Herculean" by television critics. Like other network news anchors, he was widely praised for guiding Americans through the disaster. When the South tower collapsed, Jennings at first did not understand what was happening, saying "We now have a—what do we have?" ABC Correspondent John Miller thought it might be "A new large plume of smoke." Jennings then went to Correspondent on the ground Don Dahler to ask what was happening; Dahler replied, "The second building that was hit by the plane has just completely collapsed. The entire building has just collapsed...it folded in on itself and it's not there anymore." Jennings still did not understand, asking, "The whole side has collapsed?". Dahler repeated, "The whole building has collapsed". Jennings asked once more to confirm, and Dahler repeated, "The building has collapsed." Jennings then said, "We are talking about massive casualties here at the moment, and we have... that is extraordinary." When the North Tower collapsed, Jennings quietly said "Oh, my God." After a pause, he said, "It's hard to put it into words, and maybe one doesn't need to. Both Trade Towers, where thousands of people work, on this day, Tuesday, have now been attacked and destroyed with thousands of people either in them or in the immediate area adjacent to them." At one point, Jennings broke his composure after receiving phone calls from his children. "We do not very often make recommendations for people's behavior from this chair," he said, "but...if you're a parent, you've got a kid in some other part of the country, call them up. Exchange observations."

His coverage was not without controversy. Jennings was criticized by Rush Limbaugh among others for commenting about President George W. Bush on-air: "Where is the president of the United States? ... I know we don't know where he is, but pretty soon the country needs to know where he is." ABC was flooded with more than 10,000 angry phone calls and e-mails. On September 13, Jennings received more criticism — this time for hosting a forum for Middle East experts that included Palestinian Authority negotiator Hanan Ashrawi. In mid-2002, Jennings and ABC refused to allow Toby Keith to open their coverage of July 4 celebrations with "Courtesy of the Red, White and Blue (The Angry American)", prompting criticism from Keith and country music fans, who highlighted Jennings's Canadian citizenship.

The events of September 11 added new meaning to In Search of America, the project Jennings and Brewster started after the success of their previous collaboration. The two began writing the book in early 2001; after the terrorist attacks, they revisited many of the people they had interviewed to see how the events had affected them. To promote the book, the anchor and World News Tonight started a 50-state tour of the United States in April 2002 as part of a yearlong project, 50 States/One Nation/One Year. Jennings also anchored a six-part television series in September 2002, which featured the same name as the book. Despite the success of the TV series and heavy promotion by the book's publisher, In Search of America failed to generate much interest or sales.

Jennings's work on In Search of America and the September 11 attacks contributed to his decision in 2003 to become a dual citizen of Canada and the United States. "I think that 9/11 and the subsequent travel I did in the country afterwards made me feel connected in new ways," he said. "And when we were working on the America project I spent a lot of time on the road, which meant away from my editor's desk, and I just got much more connected to the Founding Fathers' dreams and ideas for the future." His work had prepared him well for the citizenship test, which he passed easily. "Can you imagine I, who just finished a whole series on America and had been an anchorperson for an American broadcast...could you imagine if I had failed?" he asked. "It would have been horrendous." The anchor's formal pledge of allegiance took place at a regular citizenship ceremony on May 30 in Lower Manhattan. The occasion overwhelmed him. "I went in the front door and came out the front door. They were regular people. They were very touching. And I cried a little bit — my kids didn't cry, but I cried a bit — but I'm a fairly emotional character anyway."

=== Leaving the chair ===
Jennings informing viewers of ABC World News Tonight of his diagnosis with lung cancer in a taped message on April 5, 2005

As some of you now know, I have learned in the last couple of days that I have lung cancer. Yes, I was a smoker until about 20 years ago, and I was weak, and I smoked over 9/11. But whatever the reason, the news does slow you down a bit.

— Jennings's announcement on his cancer diagnosis

As he did in 2000, Jennings moderated the 2004 Democratic presidential primary debate, which was held that year at Saint Anselm College in New Hampshire. He was noted for questioning General Wesley Clark over Clark's silence over controversial comments made by filmmaker Michael Moore, a supporter of Clark. Moore called then-President George W. Bush a "deserter".

By late 2004, Brokaw had retired from his anchoring duties at NBC, ceding the reins to Brian Williams; Rather planned to step down in March 2005. Jennings and ABC saw an opportunity to gain viewers, and initiated a publicity blitz touting the anchor's foreign reporting experience. However, despite having almost always reported from the scene of any major news story, Jennings was sidelined by an upper respiratory infection in late December 2004; he was forced to anchor from the ABC News Headquarters in New York during the aftermath of the Asian tsunami, while his competitors traveled to the region. For Jennings, the situation was agonizing.

In late March, viewers started noticing that Jennings's voice sounded uncharacteristically gravelly and unhealthy during evening newscasts. On April 1, 2005, he anchored World News Tonight for the last time; his failing health also prevented him from covering the death and funeral of Pope John Paul II. On April 5, 2005, Jennings informed viewers through a taped message on World News Tonight that he had been diagnosed with a final stage of lung cancer, he said he was a chain smoker and then he quit smoking in 1984 and then he went back to smoking the day after the September 11 attacks. Although he stated his intention to continue anchoring whenever possible, the message was to be his last appearance on television.

Throughout the summer, Charles Gibson, co-host of Good Morning America, and Elizabeth Vargas, co-host of 20/20, served as temporary anchors. On April 29, 2005, Jennings posted a letter on ABCNews.com with an update of his status and expressing thanks to those who had offered him their good wishes and prayers. In June, Jennings visited the ABC News headquarters, and addressed staff members in an emotional scene in the World News Tonight newsroom; he thanked Gibson for closing each broadcast with the phrase, "for Peter Jennings and all of us at ABC News." During his visit, however, his colleagues noticed he was ill to the point where he could barely speak. He posted another short letter of thanks on July 29, 2005, his 67th birthday.

=== Death ===
Jennings died of lung cancer in his New York apartment on August 7, 2005, at the age of 67. His fourth wife, two children, and sister were at his side.

Just after 11:30 p.m. EDT that evening, Charles Gibson broke into local news in the eastern U.S. and regular programming on ABC's western affiliates to announce Jennings's death. The anchor's ABC colleagues, including Barbara Walters, Diane Sawyer, and Ted Koppel, shared their thoughts on Jennings's death. The next morning, Tom Brokaw of NBC and Dan Rather of CBS fondly remembered their former rival on the morning news shows. "Peter, of the three of us, was our prince," said Brokaw on Today. "He seemed so timeless. He had such élan and style." Canada's television networks led off their morning news shows with the news of Jennings's death and had remembrances from their "big three" anchors, Peter Mansbridge at the CBC, Lloyd Robertson at CTV, and Kevin Newman (himself a former colleague of Jennings at ABC) at Global.

American President George W. Bush and Canadian Prime Minister Paul Martin offered statements of condolence to the press.

On August 10, 2005, ABC aired a two-hour special, Peter Jennings: Reporter, with archival clips of his reports and interviews with colleagues and friends. The special drew more than nine million viewers, and was the most-watched television program of the night. For the week of his death, World News Tonight placed number one in the ratings race for the first time since June 2004.

Jennings's widow, Kayce Freed, and family held a private service in New York. Jennings's body was cremated and his ashes split in half. Half of his ashes remained in his home on Long Island and the other half was placed in his summer home in the Gatineau Hills, near Ottawa. The 57th Primetime Emmy Awards on September 18, 2005, included a tribute to Jennings by Brokaw and Rather. A public memorial service for Jennings was held two days later at Carnegie Hall. Notable journalists, political leaders, and other friends of Jennings attended. Jennings left a US$50 million estate: half went to Freed, and most of the rest to his son and daughter. On December 5, 2005, after much speculation, and nearly eight months after Jennings stopped anchoring, ABC named Vargas and Bob Woodruff co-anchors for World News Tonight.

In 2007, a book, Peter Jennings: A Reporter's Life, was published, co-edited by his widow Kayce Freed and his ABC colleague Lynn Sherr. The book contained an oral history compiled from a number of interviews. Publishers Weekly described the book as "predictably positive" and "reminding readers of the commanding presence Jennings held over broadcast journalism". Parksville Qualicum News described it as "browse-able" but with "a few holes left".

== Honors ==
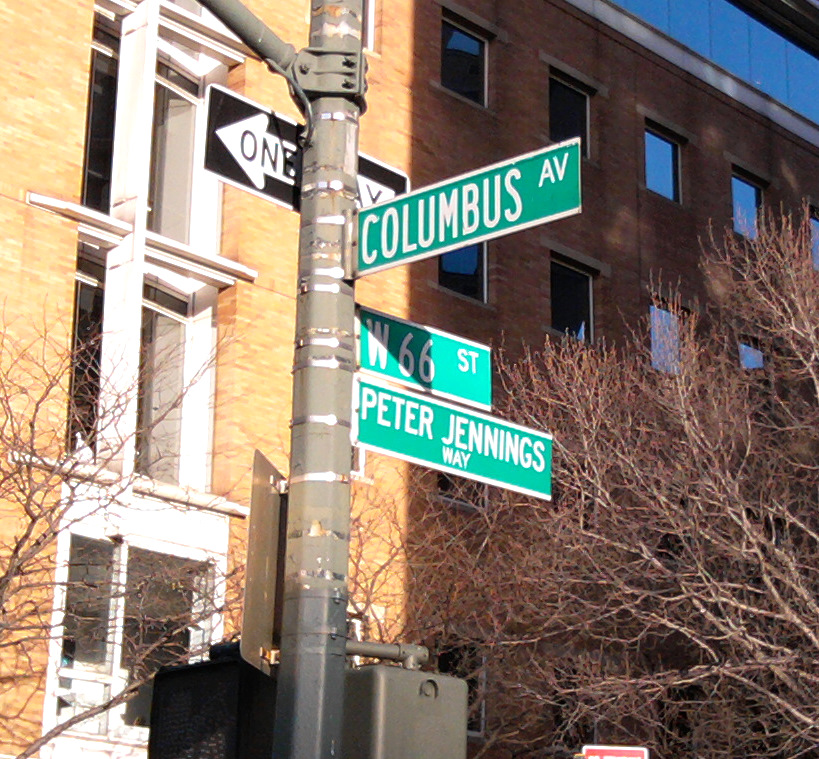
Peter Jennings Way, a Manhattan street named in Jennings's honor

Jennings won numerous honors throughout his career, including 16 Emmy Awards and two George Foster Peabody Awards. His work on World News Tonight and Peter Jennings Reporting consistently won Overseas Press Club and duPont-Columbia awards. At the peak of his popularity, Jennings was named "Best Anchor" by the Washington Journalism Review in 1988, 1989, 1990, and 1992. The Radio and Television News Directors Association awarded Jennings its highest honor, the Paul White Award in 1995, in recognition of his lifetime contributions to journalism. In 2004, he was awarded with the Edward R. Murrow Award for Lifetime Achievement in Broadcasting from Washington State University.

Just eight days before his death, Jennings was informed that he would be inducted into the Order of Canada, the nation's highest civilian honor. His daughter, Elizabeth, accepted the insignia on his behalf in October 2005. On February 21, 2006, New York City Mayor Michael Bloomberg designated the block on West 66th Street between Columbus Avenue and Central Park West as Peter Jennings Way in honor of the late anchor; the block was formerly home to the ABC News headquarters. In October 2006, The Walt Disney Company, which bought ABC in 1996, posthumously named Jennings a Disney Legend, the company's highest honor. He was the first ABC News employee so honored. In January 2011, Jennings was posthumously inducted into the Academy of Television Arts and Sciences' Television Hall of Fame.

== Publications ==
=== Articles ===
- "Moose Jaw, U.S.A.? Never! Jamais!" Maclean's, p. 86. June 25, 1990.
- "TV's opportunity for service at Geneva." The Christian Science Monitor, p. 28. November 12, 1985.
- Jennings, Peter; Brewster, Todd (January 27, 2003). "Variations for Four Hands On a Theme by Tocqueville". The New York Times. p. E1.

=== Books ===
- with Todd Brewster. The Century. London: Doubleday (1999). ISBN 0-385-48327-9.
- with Todd Brewster. The Century for Young People. New York: Random House (1999). ISBN 0-385-32708-0.
- with Todd Brewster. In Search of America. New York: Hyperion (2002). ISBN 0-7868-6708-6.

== TV/video narration ==
In 1969–1970, Jennings narrated The Fabulous Sixties, a 10-part Canadian television documentary miniseries that first aired on CTV on October 12, 1969, with the following episodes broadcast as occasional specials into 1970. Each episode covered one year of the 1960s.

In 2003, Jennings narrated The Kennedy Assassination: Beyond Conspiracy, an ABC documentary covering the John F. Kennedy assassination.

== See also ==
- Ecstasy Rising
- New Yorkers in journalism

== Notes ==
a. Jennings's debut program led with coverage of Korean Air Lines Flight 007. It also featured stories on the resignation of Israeli Prime Minister Menachem Begin, violent clashes in Lebanon, labor unions, and tennis's U.S. Open.

b. Jennings's performance during the 1984 presidential campaign was analyzed in a 1986 study led by Syracuse University professor Brian Mullen. He concluded that Jennings "exhibited a facial expression bias in favor of Reagan". Mullen's team repeated the study to analyze Jennings's performance in the 1988 presidential election, concluding that the ABC anchor again favored a Republican candidate. Television critic Tom Shales also noticed a pro-Reagan bias in Jennings's reporting, referring to ABC as "a news organization that is already considered the White House favorite" in May 1985.

c. ABC News "had its highest evening newscast rating ever the first week in the war, and two nights of its prime-time coverage were among the 10 most-watched shows on television".

d. In 1994, the three major networks devoted 1,592 total minutes to covering the Simpson criminal case; while ABC had 423, CBS had 580 and NBC 589. The Simpson trial was the number-one news story for NBC and CBS in 1995, while at ABC, coverage of the War in Bosnia and Herzegovina dominated the newscast. Jennings stated in a 1996 interview that he was satisfied that ABC came in third in terms of O.J. coverage. "I'm very pleased that it didn't crowd out as much of the rest of the world on World News Tonight as it did on other broadcasts," he said. "I am very pleased it was not our major story of last year as it was at other networks."

e. The immense scope of The Century caused headaches for those developing it. It survived three major changes in narrative approach, three different executive producers, and various attempts to axe the entire project. By the time it aired, all of the people interviewed for their anecdotes of World War I had died. Jennings, though, downplayed criticism of the program's rocky history. "Name me a news organization that doesn't have some degree of turmoil on a major project," he said. "What people care about in The New York Times is what gets in the paper. It's the same with us. There are people out there who think their job is to set the bar for us, but the bar for me is set by the audience, and I think there is a real hunger out there from everyone I encounter to relive and experience and learn from what's gone on over the last 100 years."
