= Alan I. Leshner =

American scientist & academic

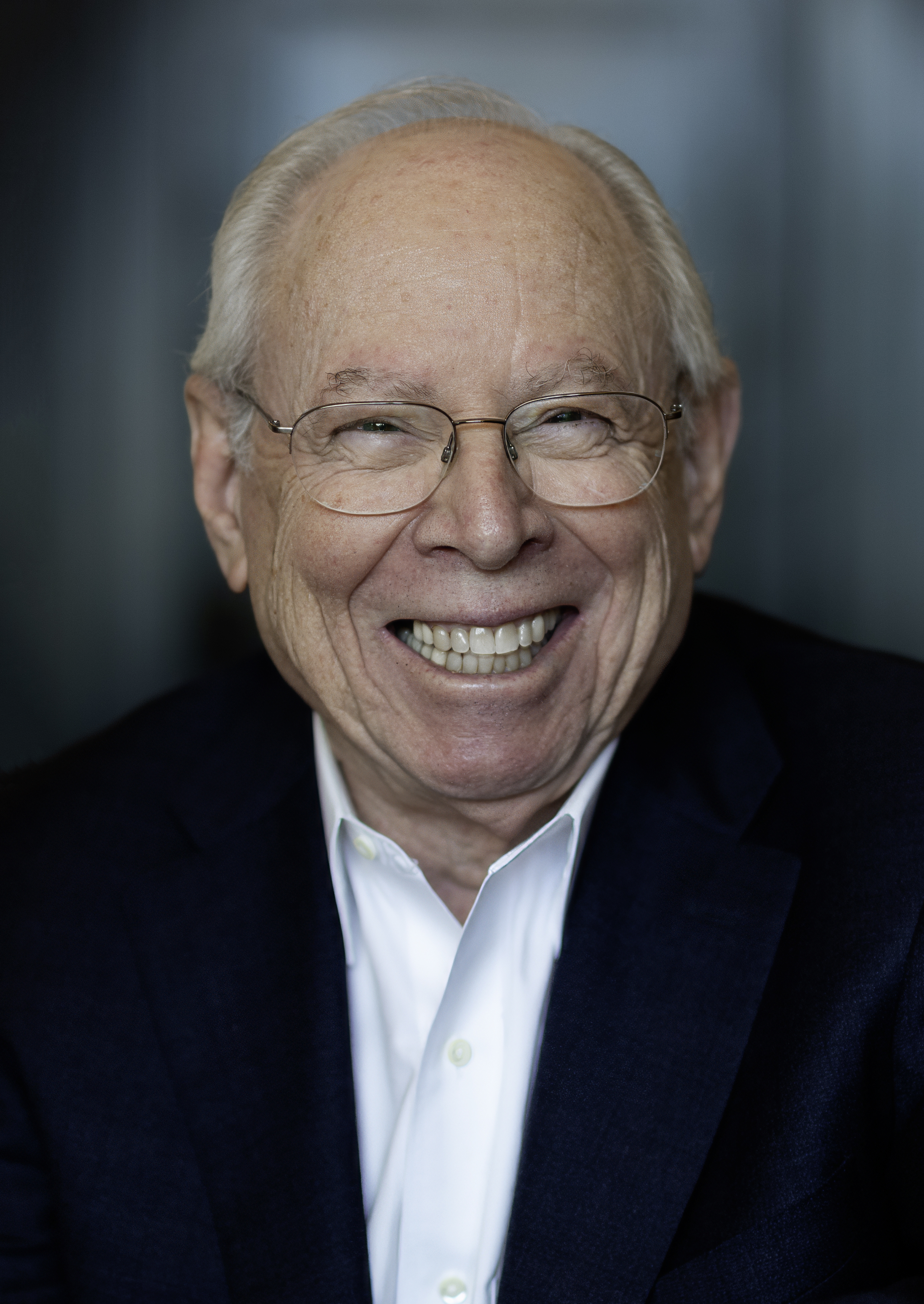
- Alan Leshner in 2026

Director of the National Institute of Mental Health (acting)
- In office 1990–1992
- Preceded by: Lewis Judd
- Succeeded by: Frederick K. Goodwin

Personal details
- Education: Franklin and Marshall College; Rutgers University

Alan Leshner is an American psychologist who served as director of the National Institute on Drug Abuse, and the National Institute of Mental Health, has held senior positions at the National Science Foundation and the American Association for the Advancement of Science, and serves on the National Science Board.

== Education ==
Leshner received an undergraduate degree with Honors in psychology from Franklin and Marshall College in 1965. He earned an M.S. in physiological psychology from Rutgers University in 1967, and a Ph.D. degree in physiological psychology from Rutgers in 1969.

== Academia ==
Leshner spent 10 years at Bucknell University, where he was Professor of Psychology. He has also held long-term appointments at the Postgraduate Medical School in Budapest, Hungary, at the Wisconsin Regional Primate Research Center, and as a Fulbright Scholar at the Weizmann Institute of Science in Israel.

He is the author of a major textbook on the relationship between hormones and behavior, and has published over 200 papers for both the scientific and lay communities on the biology of behavior, science and technology policy, science education, and public engagement with science.

== Public service ==
Leshner served as director of the National Institute on Drug Abuse (NIDA) from 1994 to 2001. One of the scientific institutes of the U.S. National Institutes of Health, NIDA supports over 85 percent of the world's research on the health aspects of drug abuse and addiction.

Before becoming director of NIDA, Leshner was the deputy director and acting director of the National Institute of Mental Health. He went to NIMH from the National Science Foundation (NSF), where he held a variety of senior positions, focusing on basic research in the biological, behavioral and social sciences, science policy and science education.

Leshner has served on many non-profit boards and committees. Most recently he has been Chair of the Committee on Science, Engineering, Medicine, and Public Policy of the National Academies of Science, Engineering and Medicine and Chair of the Health and Medicine Division Advisory Committee of the National Research Council.

== American Association for the Advancement of Science ==
Leshner was the chief executive officer of the American Association for the Advancement of Science (AAAS) and Executive Publisher of the journal Science from December 2001 to February 2015. AAAS, founded in 1848, is the world's largest, multi-disciplinary scientific and engineering society.

== Honors ==
Leshner is an elected fellow of AAAS, the National Academy of Public Administration, the American Academy of Arts and Sciences, and many other professional societies. He is a member of the National Academy of Medicine of the National Academies of Sciences, Engineering and Medicine. He received the Walsh McDermott Medal from the National Academy of Medicine in 2015.

George W. Bush appointed Dr. Leshner to the National Science Board in 2004. He was reappointed to the NSB by President Obama in 2011.

He also has been awarded seven honorary Doctor of Science degrees, including one from Georgetown University in May 2014.

== See also ==
- Retracted article on dopaminergic neurotoxicity of MDMA
