= Modern American School (Mexico) =

School in Mexico City

Modern American School (MAS; Spanish: Escuela Moderna Americana, S.C.) is a private, co-educational day school in Romero de Terreros, Coyoacán, Mexico City. It serves kindergarten and preschool through senior year of high school. The Modern American School ranked 2nd out of more than 90 private schools in the 2020 Reforma Mexico City High School rankings.

The school was established in 1952 by teacher María Vilchis Barroso de Rodríguez and her husband Javier Rodríguez Rodríguez. Since its foundation MAS has been a co-ed, non-religious and bilingual (English and Spanish) institution.

== Notable alumni ==
- Arturo Sarukhán Casamitjana (born 1963), former Ambassador of Mexico to the United States.
- Pablo Kuri-Morales (born 1961), former Deputy Secretary of Health.
- Monica Lavín (born 1955), award-winning author and journalist.
- Nora Volkov (born 1956), director of the US National Institute on Drug Abuse.
