= Nora Volkow =

American physician

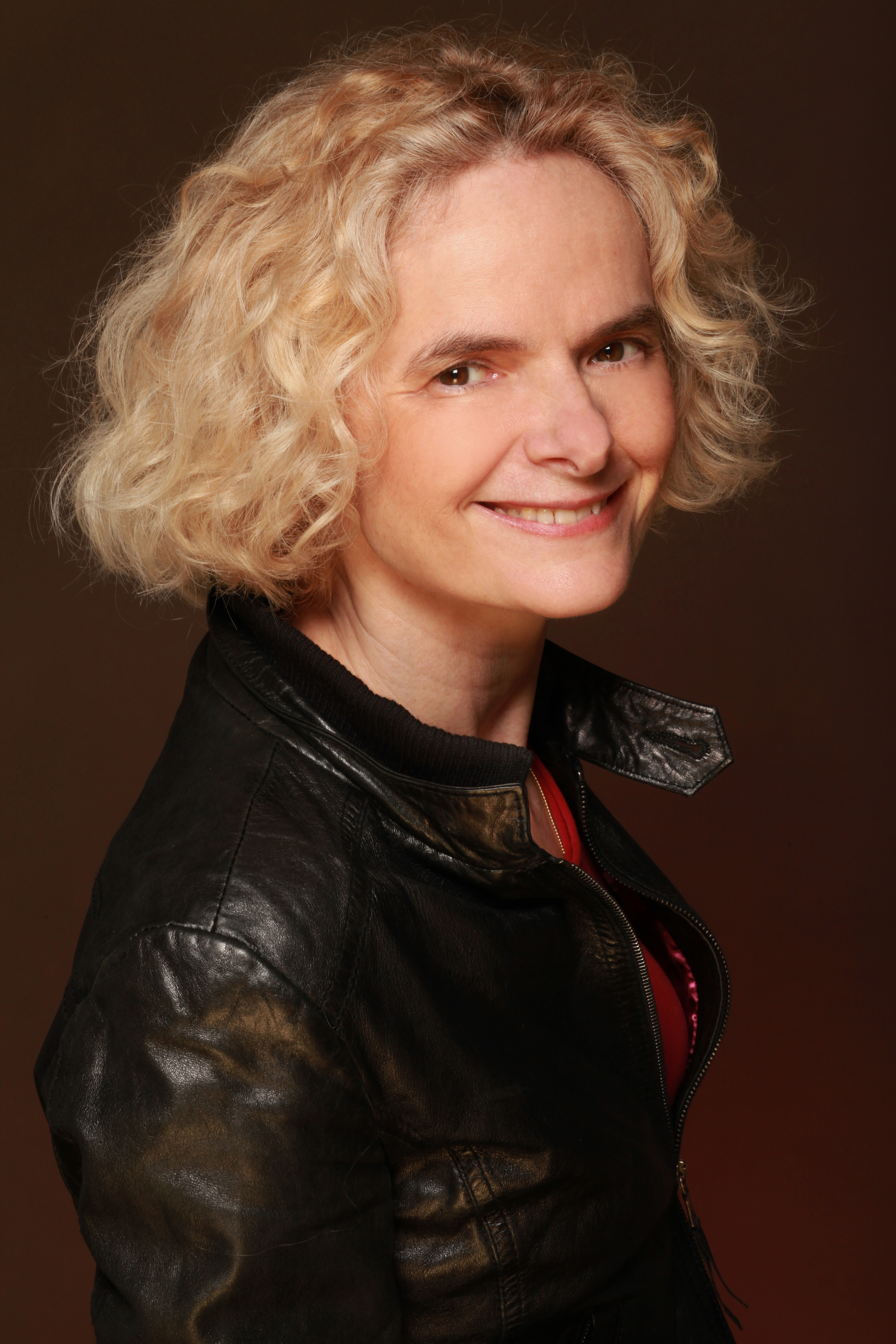

Director of the National Institute on Drug Abuse
- Incumbent
- Assumed office May 2003
- President: George W. Bush; Barack Obama; Donald Trump; Joe Biden
- Preceded by: Glen Hanson

Personal details
- Born: March 27, 1956 (age 70) Mexico City, Mexico
- Spouse: Stephen Adler
- Relations: Zinaida Volkova (grandmother); Leon Trotsky (great-grandfather); Olga Kameneva (great-great-aunt); Samuel Bronston (granduncle); William Bronston (second cousin, once removed)
- Education: National Autonomous University of Mexico (MD); New York University (Postdoctoral)

Nora D. Volkow (born 27 March 1956) is a Mexican-American psychiatrist. She has been the director of the National Institute on Drug Abuse (NIDA) since 2003, which is part of the National Institutes of Health (NIH).

== Early life and education ==
Born in Mexico City to a Jewish family, Volkow is a daughter of Esteban Volkov, whose mother Zinaida Volkova was the eldest daughter of the Russian communist revolutionary Leon Trotsky. Volkow and her three sisters grew up in Coyoacán in the house where Trotsky was killed (now the Leon Trotsky Museum).

Volkow was educated at the Modern American School, in Mexico City, and graduated M.D. from the National University of Mexico, before her postdoctoral training in psychiatry at New York University. At NYU, she worked in the laboratory of psychiatrist Jonathan Brodie, who was beginning to use positron emission tomography (PET) scans to study brain disorders.

== Career ==
After finishing psychiatry residency, she joined the faculty at the University of Texas Medical School at Houston, working on PET scan research projects in addition to clinical duties. She conducted research work with Professor Alan Swann, now at Baylor, leaving to the Department of Energy's Brookhaven National Laboratory (BNL) in Upton, New York, in 1987.

Volkow spent most of her professional career at Brookhaven, where she held several leadership positions. She was first a researcher, and then Director of Nuclear Medicine, Director of the NIDA-DOE Regional Neuroimaging Center at BNL, and finally Associate Director for Life Sciences at BNL. She was also an associate professor at Stony Brook University and associate dean of its School of Medicine at BNL.

=== Disease model of addiction ===
Volkow's imaging studies of the brains of people addicted to drugs have helped to clarify the mechanisms of drug addiction. At Brookhaven, PET scanning was being used to study the brain in people with schizophrenia. When Volkow moved to the University of Texas, studying patients with schizophrenia was not an option, but studying patients with cocaine addiction was possible.

Volkow and colleagues studied the distribution of blood flow in the brain of chronic cocaine users and control patients who did not use cocaine. They found decreased blood flow to the prefrontal cortex of cocaine users, that continued after ten days of withdrawal from cocaine use. This research has played a part in changing the public's view of drug addiction, from that of a moral violation or character flaw to an understanding that pathological changes to brain structure make it very difficult for addicts to give up their addictions.

Volkow concludes that abnormalities in the prefrontal cortex create a feeling of need or craving that people with addictions find difficult to prevent. She argues that this makes it difficult to override compulsions by exercising cognitive control. The main areas affected are the orbitofrontal cortex, which maintains attention to goals, and the anterior cingulate cortex, that mediates the capacity to monitor and select action plans. Both areas receive stimulation from dopamine neurons that originate in the ventral tegmental area. A steady influx of dopamine makes it difficult to shift attention away from the goal of attaining drugs. It also fastens attention to the motivational value of drugs, not pleasure. Volkow suggests that people with addictions are caught in a vicious circle of physical brain changes and the psychological consequences of those changes, leading to further changes.

=== National Institute on Drug Abuse ===
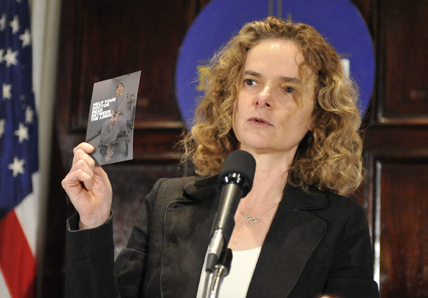
Nora Volkow, director of the National Institute on Drug Abuse

In 2003 Volkow became director of NIDA. As director, she has focused on enacting policies that address how stigma, socioeconomic status, health disparities and criminalization of drug use contribute to and exacerbate substance use disorders in the United States.

In 2013, Volkow visited the Dalai Lama at his residence in Dharamshala, Himachal Pradesh, India, where she took part in a dialogue with him about addiction science as part of a five-day conference of the Mind and Life Institute.

=== Science communication and public advocacy ===
In 2014, Volkow participated in an event organized by The Moth at a World Science Festival, where scientists, writers and artists told stories of their personal relationships with science. During this time, she discussed her family history and how it furthered her ambition to pursue science in order to positively influence others.

In a 2014 TEDMED talk titled "Why do our brains get addicted?", Volkow applied the lens of addiction to the obesity epidemic, discussing parallels between compulsive overeating and drug addiction.

== Awards and recognition ==
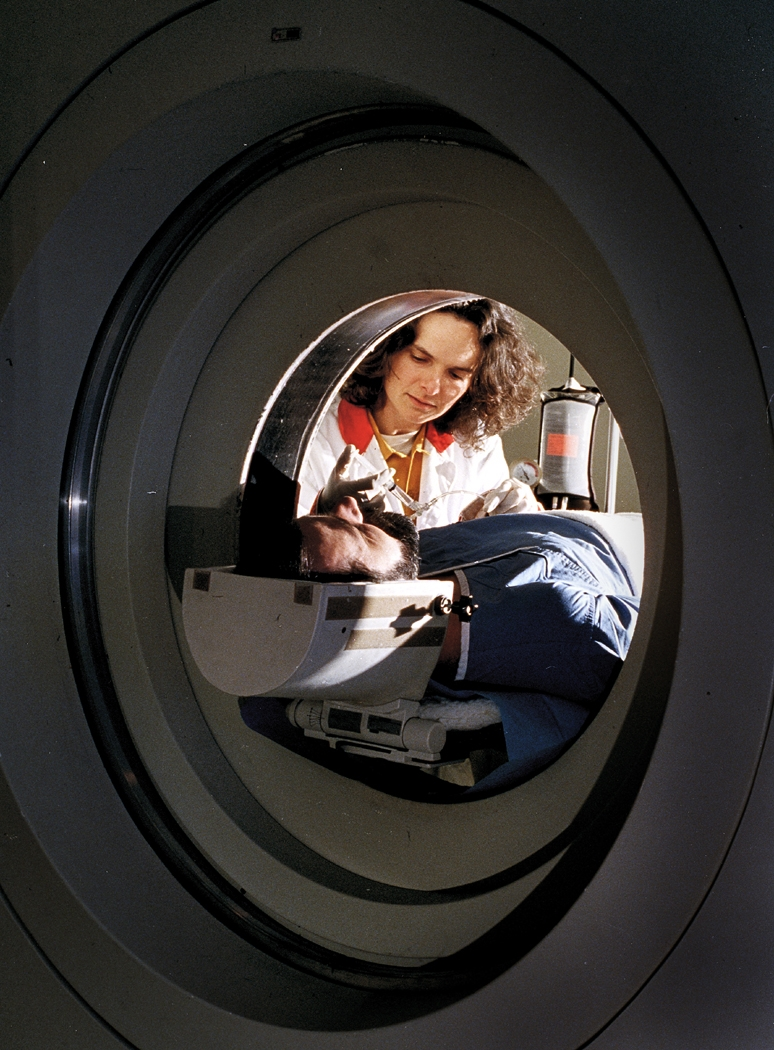
With patient in PET scan

In 2000, U.S. News & World Report named Volkow its "Innovator of the Year". Newsweek included her in its "Who's Next 2007" list of 21 people expected to be newsmakers that year, and Time named her to the 2007 Time 100. Washingtonian magazine listed her among Washington's 100 most powerful women in 2011. In 2013, she was a finalist for the Samuel J. Heyman Service to America Medal in the science and environment category.

In 2007, NIDA and the National Institute on Alcohol Abuse and Alcoholism received an Emmy Award for the HBO documentary series The Addiction Project; Volkow represented NIDA in receiving the award. She received Baylor College of Medicine's Joan and Stanford Alexander Award in Psychiatry in 2011, in recognition of her work "demonstrating that drug addiction is a disease of the human brain", the Hispanic Scientist of the Year Award from the Museum of Science & Industry (Tampa) in 2012, the Child Mind Institute's 2013 Distinguished Scientist Award, and the American Medical Association's Nathan Davis Award for Outstanding Government Service in 2020. She is a member of the National Academy of Medicine.

== Personal life ==
Volkow is married to Stephen Adler, a radioimaging physicist at the National Cancer Institute.

== Bibliography ==
- Volkow, Nora D. (September 2020). "The stigma of addiction". Scientific American. 323 (3): 10. doi:10.1038/scientificamerican0920-10. PMID 39014669.
