= Elmer Lower =

American broadcast journalist

Elmer Wilson Lower (March 7, 1913 – July 26, 2011) was an American journalist and president of ABC News from 1963 to 1974.

Lower received a bachelor of journalism degree from the University of Missouri in 1933. Afterwards, he worked for 20 years for a variety of newspapers in Kentucky, Michigan, Ohio and Missouri, specializing in political beats.

Lower was named president of ABC News in 1963. During his tenure, he was responsible for hiring Peter Jennings, Ted Koppel, Frank Reynolds, and Sam Donaldson. In that time, the news division grew from 250 to 750 employees, and the evening news expanded from 15 minutes to 30 minutes. He joined the faculty of his alma mater in 1978, and was appointed dean of the School of Journalism for the 1982-1983 academic year. Lower was honored with a lifetime achievement Emmy award in 1975.

Lower died on July 26, 2011, at the age of 98 in Vero Beach, Florida.

== Accolades ==
- 1975: Paul White Award, Radio Television Digital News Association
