= Wehmeier =

Wehmeier is a surname. Notable people with the surname include:

- Gerhard Wehmeier (1935–2009), German Old Testament Scholar
- Herm Wehmeier (1927–1973), American baseball player
- Kai Wehmeier (born 1968), German-American philosopher and logician

== See also ==
- Wehmeyer
