= William Pollin =

American psychiatrist (1922–2008)

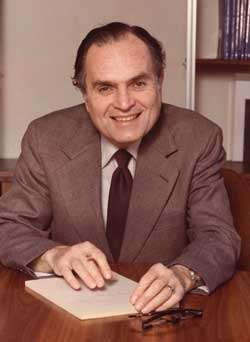

Director of the National Institute on Drug Abuse
- In office 1979–1985
- Preceded by: Robert DuPont
- Succeeded by: Charles R. Schuster

Personal details
- Born: May 13, 1922 Philadelphia, Pennsylvania, U.S.
- Died: January 25, 2008 (aged 85) Bethesda, Maryland, U.S.
- Spouse: Tersea
- Children: 2
- Education: Columbia University

Military service
- Allegiance: United States Navy
- Branch/service: United States Merchant Marine
- Battles/wars: World War II

Dr. William Pollin (May 13, 1922 – January 25, 2008) was a psychiatrist who served as the second director of the National Institute on Drug Abuse and as a staff member of the National Institute of Mental Health. He is best remembered as the person who "declared cigarette smoking was more addictive than alcohol or heroin."

== Early life ==
Pollin was born in Philadelphia, Pennsylvania and served as a merchant marine during World War II. Following the war, he attended and graduated from the City College of New York before attending Columbia University. He graduated from Columbia's medical school in 1952.

== Career ==
NIDA Director Nora Volkow summarized Dr. Pollin's contributions to psychiatry and to drug control policy as follows:

At NIMH he contributed to early studies which examined pairs of twins to determine the connection between development of schizophrenia and obstetrical complications and various other neurological abnormalities. At NIDA he was one of the key researchers who changed the medical view of tobacco smoking from an unhealthy habit to a diagnosable drug addiction—after which cigarette makers nicknamed him "Doctor Death" to the tobacco industry. Dr. Pollin emphasized supporting family-oriented drug prevention programs and during this time the rate of cannabis abuse in high school children declined.

== Personal life ==
Pollin married his first wife, Marilyn, in 1951. She died in 1990. He remarried in 1993.

== Death ==
Pollin died of a heart attack at Suburban Hospital in Bethesda, Maryland. He was survived by his wife of 15 years, Teresa Pollin, as well as his two children from his first marriage; his stepson; and seven grandchildren.
