= CBC Opera Company =

Canadian opera company

The CBC Opera Company (CBCOC) was a Canadian opera company established by the Canadian Broadcasting Corporation with the purposes of performing operas for live broadcast on CBC Radio. Established in 1948, Charles Jennings served as chairman of the company's board of directors and conductor Nicholas Goldschmidt was the music director of the company with Geoffrey Waddington and Arnold Walter also serving as music advisors. The broadcasts of the company were produced by Harry J. Boyle and Terence Gibbs, and Herman Geiger-Torel worked as vocal coach and stage director for the company.

The CBOC presented its inaugural broadcast on October 20, 1948; performing Giacomo Puccini's La bohème with Mary Morrison as Mimì, Jimmie Shields as Rodolfo, Beth Corrigan as Musetta, and Edmund Hockridge as Marcello. The company presented three more operas that first season: Orfeo ed Euridice, La Traviata, and Don Giovanni. The CBOC continued to present an annual season of operas through 1955; with the 1954–1955 season being its last regular season. However, the company still broadcast with less frequency through 1959.
