= Linda Chang =

American neurologist

Academic background
- Education: University of Maryland, College Park (BS)

Academic work
- Discipline: Neurology
- Notable works: Research in neuroimaging and genetics of neurological disorders

Linda Chang is an American neurologist. She is a professor of diagnostic radiology and nuclear medicine and the vice-chair for faculty development at University of Maryland School of Medicine.

== Education ==
Chang completed a bachelor of science in biochemistry through the honors program at University of Maryland, College Park in 1981. Chang earned a master of science in physiology and biophysics from Georgetown University in 1982. Chang completed a medical doctorate at Georgetown University School of Medicine in 1986. Chang completed a residency in neurology at Ronald Reagan UCLA Medical Center in 1990. She completed a fellowship at UCLA in 1991 in neuromuscular diseases and electrophysiology with mentor Thomas L. Anderson. In 1992, she completed a research fellowship in neuroimaging studies in dementia with mentor Bruce Miller at UCLA.

== Career ==
From 1992 to 1999, Chang was an assistant professor of neurology at UCLA School of Medicine. She was an associate professor from 1999 to 2000. Chang was a scientist and the chair of the medical department at Brookhaven National Laboratory from 2000 to 2004. She worked as a professor of medicine at the John A. Burns School of Medicine at University of Hawaii at Manoa from 2004 to 2017. Starting in 2017, she is an adjunct clinical professor at the University of Hawaii and an adjunct professor in the department of neurology at Johns Hopkins School of Medicine. She is a professor of neurology, diagnostic radiology, and nuclear medicine and the vice-chair for faculty development at University of Maryland School of Medicine.

=== Research ===
Chang's research focuses on the application of advanced neuroimaging techniques and genetics in the study of various neurological disorders, HIV, substance use disorders and brain development and aging.

== Awards and honors ==
Chang was elected a fellow of the American Academy of Neurology in 2003. In 2005, she was elected a member of the American College of Neuropsychopharmacology. Chang was elected as a fellow member of the International Society of Magnetic Resonance in Medicine in 2008. She became a fellow member of the American Neurological Association in 2012. In 2021, she received the National Institute on Drug Abuse Avant Garde Award for HIV/AIDS and Substance Use Disorder Research.
