= Charles Jennings (journalist) =

Canadian journalist (1908–1973)

- Born: January 2, 1908; Toronto, Ontario, Canada
- Died: July 13, 1973 (aged 65); Ottawa, Ontario, Canada
- Education: Trinity College, University of Toronto
- Occupation: Journalist
- Spouse: Elizabeth Jennings
- Children: Peter Jennings; Sarah Jennings

Charles Jennings (January 2, 1908 – July 13, 1973) was a Canadian journalist for the CBC and the father of ABC news anchor Peter Jennings.

Born in Toronto, Ontario, Jennings was educated at North Toronto Collegiate and then Trinity College, University of Toronto.

In 1928, he started a job as a radio announcer at CKGW (now CBLA) in Toronto, Ontario, Canada. Then, he worked in New York briefly before returning to Canada to work for the Canadian Radio Broadcasting Commission where he became chief announcer and was Canada's first national news anchor reading the nightly Canadian Press News. He stayed with the CRBC's successor, the Canadian Broadcasting Corporation and, in 1964, he became vice-president of the CBC, retiring in 1971. During his tenure at the CBC he served as the chairman of the CBC Opera Company.

At the time of his death, Charles Jennings left behind his wife, Elizabeth, and his children, the younger, journalist and commentator Sarah, and the older, broadcaster Peter.
