= Inés Cifuentes =

Seismologist and educator

- Born: April 26, 1954; London, England
- Died: 16 December 2013 (aged 59); Takoma Park, Maryland, US
- Education: Swarthmore College; Stanford University; Columbia University; Institut de Physique du Globe de Paris
- Scientific career
- Fields: Seismology; Science education
- Workplaces: US Geological Survey; Carnegie Academy for Science Education; American Geophysical Union

Inés Lucia Cifuentes (April 26, 1954 – December 16, 2013) was an English-born American seismologist and educator. From 1994 to 2005, she was director of the Carnegie Academy for Science Education (CASE).

== Early life ==
Born in London, Inés Cifuentes was the child of Ecuadorian father and American mother. Her father was born in Quito, Ecuador, whereas her mother was born in New York City. Her parents both held positions for the UN which allowed Inés to be able to receive an education all throughout Latin America. While growing up, she lived in Ecuador, Chile, Paraguay and Guatemala. It was during her stay in Chile where she discovered her passion for science. In 1960, a deadly earthquake shook Santiago, Chile, resulting in the death of 1000 people. It was from this moment on that Inés knew she wanted to be a seismologist. In 1972, she graduated from Albert Einstein High School in Kensington, Maryland and went on to receive a BSc in physics from Swarthmore College and a MSc in geophysics from Stanford University in 1979.

== Career ==
She was hired by the United States Geological Survey at Menlo Park. Even though her faculty advisor tried to make her leave the program, Cifuentes earned a PhD from Columbia University in 1988, becoming the first woman to receive a doctorate in seismology from Columbia. She pursued post-doctoral studies at the Institut de Physique du Globe de Paris. On her return to the United States, she joined the Carnegie Academy for Science Education. In 2005, she joined the American Geophysical Union as Manager of Education and Career Services.

== Personal life ==
Inés Cifuentes married Frank Aikman in 1983. The couple had two children: Benjamin C. Aikman and Julia N.Aikman.

== Contributions to Science & Education ==
In 2006, she was named as the sixth recipient of the National Hispanic scientist of the year by the Museum of Science & Industry in Tampa. In 2007, she received the math and science award from the Hispanic Heritage Foundation. She assisted in establishing and became a director of Carnegie Academy for Science Education (CASE) where she was responsible for training Washington public elementary school teachers in both science and effective teaching methods. Cifuentes taught then science and math within a summer program and then worked with them during the year at their designated schools.

Inés Cifuentes made an effort in the early 2000s to open a charter school to aid minority students. Unfortunately, she was unsuccessful in her efforts. Her plan was to set up a Jaime Escalante Public Charter School in Silver Spring in hopes in helping the SAT scores of minority students.

Cifuentes was also a board president of Casa de Maryland. This is an organization that focusing on the rights of immigrants. She additionally was a co-chairmen on the board of directors for the dance company Dance Exchange in Takoma Park.

== Death ==
She died of breast cancer at home in Takoma Park at the age of 59.
