= National Institute on Drug Abuse =

U.S. health research institute

Coordinates: 39.04770°N 77.11134°W

Agency overview
- Headquarters: 6001 Executive Blvd North Bethesda, Maryland 20852
- Annual budget: $1.05 billion
- Agency executive: Nora Volkow, Director
- Parent department: U.S. Department of Health and Human Services
- Parent agency: National Institutes of Health
- Website: nida.nih.gov

The National Institute on Drug Abuse (NIDA) is a United States federal government research institute whose mission is to "advance science on the causes and consequences of drug use and addiction and to apply that knowledge to improve individual and public health."

The institute has conducted an in-depth study of addiction according to its biological, behavioral and social components. It has also supported many treatments such as nicotine patches and gums, and performed research into AIDS and other drug-related diseases. Its monopoly on the supply of research-grade marijuana has proved controversial.

== History ==
In 1935, a research facility (named the Addiction Research Center in 1948) was established in Lexington, Kentucky as part of a USPHS hospital.

On June 17, 1971, Richard Nixon announced the Special Action Office for Drug Abuse Prevention, led by psychiatrist Jerome Jaffe. In 1974, it was folded into the National Institute on Drug Abuse.

In 1974, the Drug Abuse Warning Network (DAWN) and National Household Survey on Drug Abuse (NHSDA) were created.

In 1974, NIDA was established as part of the Alcohol, Drug Abuse, and Mental Health Administration and given authority over the DAWN and NHSDA programs. The Monitoring the Future Survey, which surveys high school seniors, was initiated in 1975; in 1991, it was expanded to include 8th and 10th graders.

In October 1992, NIDA became part of the National Institutes of Health (NIH), United States Department of Health and Human Services. At that time, responsibility for the DAWN and NHSDA programs were transferred to the Substance Abuse and Mental Health Services Administration (SAMHSA). NIDA is organized into divisions and offices, each of which is involved with programs of drug abuse research. Nora Volkow, MD, has been the director of NIDA since 2003.

According to NIH:

One of NIDA's most important achievements has been the use of science to clarify central concepts in the field of drug abuse...When NIDA began, correct approaches to drug policy and drug treatment were often thought to hinge on determining whether a particular drug was "physically addicting" or only "psychologically addicting." We now know that addiction has biological, behavioral and social components. It is best defined as a chronic, relapsing brain disorder characterized by compulsive, often uncontrollable drug craving, seeking, and use, even in the face of negative health and social consequences. NIDA-supported research has also shown that this compulsion results from specific drug effects in the brain. This definition opens the way for broad strategies and common approaches to all drug addiction.

The physical/psychological addiction dichotomy is reflected in the Controlled Substances Act's criteria for drug scheduling. Placement in Schedule III, for instance, requires a finding that "abuse of the drug or other substance may lead to moderate or low physical dependence or high psychological dependence." The view espoused by former NIDA director Alan I. Leshner, which places more emphasis on the "compulsive, uncontrollable" aspect of addictive drug use than on physical withdrawal symptoms, explains NIDA's differing treatment of morphine and cannabis. Morphine is physically addictive, and users of heroin and other opiate-derived drugs become physically and psychologically dependent on the high from the opiates, which drives them to seek the drug and perform acts they might not normally engage in (like exchanging drugs for sex acts or sharing needles with another user). In contrast, marijuana is not physically addictive, though some users do become psychologically dependent on the drug. Jon Gettman and other supporters of removal of cannabis from Schedule I of the Controlled Substances Act have questioned the legality of basing scheduling decisions on such considerations rather than on physical addiction and physical harm; Gettman stated, "If the federal government wants to keep marijuana in schedule 1, or if they believe that placing marijuana in schedule 2 is a viable policy, then we're going to cross-examine under oath and penalty of perjury every HHS official and scientist who claims that marijuana use is as dangerous as the use of cocaine or heroin." NIDA's viewpoint is supported by the fact that the CSA lists not only physical addictiveness but also "history and current pattern of abuse" and "scope, duration, and significance of abuse" among the factors to be considered in drug scheduling. Indeed, cannabis' retention in Schedule I has been partly due to findings in these areas by FDA, SAMHSA, and NIDA. The January 17, 2001 document Basis for the Recommendation for Maintaining Marijuana in Schedule I of the Controlled Substances Act specifically cites SAMHSA's National Household Survey on Drug Abuse, NIDA's Monitoring the Future survey, SAMHSA's Drug Abuse Warning Network, and NIDA's Community Epidemiology Work Group data.

NIDA has supported many treatments for drug addiction. NIDA-supported studies led to the use of nicotine patches and gums for nicotine addiction treatment. NIDA scientists also developed LAAM, which is used for heroin addiction treatment. Other treatments that were the subject of NIDA research include naltrexone and buprenorphine. NIDA states, "By conservative estimates, every $1 spent on drug addiction saves society $4 to $7 in criminal justice and health care costs", which points to the need for spending funds on effective prevention and treatment programs based on evidence, rather than criminal sanctions that do not impact drug use.

NIDA has also conducted research into diseases associated with drug use, such as AIDS and Hepatitis. NIDA views drug treatment as a means of modifying risky behavior such as unprotected sex and sharing needles. NIDA has also funded studies dealing with harm reduction. A NIDA-supported study on pregnant drug users noted, "professionals in research and treatment must learn to settle for less because insisting on total abstinence may exacerbate the problem." This study was conducted by Marsha Rosenbaum of the Lindesmith Center, an organization that has been critical of federal drug policies.

In the 1990s, NIDA funded research by John W. Huffman that was focused on making a drug to target endocannabinoid receptors in the body; this resulted in the discovery of a variety of substances that are now being sold as Spice, K2, etc.

In 2006, NIDA received an annual budget of $1.01 billion. The U.S. government says NIDA funds more than 85 percent of the world's research about the health aspects of drug abuse and addiction.

== Past directors ==
Past directors from 1973 – present

No.	Portrait	Director	Took office	Left office	Refs.
1		Robert DuPont	1973	1978	
2		William Pollin	1979	1985	
3		Charles R. Schuster	1986	1992	
acting		Richard A. Millstein	1992	1994	
4		Alan I. Leshner	1994	November 30, 2001	
acting		Glen R. Hanson	December 1, 2001	April 30, 2003	
5		Nora Volkow	May 1, 2003	Present	

== Publications ==
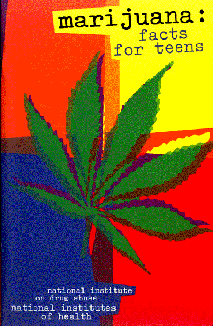
A NIDA educational pamphlet

NIDA Notes is a bimonthly newsletter that has been published since 1985. Its scope covers drug abuse research in the areas of treatment and prevention, epidemiology, neuroscience, behavioral science, health services, and AIDS. NIDA-supported studies are also published in other journals. NIDA publishes educational materials as well which aim to provide pertinent facts to teenagers who will be making drug use decisions and to parents. This literature has sometimes been used by legalization advocates to advance their points, an example being NIDA's admittal that "many young people who use marijuana do not go on to use other drugs."

== Controversial research ==
Drug abuse, in addition to being an area of scientific research, is also a major subject of public policy debate. Accordingly, elected officials have sometimes attempted to shape the debate by introducing legislation in reference to NIDA research. In 2004, Congressman Mark Souder introduced the Safe and Effective Drug Act, calling for a "meta-analysis of existing medical marijuana data." It was criticized for being limited to smoked cannabis (rather than vaporizers and other methods of ingestion) and not requiring any new research. In some cases, NIDA has held its ground when its more moderate stances were questioned by legislators favoring a hard-line approach. On April 27, 2004, Souder sent NIH Director Elias A. Zerhouni a letter criticizing needle exchange programs for causing increases in infection rates. The Harm Reduction Coalition responded with its concerns, and NIDA Director Nora Volkow wrote a letter stating:

While it is not feasible to do a randomized controlled trial of the effectiveness of needle or syringe exchange programs (NEPs/SEPs) in reducing HIV incidence, the majority of studies have shown that NEPs/SEPs are strongly associated with reductions in the spread of HIV when used as a component of comprehensive approach to HIV prevention. NEPs/SEPs increase the availability of sterile syringes and other injection equipment, and for exchange participants, this decreases the fraction of needles in circulation that are contaminated. This lower fraction of contaminated needles reduces the risk of injection with a contaminated needle and lowers the risk of HIV transmission. In addition to decreasing HIV infected needles in circulation through the physical exchange of syringes, most NEPs/SEPs are part of a comprehensive HIV prevention effort that may include education on risk reduction, and referral to drug addiction treatment, job or other social services, and these interventions may be responsible for a significant part of the overall effectiveness of NEPs/SEPs. NEPs/SEPs also provide an opportunity to reach out to populations that are often difficult to engage in treatment. NIDA will continue to work with research communities and various stakeholders to ensure that the research findings surrounding NEPs/SEPs are presented in a manner consistent with the current state of science. I would like to thank you once again for your interest and your role in reducing the health burden of these diseases on our Nation's citizens.

DAWN, or the Drug Abuse Warning Network, is a program to collect statistics on the frequency of emergency department mentions of use of different types of drugs. This information is widely cited by drug policy officials, who have sometimes confused drug-related episodes—emergency department visits induced by drugs—with drug mentions. The Wisconsin Department of Justice claimed that "In Wisconsin, marijuana overdose visits in emergency rooms equal to heroin or morphine [sic], twice as common as Valium." Common Sense for Drug Policy called this as a distortion, noting, "The federal DAWN report itself notes that reports of marijuana do not mean people are going to the hospital for a marijuana overdose, it only means that people going to the hospital for a drug overdose mention marijuana as a drug they use."

The National Survey on Drug Use and Health is an annual study of American drug use patterns. According to NIDA, "The data collection method is in–person interviews conducted with a sample of individuals at their place of residence. ACASI provides a highly private and confidential means of responding to questions to increase the level of honest reporting of illicit drug use and other sensitive behavior." Sixty-eight thousand people were interviewed in 2003, with a weighted response rate for interviewing of 73 percent. Like DAWN, the Survey often draws criticism because of how the data is used by drug policy officials. Rob Kampia of Marijuana Policy Project stated in a September 5, 2002 press release,

The government reaches that exact same conclusion regardless of whether drug use is going up, down, or staying the same. If use is going up they say, 'We're in a drug abuse emergency; we need to crack down harder.' If use is going down, they say, 'Our strategy is working; we need to crack down harder.' A cynic might think they had made up their minds before even looking at the data.

NIDA literature and National Institute of Mental Health (NIMH) research frequently contradict each other. For instance, in the 1980s and 1990s, NIMH researchers found that dopamine plays only a marginal role in marijuana's psychoactive effects. Years later, however, NIDA educational materials continued to warn of the danger of dopamine-related marijuana addiction. NIDA appears to be backing off of these dopamine claims, adding disclaimers to its teaching packets that the interaction of THC with the reward system is not fully understood.

The NIDA also funded the research of John W. Huffman who first synthesized many novel cannabinoids. This compounds are now being sold all around the world as pure compounds or mixed with herbals known as spices. The fact that NIDA has allowed and paid for the synthesis of these new cannabinoids without recommending human consumption research is a topic of concern, especially since some of these JWH substances were recently classified under Schedule I of the Controlled Substances Act via emergency legislation.

== Medical marijuana monopoly ==
NIDA has inside the US a government granted monopoly on the production of medical marijuana for research purposes. In the past, the institute has refused to supply marijuana to researchers who had obtained all other necessary federal permits. Medical marijuana researchers and activists claim that NIDA, which is not supposed to be a regulatory organization, does not have the authority to effectively regulate who does and does not get to do research with medical marijuana. Jag Davies of the Multidisciplinary Association for Psychedelic Studies (MAPS) writes in MAPS Bulletin:

Currently, the National Institute on Drug Abuse (NIDA) has a monopoly on the supply of research-grade marijuana, but no other Schedule I drug, that can be used in FDA-approved research. NIDA uses its monopoly power to obstruct research that conflicts with its vested interests. MAPS had two of its FDA-approved medical marijuana protocols rejected by NIDA, preventing the studies from taking place. MAPS has also been trying without success for almost four years to purchase 10 grams of marijuana from NIDA for research into the constituents of the vapor from marijuana vaporizers, a non-smoking drug delivery method that has already been used in one FDA-approved human study.

NIDA administers a contract with the University of Mississippi to grow the nation's only legal cannabis crop for medical and research purposes, including the Compassionate Investigational New Drug program. A Fast Company article pointed out, "Based on the photographic evidence, NIDA's concoction of seeds, stems, and leaves more closely resembles dried cat brier than cannabis". An article in Mother Jones describes their crop as "brown, stems-and-seeds-laden, low-potency pot—what's known on the streets as 'schwag'". United States federal law currently registers cannabis as a Schedule I drug. Medical marijuana researchers typically prefer to use high-potency marijuana, but NIDA's National Advisory Council on Drug Abuse has been reluctant to provide cannabis with high THC levels, citing safety concerns:

Most clinical studies have been conducted using cannabis cigarettes with a potency of 2–4% THC. However, it is anticipated that there will be requests for cannabis cigarettes with a higher potency or with other mixes of cannabinoids. For example, NIDA has received a request for cigarettes with an 8% potency. The subcommittee notes that very little is known about the clinical pharmacology of this higher potency. Thus, while NIDA research has provided a large body of literature related to the clinical pharmacology of cannabis, research is still needed to establish the safety of new dosage forms and new formulations.

Speaking before the National Advisory Council on Drug Abuse, Rob Kampia of the Marijuana Policy Project criticized NIDA for refusing to provide researcher Donald Abrams with marijuana for his studies, stating that "after nine months of delay, Leshner rejected Abrams' request for marijuana, on what we believe are political grounds that the FDA-approved protocol is inadequate."

In May 2006, the Boston Globe reported that:

Then again, it's not in NIDA's job description-or even, perhaps, in NIDA's interests-to grow a world-class marijuana crop. The institute's director, Nora Volkow, has stressed that it's "not NIDA's mission to study the medicinal use of marijuana or to advocate for the establishment of facilities to support this research." Since NIDA's stated mission "is to lead the Nation in bringing the power of science to bear on drug abuse and addiction," federally supported marijuana research will logically tilt toward the potential harms, not benefits, of cannabis.

== Ricaurte's monkeys ==
NIDA has drawn criticism for continuing to provide funding to George Ricaurte, who in 2002 conducted a study that was widely touted as proving that MDMA (ecstasy) caused dopaminergic neurotoxicity in monkeys. His paper "Severe Dopaminergic Neurotoxicity in Primates After a Common Recreational Dose Regimen of MDMA ('Ecstasy')" in Science was later retracted after it became clear that the monkeys had in fact been injected not with MDMA, but with extremely high doses of methamphetamine. A FOIA request was subsequently filed by MAPS to find out more about the research and NIDA's involvement in it.

Alan Leshner, publisher of Science and former director of the National Institute on Drug Abuse (NIDA), has come under fire for endorsing the botched study at its time of publication... Leshner did help NIDA bring home the bacon: NIDA's budget for Ecstasy research has more than quadrupled over the past five years, from $3.4 million to $15.8 million; the agency funds 85 percent of the world's drug-abuse research. In 2001, Leshner testified before a Senate subcommittee on "Ecstasy Abuse and Control"; critics say Leshner manipulated brain scans from a 2000 study by Dr. Linda Chang showing no difference between Ecstasy users and control subjects. But NIDA insists it is independent from political pressures. "We don't set policy; we don't create laws," says Beverly Jackson, the agency's spokesperson.

— Village Voice 2004

== Effectiveness of anti-marijuana ad campaigns ==
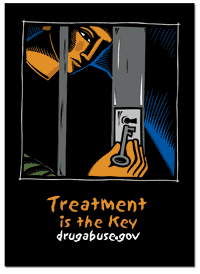
Treatment art card

In February 2005, Westat, a research company hired by NIDA and funded by The White House Office of National Drug Control Policy, reported on its five-year study of the government ad campaigns aimed at dissuading teens from using marijuana, campaigns that cost more than $1 billion between 1998 and 2004. The study found that the ads did not work: "greater exposure to the campaign was associated with weaker anti-drug norms and increases in the perceptions that others use marijuana." NIDA leaders and the White House drug office did not release the Westat report for a year and a half. NIDA dated Westat's report as "delivered" in June 2006. In fact, it was delivered in February 2005, according to the Government Accountability Office, the federal watchdog agency charged with reviewing the study.

== Office of Inspector General (OIG) investigations of NIDA commercial partnerships ==
On the 26 October 2011, the OIG published its results from an audit of a contract between the National Institute on Drug Abuse (NIDA) and Charles River Laboratories, Inc., which read in part:

Our review found that during fiscal years 2007 through 2009, NIH's National Institute on Drug Abuse (NIDA) did not comply with the time and amount requirements specified in appropriations statutes in administering contract HHSN271-2007-00009C (the Contract) with Charles River Laboratories, Inc.

NIDA violated both the bona fide needs rule and the Antideficiency Act by obligating funds in advance of an appropriation. The initial contract action obligated funds only for program year 1 (July 9, 2007, through July 8, 2008). However, NIDA twice modified the contract to obligate fiscal year 2007 funds through July 8, 2010, and May 1, 2011, respectively. Because the Contract was for severable services, NIDA should have obligated only those fiscal year 2007 funds needed for program year 1.

Additionally, NIDA violated the bona fide needs rule by obligating more funds than it needed for program year 1 and using those funds to pay for costs incurred after program year 1. Using the program year estimates provided in the Contract as evidence of the bona fide need, NIDA must resolve these violations by deobligating $14.9 million ($20.2 million less $5.3 million) of fiscal year 2007 funds that were obligated in excess of the agency's bona fide need for program year 1 and obligating the appropriate fiscal year funds for the program years in which the services were provided. If NIDA does not have adequate fiscal year funds available, it will violate the Antideficiency Act for these fiscal years as well.

Furthermore, although NIDA estimated that it would require $5.3 million for program year 1 and $5.2 million for program year 2, at the time of our audit, it had expended only $5.0 million and $4.4 million program years 1 and 2, respectively. NIDA may not use the remaining funds for costs incurred in subsequent program years. Rather, NIDA will need to deobligate an additional $0.3 million ($5.3 million less $5.0 million) of fiscal year 2007 appropriations and $0.8 million ($5.2 million less $4.4 million) of fiscal year 2008 appropriations if it is determined that they are no longer needed during their period of availability.

Our audit also determined that the NIH Office of Financial Management erroneously paid an invoice for $111,000 against the Contract. NIDA funded the Contract in compliance with the purpose requirements of appropriations statutes.

We recommended that NIDA:

1. Record the correct obligation for each program year against the appropriate fiscal year appropriations,
2. Record expenditures for each program year against the appropriate fiscal year appropriations,
3. Report an Antideficiency Act violation for expending fiscal year 2007 funds in advance of an appropriation,
4. Report an Antideficiency Act violation if adequate fiscal year 2009 and subsequent year funds are unavailable to cover obligations for subsequent program years,
5. Return funds that were not required for program years 1 and 2, and
6. Reverse the expenditure to the Contract for the $111,000 erroneous payment and charge the correct contract accordingly.

In written comments on our draft report, NIH concurred with the findings and agreed that the Contract is severable and should have been funded with the appropriation that was current when the services were performed. NIH said that HHS would report the Antideficiency Act violation and stated that the NIH Office of Financial Management corrected the erroneously paid invoice by reversing the $111,000 payment.

NIH did not address our recommendations to correct the improper funding for the first 3 program years of the Contract. Until NIH makes these adjustments, HHS cannot report the correct amount of its Antideficiency Act violation. Therefore, we continue to recommend that NIH record the correct Contract obligations and expenditures against the correct fiscal year funds.

== See also ==
- William Pollin, second director of NIDA, from 1975–1985
