= Peggy Wehmeyer =

American journalist

- Born: Margaret Wehmeyer; Oklahoma City, United States
- Occupation: Journalist
- Children: 2

Margaret "Peggy" Wehmeyer is an American journalist and op-ed writer contributing to The New York Times, Wall Street Journal, The Washington Post, and The Dallas Morning News. She also served for seven years as the religion correspondent on the ABC News television network, before becoming the host and managing editor of The World Vision Report.

Wehmeyer was born in Oklahoma City and was raised mostly in Barbados and Texas. An ethnic German Jew, she is religiously Christian. She is a graduate of the University of Texas in Austin. As a young woman, Wehmeyer worked and studied at Dallas Theological Seminary. In 1994, she was hired by ABC News, with the strong support of Peter Jennings, to become the first full-time religion correspondent on a national news network where she served for seven years. 20/20 and Good Morning America also aired her stories. Prior to her job at ABC, she worked at WFAA-TV in Dallas on the station's religion beat.

In 2002, she left ABC to become the host and managing editor of the World Vision Report, a public radio broadcast funded by the World Vision charitable organization. As host of The World Vision Report, Peggy reported on global stories about justice and poverty. She has received multiple awards including two Cine Golden Eagle Awards, the Columbus International Film and Video Festival Award and a New York Festivals award.

== Personal life ==
Wehmeyer has two adult daughters, Hannah Woods Buchannan (Assoc. Pastor, HPUMC) and Lauren Woods Meyer (Federal Public Defender). Her marriage to Mark Woods lasted until his death in 2008.
