= Illicit Drug Anti-Proliferation Act =

2003 United States federal law

Illicit Drug Anti-Proliferation Act of 2003
- Long title: A bill to prohibit an individual from knowingly opening, maintaining, managing, controlling, renting, leasing, making available for use, or profiting from any place for the purpose of manufacturing, distributing, or using any controlled substance, and for other purposes.
- Enacted by: the 108th United States Congress
- Effective: April 30, 2003

Codification
- Acts amended: Controlled Substances Act

Legislative history
- Introduced in the Senate as S. 226 by Joe Biden (D-DE) on January 28, 2003; Committee consideration by Judiciary; Signed into law by President George W. Bush on April 30, 2003

The Illicit Drug Anti-Proliferation Act of 2003 is a United States federal law enacted as a rider within the PROTECT Act on April 30, 2003. A substantially similar Act was proposed during the previous Congress as the Reducing Americans' Vulnerability to Ecstasy Act (RAVE Act).

== Provisions ==
The Act modified section 416(a) of the Controlled Substances Act (also known as the "crackhouse law" and codified at United States Code, 21 U.S.C. § 856(a)) to expand the section regarding "establishment of manufacturing operations", which previously outlawed maintaining, managing or owning any place used to manufacture, distribute or use drugs to include temporary or permanent uses of the premises.

The Act also created a civil penalty of $250,000 or "2 times the gross receipts, either known or estimated, that were derived from each violation that is attributable to the person", whichever was greater. Additionally, the Act recommended that the United States Sentencing Commission reconsider the then-current Federal sentencing guidelines with respect to offenses involving gamma-hydroxybutyric acid (GHB), stigmatized as a date rape drug.

== Legislative history ==
The bill, originally titled the Reducing Americans' Vulnerability to Ecstasy Act (RAVE ACT), was sponsored by Senator Joe Biden, along with cosponsors Chuck Grassley, Orrin Hatch, Joe Lieberman, Strom Thurmond, Patrick Leahy and Dick Durbin. (Note: Patrick Leahy and Richard Durbin withdrew their sponsorship of the bill in September 2002.) The bill was referred to the Senate Committee on the Judiciary on June 18, 2002. On June 27, 2002, it was reported out of the committee without written comment or amendment and placed on the Senate Legislative Calendar. On October 10, 2002, Senator Biden provided introductory remarks on the bill before the Senate.

The RAVE Act was also included as an amendment to the Domestic Security Enhancement Act of 2003, introduced on January 7, 2003, by Thomas Daschle (D-SD.) This bill also failed to pass.

It was reintroduced in the 108th United States Congress by Biden, under the name "Illicit Drug Anti-Proliferation Act", co-sponsored again by Grassley and Lieberman, and adding Dianne Feinstein and Gordon H. Smith. It was later attached to the PROTECT Act, which was aimed at prosecuting child sexual abuse, while it was in conference committee. The PROTECT Act was signed into law by President Bush on April 30, 2003.

== Criticism ==
The RAVE Act has discouraged rave organizers from providing medical assistance to attendants. The American Civil Liberties Union has criticized the legislation, arguing that the threat of Drug Enforcement Administration enforcement action leads to a chilling effect on speech and "unfairly punishes businesses for the crimes of their customers". The DEA has stated that the law will not be enforced against legitimate property owners and event promoters. Erin Treacy of the Florida International University College of Law has argued that the RAVE Act violates the First Amendment because it is overbroad and is intended to criminalize electronic music concerts.

== See also ==
- Methylenedioxymethamphetamine (MDMA, "ecstasy")
- Retracted article on neurotoxicity of ecstasy
