= George A. Ricaurte =

American neurologist

- Citizenship: United States

George A. Ricaurte /rɪˈkɑːrti/ is a neurologist and researcher who works at the Johns Hopkins School of Medicine in the Department of Neurology.

== Biography ==
Ricaurte received his MD from Northwestern University Medical School and his Ph.D. (Pharmacology) from the University of Chicago.

His clinical work and research focuses on Parkinson's disease and other movement disorders. His work centers on amphetamine-type drugs and their potential to damage monoamine neurons in the brain. Ricaurte is best known for investigating how methamphetamine damages dopamine neurons, and whether MDMA (ecstasy) damages serotonin neurons. The long-term goal of this neurotoxicology research is to help find ways to prevent or retard the progression of Parkinson's disease and related neurodegenerative disorders. His work also has implications for substance use disorders.

Ricaurte's retracted article on the neurotoxicity of ecstasy, originally published in Science, received attention after its findings suggested that a single night's use of MDMA could cause dopamine dysfunction. These results were considered surprising, as MDMA primarily increases the activity of serotonin. Ricaurte was unable to reproduce the results of the study, and consequently discovered that methamphetamine had accidentally been used instead of MDMA during the original research. The paper was retracted in 2003.

At the time of the original studies‘ release, the organisation MAPS was seeking approval for the use of MDMA to conduct research on psychedelic-assisted psychotherapy. The alarming nature of the studies’ results may have created a ‘speed bump’ for the approval process. Following the retraction, MAPS founder and director Rick Doblin called for a re-evaluation of all of Ricaurte’s work, due to his belief that the study was politically motivated. Whilst Ricaurte was still concerned of the dangers of MDMA, he stated in reference to MAPS research, "If subjects are fully informed of these risks and still chose to participate, and if the protocol has been deemed scientifically and ethically acceptable by the appropriate regulatory bodies, then it should be held to the same standards as other clinical research projects."
