= Museum of Science & Industry (Tampa) =

Science museum in Tampa, Florida, U.S.

Museum of Science & Innovation (MOSI)
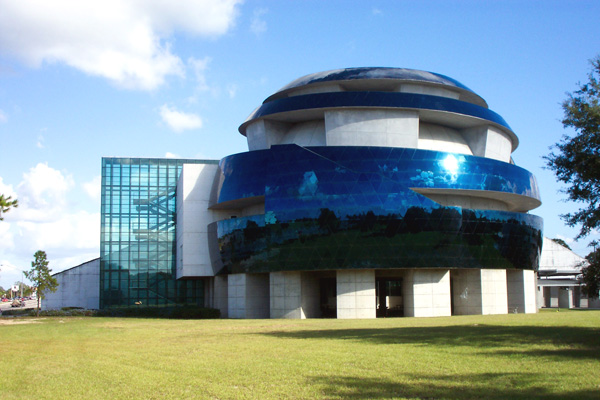
- The Museum of Science & Innovation's Saunders Planetarium & Digital Dome Theatre
- Former name: Museum of Science & Industry, Museum of Science and Natural History
- Established: 1962
- Location: 4801 East Fowler Ave; Tampa, Florida
- Type: Science museum
- Website: mosi.org

The Museum of Science & Innovation (MOSI) is a non-profit science museum located in Tampa, Florida's Uptown Innovation District, connected via pedestrian bridge to the neighboring University of South Florida.

Refitted with new digital projection technology, the museum's former IMAX Dome Theatre reopened in 2025 as the Saunders Planetarium & Digital Dome Theatre, the second-largest planetarium in the United States. The museum adopted its current name, an evolution of its longstanding name Museum of Science & Industry, in January 2026.

Permanent hands-on exhibits, a simulated lunar colony, and an area dedicated to temporary traveling exhibits occupy the museum's indoor spaces. Outdoor areas include a butterfly garden, science-themed miniature golf course, and children's playground.

MOSI's funding is provided from private donations, corporate sponsors, ticket and membership sales, and support from Hillsborough County and the City of Tampa.

== History ==
MOSI began in 1962 when Hillsborough County first approved funding for a youth museum in Sulphur Springs. Named the Museum of Science and Natural History, it provided natural science exhibits and education programs to children and adults. The name of the museum was changed to the Hillsborough County Museum in 1967. In 1976, the Hillsborough County Museum's advisory committee and staff started construction on a new museum in North Tampa that was to become the Museum of Science & Industry. The museum was completed in 1980 and permanently opened to the public on January 23, 1982.

In 1995 the construction of the 190,000 square foot science center with Florida's only IMAX Dome Theatre, extensive permanent and temporary exhibition galleries, a planetarium and a public library was completed. Further renovations were done in 1996, 2001, and 2005. MOSI was the largest science center in the southeast and the 5th largest in the U.S.

On August 13, 2017, MOSI closed 85% of its facility and its IMAX theater to save money. Many exhibits were removed and the remaining exhibits were relocated to the previous "Kids in Charge" section of the museum.

In 2022, after talks of building a new facility in downtown Tampa, the plans were scrapped due to financial concerns. Instead, MOSI focused on expanding its current location in North Tampa and adding new exhibits and programs. New permanent exhibits that opened in the following years included Flight Club Drone Zone, Be the Astronaut, LIVECycles Butterfly Garden, Dinovations Dig, and SciLinx Mini-Golf.

Through a "multimillion dollar" upgrade, the closed IMAX Dome Theatre received a new interior screen and digital projection system, replacing the previous film technology, along with star projection software, and re-opened in 2025 as the Saunders Planetarium & Digital Dome Theatre. Adopting a name that "reflects the recent history here at MOSI and the future, the path forward," in the words of MOSI President and CEO John Graydon Smith, MOSI changed its name to the Museum of Science & Innovation on January 27, 2026.

== Accreditation ==
MOSI was re-accredited in April 2008 by the American Alliance of Museums (AAM). MOSI was the 2009 recipient of the National Medal for Museums for the Institute of Museums and Library Services, which is the highest national award given to museums.

== Educational Programs and Camps ==
MOSI offers S.T.E.A.M. (Science, Technology, Engineering, Art, and Math) programs for preschool through high school students. MOSI's camps are open when school is out of session, including summer educational camps. These camps cover various scientific topics such as snorkeling in a natural spring, using DNA to solve crimes, and video game design. Attendees will receive a S.T.E.A.M. Certificate of Achievement after completing the courses.

== Community engagement ==
=== Hispanic Scientist of the Year Award ===
Catering to the large, diverse community of Tampa Bay (and Florida at large), MOSI recognizes Hispanic Scientists through an annual award. The scientists attend Meet the Scientists Days, and they speak to children about their paths to the STEM fields. The Hispanic Scientist of the Year Award has been awarded since 2001.

=== Conservation ===
MOSI encouraged environmental conservation through exhibits, from water conservation to Florida-friendly gardens that were closed during the museum downsizing.

== Current exhibits ==
=== Mission: Moonbase ===
Mission: Moonbase is a simulated permanent lunar base in the year 2070. The premise is that it is built near the south pole of the Moon where there is believed to be large reservoirs of frozen water reasonably available within the rocks, and where some highlands can experience long periods of sunlight. Moonbase is the operations center of a larger operation that also includes food production (farming) and mining facilities. Mission: Moonbase at MOSI is funded, in part, by NASA and is part of MOSI's plan to continually improve our guest experience and support the future of STEAM.

=== Slippery Science ===
Slippery Science, contains multiple exhibits that incorporate elements of the Tampa Bay Times Forum and Tampa Bay Lightning hockey team as a backdrop. Slippery Science includes a series of interactive exhibits that teach friction, physics, the science behind reaction time and more.

=== Wooden Wonders of the World ===
Wooden Wonders of the World is a temporary art installation exhibit featuring model sculptures of famous buildings hand made out of toothpicks. It will no longer be available after May 29, 2023.

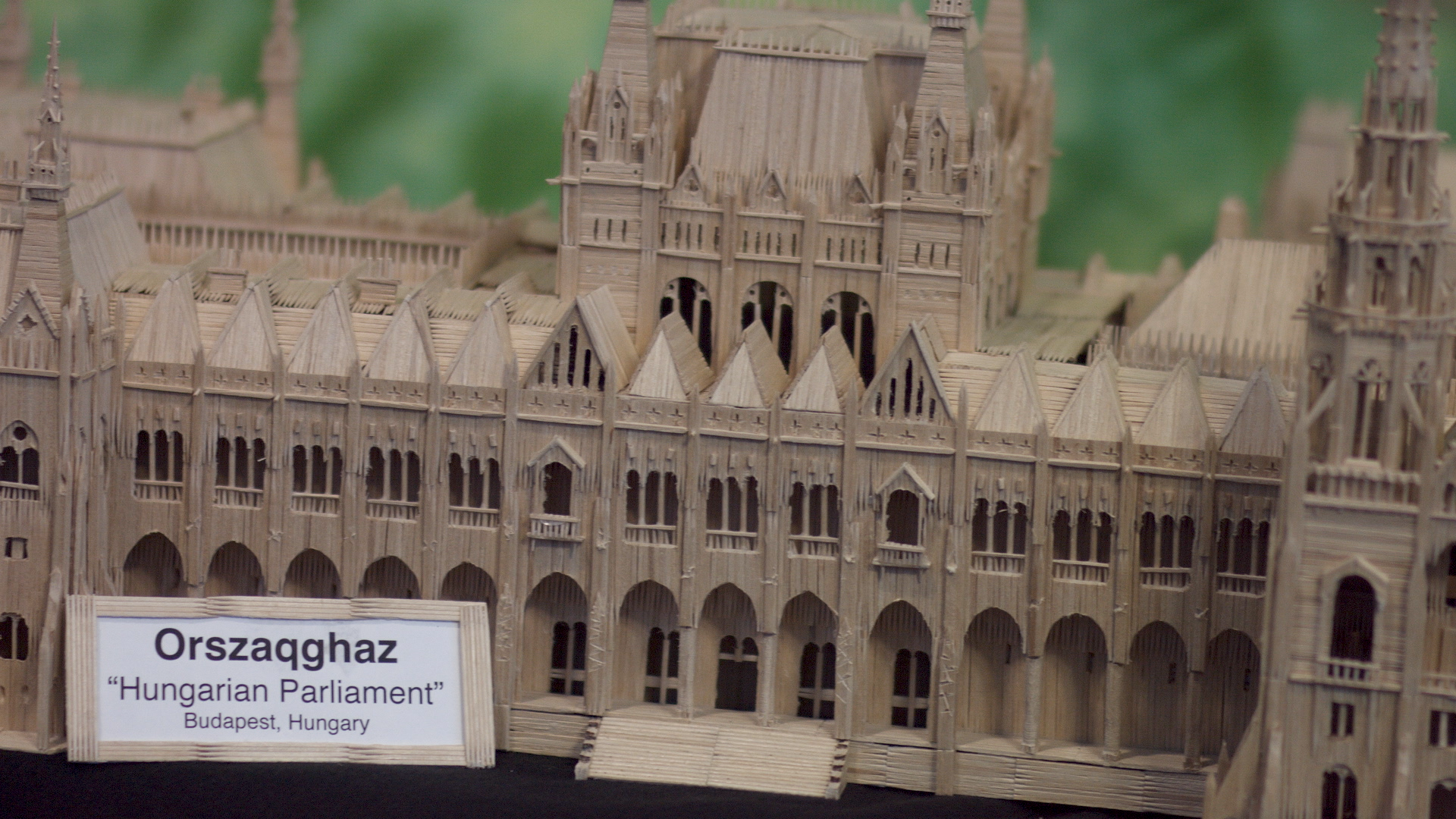
Toothpick sculpture made by Stan Munro on display in MOSI

=== Dinovations Lab ===
Dinovations Lab is a Jurassic-themed exhibit about paleontology. It includes PaleoLab investigations, crawl-through challenges, dino-themed animation in Fossil Films, and an opportunity to touch actual dino poop.

=== Saunders Planetarium ===
The Saunders Planetarium was established in 1992 and is currently the only planetarium in Tampa. Thanks to a gift by the Saunders Foundation and construction by the R.R. Simmons Construction Corporation, the Planetarium opened its doors on October 3, 1992. In July 2009, the planetarium moved to a new location in Kids In Charge! Since then, nearly 700,000 people have seen its shows.

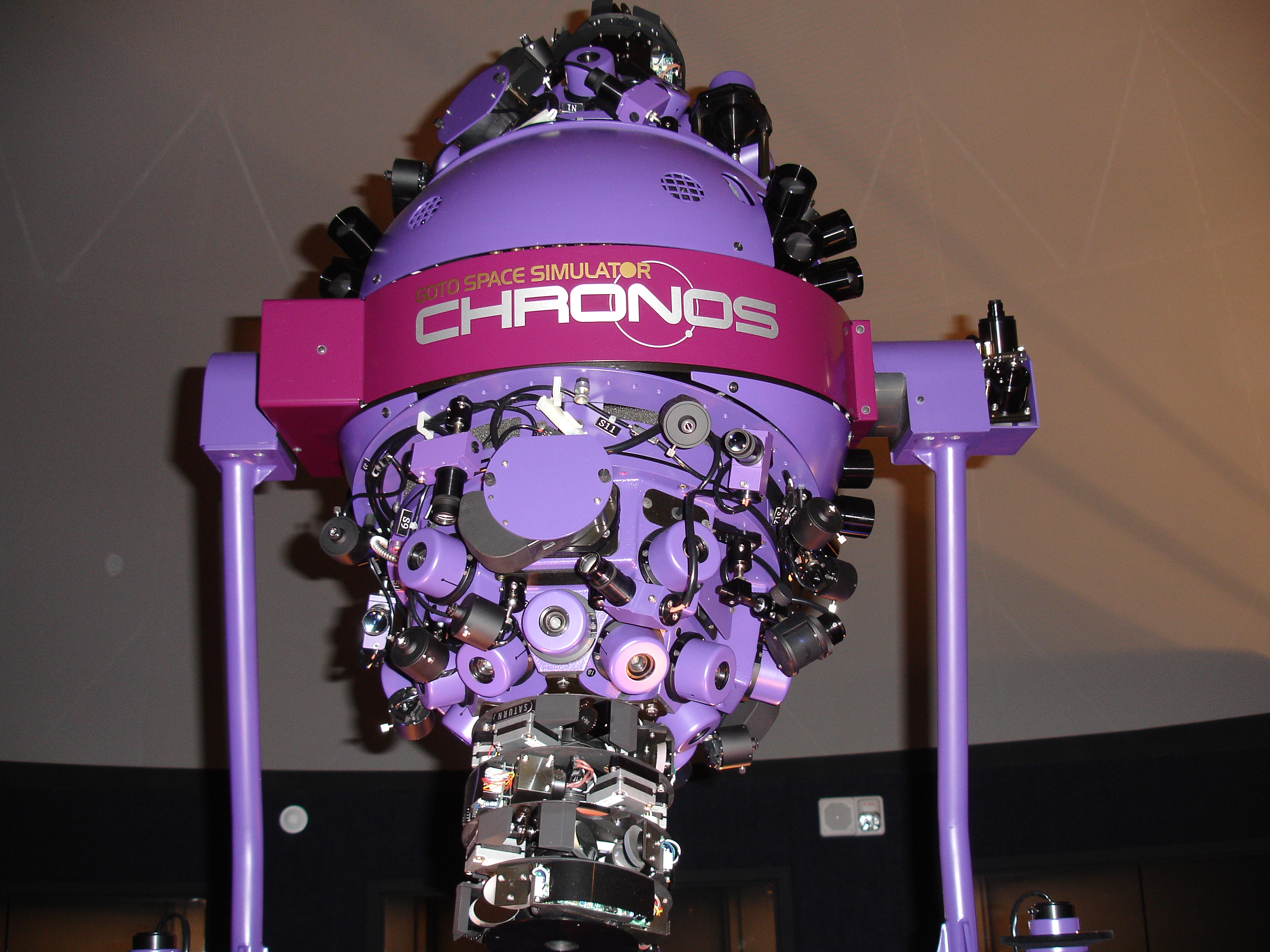
The planetarium's current projector

== Former exhibits ==
=== Gulf Coast Hurricane ===
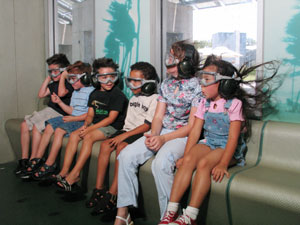
Inside the wind generator

The hurricane exhibit at MOSI allows people to experience winds that range from a harmless rain storm to a category one hurricane. This exhibit is designed to raise awareness of the intensity of a storm. The museum refers to it as a "Get Smart, Get Ready" opportunity to enlighten people on how to do just that, learn and prepare for a storm. As the wind increases, a wall chart indicates the Beaufort Wind Scale and what could be expected of the winds that are being experienced. Each wind increment is tagged with an event (i.e. you cannot hold an umbrella at a wind speed of twenty-five miles per hour).

The wind is generated above the room then brought down through vents and fans using recycled air. The maximum sustained winds top at a category one hurricane, or 74 miles per hour (119 km/h).

=== Bio-Works Butterfly Garden ===
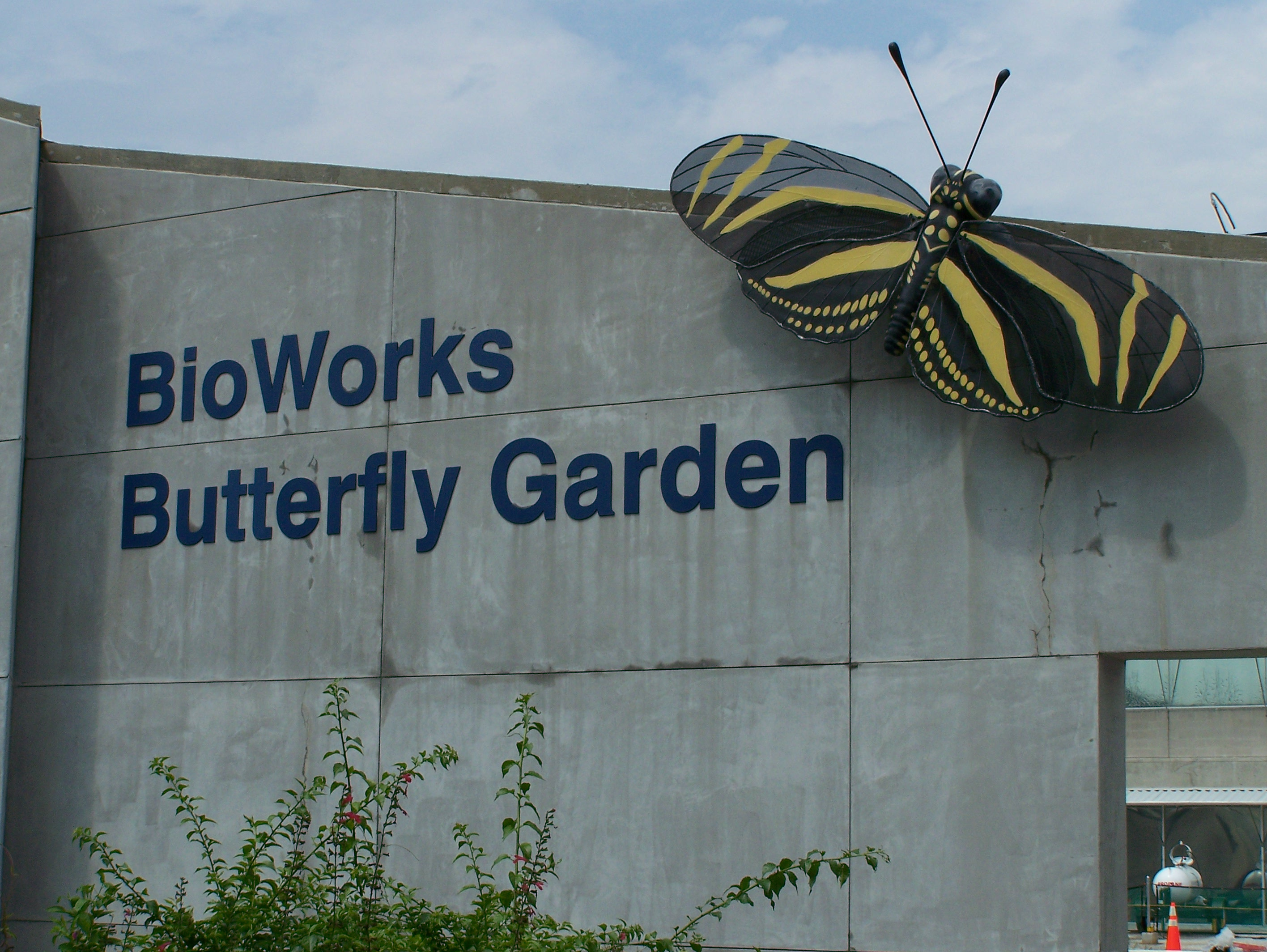
The outside of the exhibit

The Bio-Works Butterfly Garden and Alternate Waste Treatment exhibit was added to the Museum of Science and Industry in 1996. The exhibit consists of a butterfly garden and a self-sustaining fish pond. The garden is home to over 30 species of butterflies and several aquatic species, most of which are native to Florida. Several thousand native Florida butterflies are raised each year in a publicly viewable laboratory. These butterflies include the zebra longwing - Florida state butterfly, and the giant swallowtail and the tiger swallowtail - two of the largest North American butterflies.

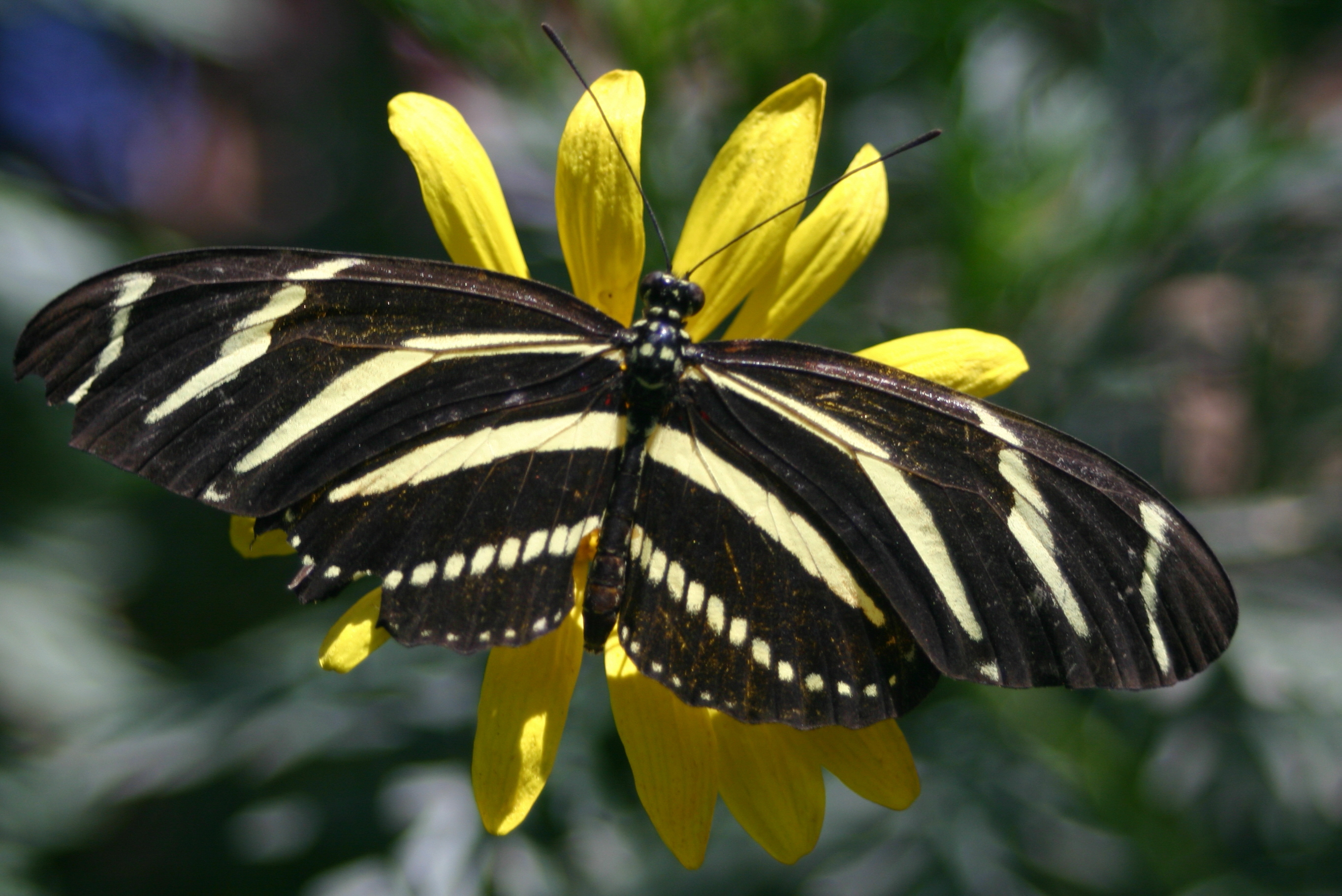
The zebra longwing butterfly

The pond and large white tanks in front of the garden are part of a model wastewater treatment facility designed to purify wastewater in a simulated wetland environment. Waste water is fed through pumps into a series of underground anaerobic and aerobic purification tanks where waste particles are broken down by bacteria. The water is then pumped into a series of above ground aerobic tanks and then into a settling tank, called the clarifier, which settles remaining solids out of the water for further processing. The clean water is then chlorinated to remove remaining bacteria and then dechlorinated to remove chemicals that will be harmful to plant and animal life. Finally, the clean water is pumped back into a fish pond and the cycle continues. Of the fish in the pond, the tilapia are the most unusual. The tilapia are the third, fourth and fifth generations of descendants of the first fish born in space. This fish, named Amigo, was born on John Glenn's last space mission, STS-95, and was returned to earth so that its reproduction could be observed.

=== The Amazing You! ===
MetLife Foundation's Amazing You! is a 13,000-square-foot (1,200 m^{2}) exhibition about health and wellness at each developmental life stage. The exhibit informs about developmental milestones, what it takes to stay healthy at each stage, and how to return to wellness after an illness, surgery or a disability. It features medical conditions and diseases according to prevalence during each developmental stage of life.

The first phase of this permanent exhibition is located in MOSI's third floor exhibit gallery. The first phase focuses on the beginning of life to adolescence life stages. The second phase is located next to the first phase. The second phase focuses on the young adult to end of life stages.

=== WeatherQuest Sponsored by Bay News 9 ===
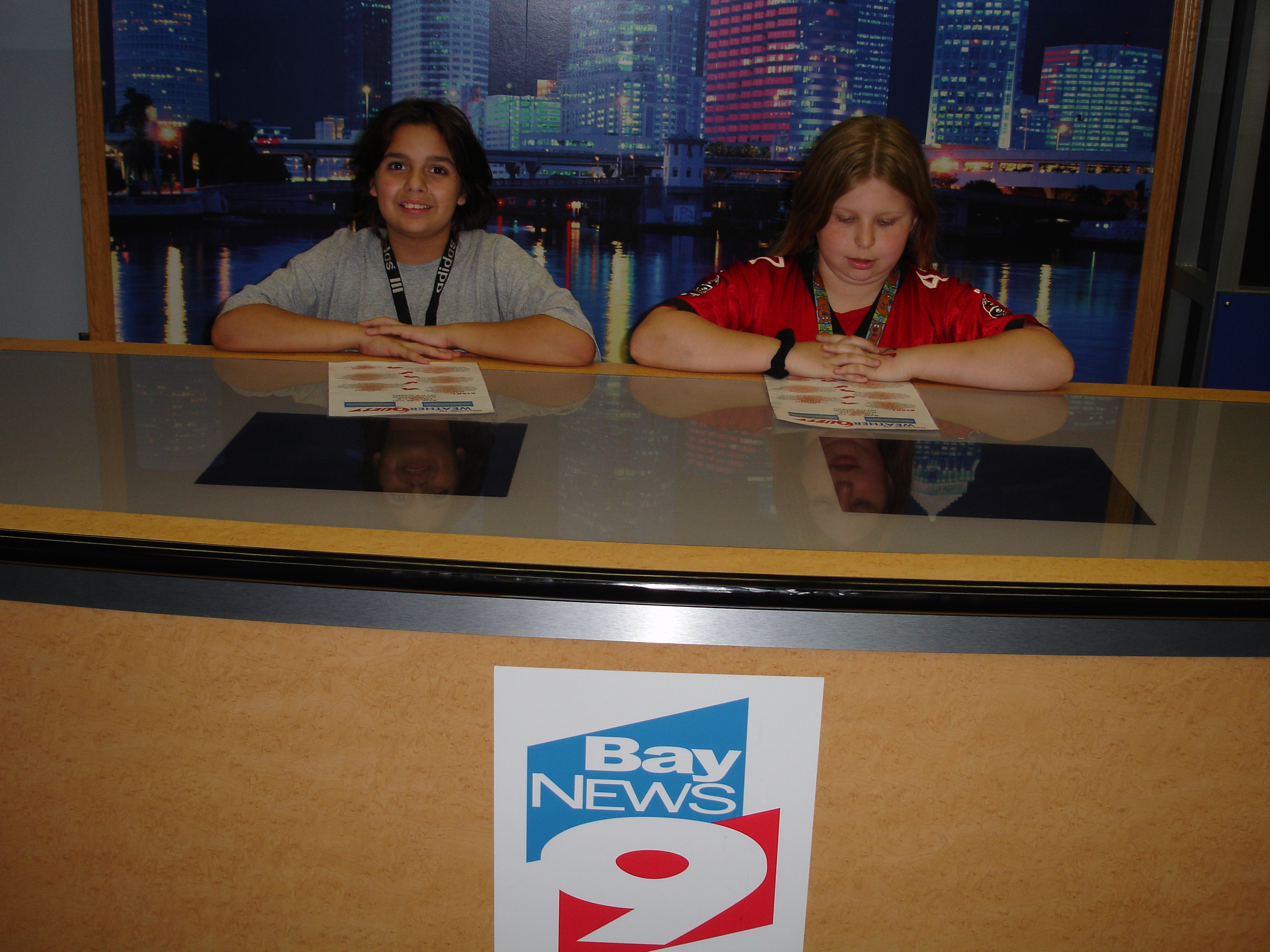
Children participate in a mock Bay News 9 news cast

Bay News 9 Project Weather Weather Quest is an exhibit within Disasterville at the Museum of Science and Industry. The permanent exhibit features a Bay News 9 news desk and meteorologist green screen. This exhibit features 10,000 sq ft (930 m^{2}). of interactive exhibits on the science of natural disasters, how it affects lives and property, and what can be done to minimize property damage and loss of life. The exhibition covers nine disaster genres: floods, hail storms, hurricanes, lightning, tornadoes, wildfires, volcanoes, earthquakes, and tsunamis.
