= Retracted article on dopaminergic neurotoxicity of MDMA =

Retracted article published in Science

"Severe dopaminergic neurotoxicity in primates after a common recreational dose regimen of MDMA (Note: 3,4-methylenedioxy-N-methylamphetamine (MDMA) is the chemical name for the psychotropic drug commonly known as "ecstasy".) ("ecstasy")", is an article by George A. Ricaurte that was published in September 2002 in the peer-reviewed journal Science, one of the world's top academic journals. It was later retracted; instead of using MDMA, methamphetamine had been used in the test.

== Original publication ==
An editorial article on the paper indicated that researchers had observed dopaminergic neurotoxicity (death of neurons involved in dopamine pathways) in monkeys following MDMA injections, a finding which suggested that recreational users of MDMA may be at risk of developing neuropsychiatric disorders associated with dopamine dysfunction.

Following the release of the paper, Science published a “News of the week” article by Constance Holden. The article noted that the results of the study had caused the researchers concern that even a single night of MDMA usage could cause brain damage, and leave a person vulnerable to neurological disorders such as Parkinson's disease. Holden also noted that the findings of the study were surprising, due to MDMA being known for prompting the release of large amounts of serotonin, but not dopamine. In the article, cognitive neuroscientist Jon Cole was described as being “skeptical” about the risk of Parkinson's from MDMA use, stating that there had only been one case report of Parkinson's related to the use of ecstasy. In response, the researchers stated that this could be due to symptoms not presenting until "70% to 80%" of dopamine had been depleted.

Alan Leshner, a former director of the National Institute on Drug Abuse, also commented on the study, stating "This says even a single evening's use is playing Russian roulette with your own brain."

== Retraction ==
In June 2003, a letter to Science was published in which the results of the study were questioned. Ricaurte stood by the findings.

In September 2003, the paper was retracted. In a statement published in Science, the research team indicated that due to a labelling error, methamphetamine had been administered to 9 of the 10 test animals instead of MDMA. The team had consistently been unable to replicate the original results, which lead to them conducting an investigation and ultimately discovering the error.

Following the retraction, Ricaurte stated that he would continue to investigate the possibility of a relationship between MDMA and dopamine dysfunction, and that the laboratory would be adjusting its chemical handling procedure.

== Reactions ==
In a review of the year's events published in the December issue of Science, Editor-in-Chief Donald Kennedy wrote, "It was also a vintage year for scientific fluffs. We shared in one: Some vials containing the recreational drug Ecstasy got switched with vials containing methamphetamine, and we wound up publishing a paper we wish we hadn't".

Journalists such as Larry Smith and Carla Spartos have stated that the inaccurate study may have influenced drug policy being made at the time, such as the RAVE act of April 2003.

In an interview in The Scientist, British scientists Colin Blakemore and Leslie Iversen described how they expressed concerns about the article with editors at Science. "It's an outrageous scandal," Iversen told The Scientist. "It's another example of a certain breed of scientist who appear to do research on illegal drugs mainly to show what the governments want them to show. They extract large amounts of grant money from the government to do this sort of biased work."

A study of the 50 largest American newspapers with available online archives found that 26 (52%) covered the original article's publication, while 20 (40%) covered its retraction. Of the newspapers that covered the article's publication, only 14 (54%) covered its retraction, suggesting large numbers of newspaper readers who had been exposed to the misinformation were never made aware that the study had been in error.

== See also ==
- Urban legends about illegal drugs
- Lancet MMR autism fraud
