= List of anti-cannabis organizations =

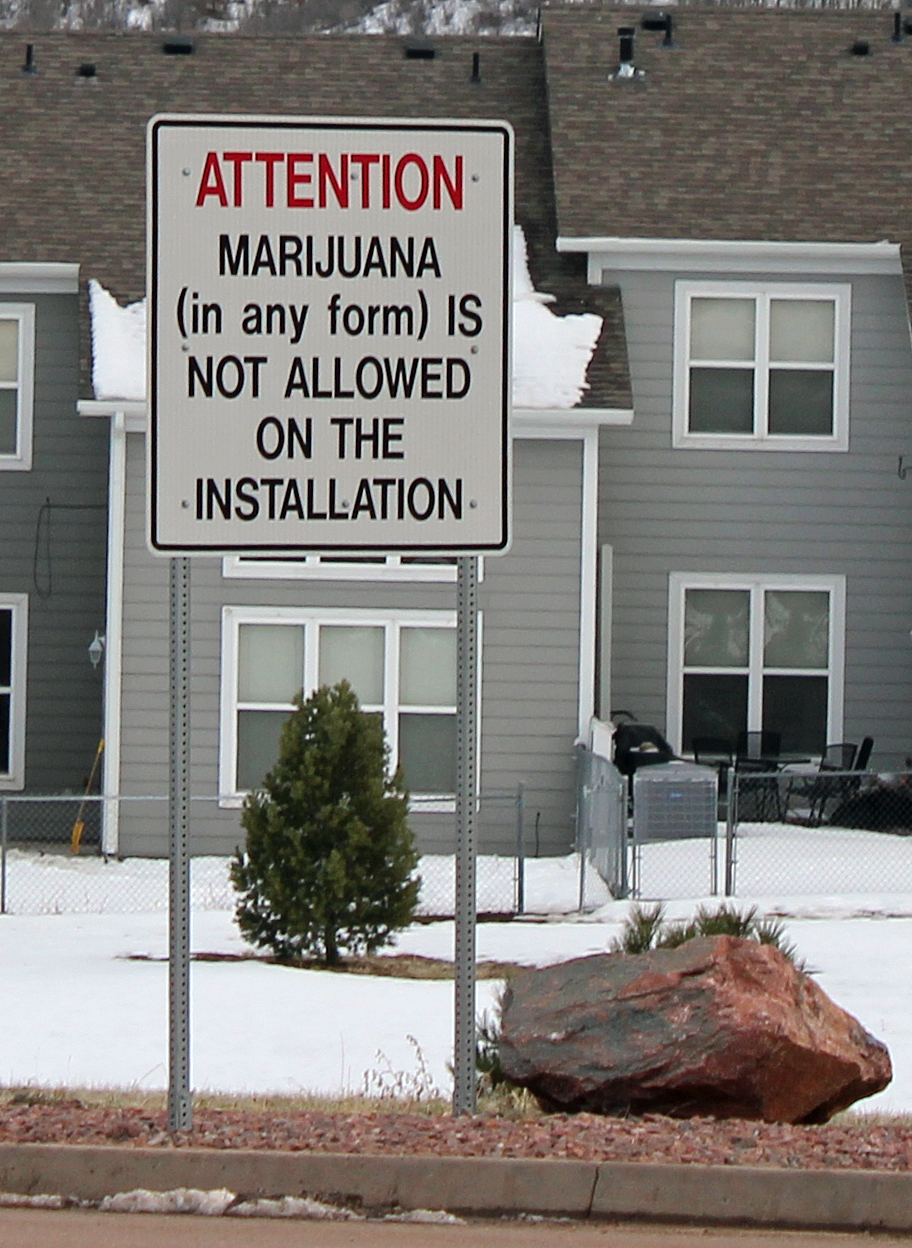
A sign outside Fort Carson, Colorado

The following is a list of anti-cannabis organizations and campaigns:

== Anti-cannabis organizations ==
=== Private-sector organizations ===
- Abbott Laboratories
- American Anti Drug Council
- American Legislative Exchange Council
- Archdiocese of Boston
- CoreCivic
- Drug Abuse Resistance Education
- Drug Free America Foundation
- Families Anonymous
- Foundation for a Drug-Free World
- The Heritage Foundation
- Insys Therapeutics (defunct as of 2019)
- Independent Order of Rechabites
- Movendi International
- Narconon
- National Association of Police Organizations
- National Cannabis Prevention and Information Centre
- National Families in Action
- National Family Partnership
- Norwegian Narcotic Officers Association
- Pacific Justice Institute
- Partnership to End Addiction
- Pharmaceutical Research and Manufacturers of America
- Purdue Pharma
- Smart Approaches to Marijuana
- Straight, Incorporated
- Two Is Enough D.C.
- University of the Philippines Manila
- Wackenhut Corrections
- White Ribbon Association
- Woman's Christian Temperance Union
- Youth Challenge International

=== Political parties ===
- American Constitution Party (Colorado)
- American Freedom Party
- Communist Party of the Philippines
- Moderate Party
- National Alliance (United States)
- Prohibition Party

=== Governmental organizations ===
- Anti-Narcotics Force
- Campaign Against Marijuana Planting
- Center for Substance Abuse Prevention
- Commission on Narcotic Drugs
- Domestic Cannabis Eradication/Suppression Program
- Drug Enforcement Administration
- Federal Drug Control Service of Russia
- Florida's Domestic Marijuana Eradication Program
- High Intensity Drug Trafficking Area
- International Narcotics Control Board
- Israel Anti-Drug Authority
- Kentucky Marijuana Strike Force
- Main Directorate for Drugs Control
- National Institute on Drug Abuse
- National Marijuana Initiative
- Office of National Drug Control Policy
- Oficina Nacional Antidrogas
- Oklahoma Bureau of Narcotics and Dangerous Drugs Control
- Opioid and Drug Abuse Commission
- Organized Crime Drug Enforcement Task Force
- Philippine Drug Enforcement Agency
- Royal Commission into Drug Trafficking
- Smart Approaches to Marijuana (SAM)
- Tennessee Bureau of Investigation
- Tennessee Governor's Task Force on Marijuana Eradication
- United Nations Drug Control Programme
- Wyoming Association of Sheriffs and Chiefs of Police (WASCOP)
- WYCAN

== Anti-cannabis campaigns ==
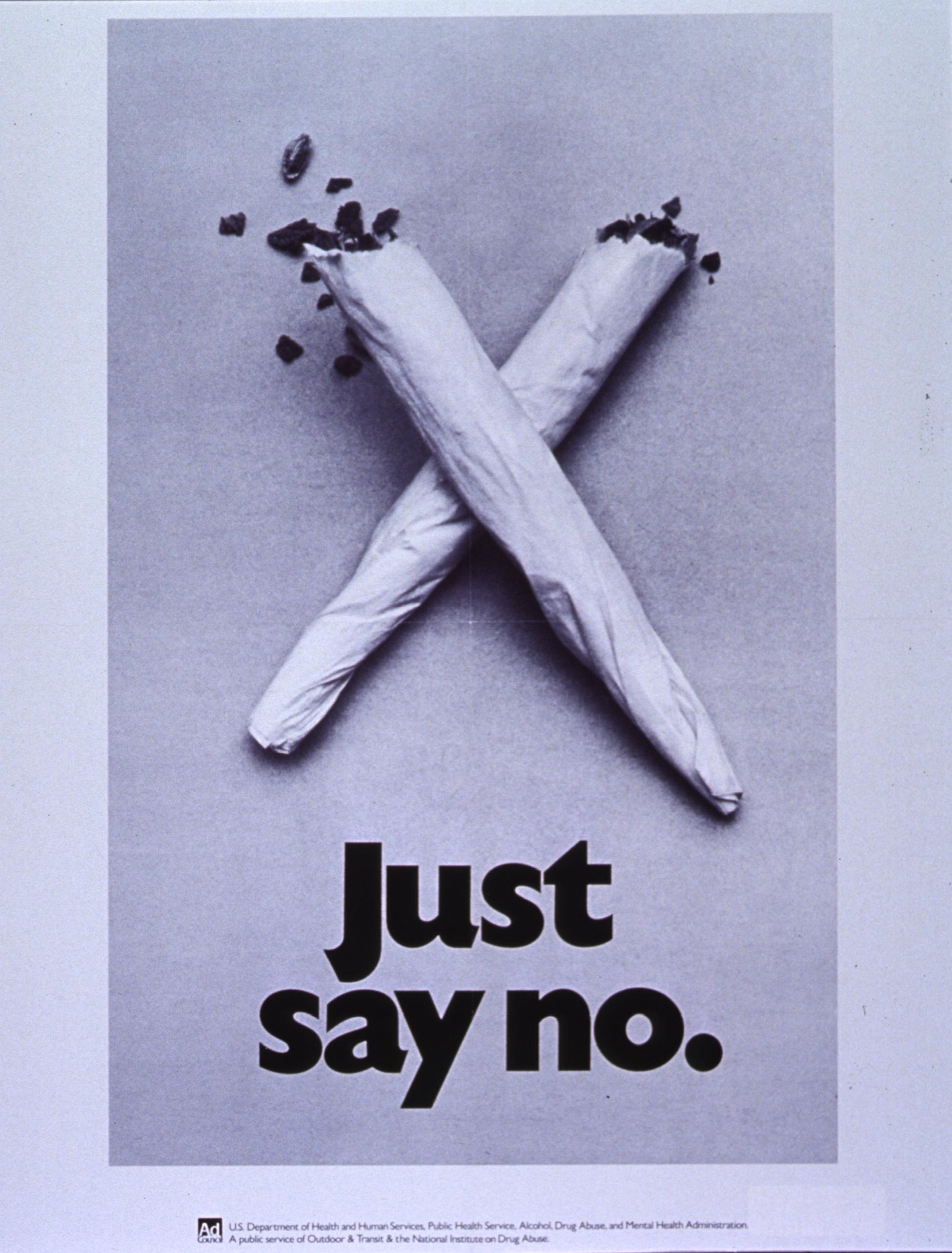
1980s Advertising Council poster for National Institute on Drug Abuse

=== Public campaigns ===
- Anti-420 public service announcement campaigns
- International Day Against Drug Abuse and Illicit Trafficking
- Mandatory sentencing
- Operation Green Merchant
- Operation Green Sweep
- Operation Intercept
- Operation Jackpot
- Operation Keymer
- Operation Kruz Control
- Operation Pipe Dreams
- Red Ribbon Week
- Three-strikes law
- War on drugs
- Washington State anti-cannabis public service announcements
- Zero tolerance

=== Mass media ===
- Above the Influence
- Assassin of Youth
- Just Say No
- Marihuana (1936 film)
- National Youth Anti-Drug Media Campaign
- Reefer Madness
- She Shoulda Said No!
- Stoner Sloth
- The Marihuana Story
- This Is Your Brain on Drugs
- Winners Don't Use Drugs

== Museums ==
- Drug Enforcement Administration Museum and Visitors Center

== See also ==
- List of addiction and substance abuse organizations
- List of anti-cannabis activists
- List of cannabis seizures
- List of Schedule I controlled substances (U.S.)
- Misuse of Drugs Act 1971
