= AADC =

AADC may refer to:

- African-African Descendants Caucus; see Global Afrikan Congress
- Age Appropriate Design Code, a code of practice for online services
- American Anti Drug Council
- Army Air Defence College, academy of the Indian Army
- Army Air Defence Command (Pakistan)
- Aromatic L-amino acid decarboxylase, an enzyme
- Australian Antarctic Data Centre
- Ada Apa dengan Cinta?, a 2002 Indonesian film
- Ada Apa Dengan Cinta? 2, a 2016 Indonesian film
- Azure AD Connect (AADC component), Microsoft Azure
