= Cannabis policy of the George H. W. Bush administration =

During the administration of American President George H. W. Bush (1989–1993), the United States largely followed the precedents set by the cannabis policy of the Reagan administration, including prosecution of the war on drugs.

== Appointment of William Bennett ==
In 1989, Bush appointed William Bennett director of the Office of National Drug Control Policy. Bennet once stated: "why in God's name foster the use of a drug that makes you stupid?"

== Operation Green Merchant ==
In 1989, the Bush administration began Operation Green Merchant, a nationwide investigation and operation targeting businesses advertising specialized horticultural equipment that was supposedly used to grow cannabis. The program also traced lists of customers who had bought such materials, and raided their homes.

== Smoke a Joint, Lose Your License ==
In 1990, the Bush administration began a program which called for states to further punish drug offenses, including cannabis use, with a six month driver's license suspension, and threatened to withhold federal highway funds from states that did not comply by 1995. Since the law did not require that the drug offense be at all related to driving, it was nicknamed "Smoke a joint, lose your license".

== Compassionate Investigational New Drug program ==
In 1978, the Carter Administration founded the Compassionate Investigational New Drug program to provide federally-produced cannabis grown by the University of Mississippi to a limited number of patients. In the 1980s, the list of approved recipients was expanded to include persons suffering from AIDS. The Bush administration closed the program to new applicants in 1992, possibly as a response to an increasing number of applicants suffering from AIDS who used cannabis to improve their appetites to counter wasting, and also in response to findings that cannabis was not medically effective. The director of Compassion IND, James O. Mason stated: "If it is perceived that the Public Health Service is going around giving marijuana to folks, there would be a perception that this stuff can't be so bad."
