= Barbary Coast cannabis lounge =

Establishment in San Francisco

Coordinates: 37.7820°N 122.4078°W

The Barbary Coast Collective lounge on Mission Street in San Francisco, California is the first Amsterdam-style coffee shop allowing on-premises cannabis consumption for any adult in California since January 2018. It is perhaps the first in the United States. Its interior "resembles a steakhouse or upscale sports tavern with its red leather seats, deep booths with high dividers, and hardwood floors". Its owners include David Ho, described as a "political power player in Chinatown". In opening another Barbary Coast Collective establishment, the first dispensary in the Sunset District, Ho had to negotiate with fellow Chinese-American citizens of the district who were opposed to cannabis businesses and cannabis advertising.

The lounge features quartz glass appliances for dabbing cannabis concentrates and a "combustibles" smoking area for other products.

High Times listed Barbary Coast as one of San Francisco's top 10 dispensaries and said its "old-school" ambiance was "what happens when cigar bars are actually cool". It employed about 20 people in 2017. Los Angeles Times called it "probably the best known" lounge in San Francisco, the city which "set the standard" in the United States.

== See also ==
- Barbary Coast, San Francisco, the former red-light district
