= List of cannabis seizures =

This is a list of cannabis seizures notable for record-setting size or social precedent.

Operation	Agency	Location	Year	Amount and form^{*}	Notes
	U.S.–Colombia joint operation	Guajira Peninsula, Colombia	1978	570+ tons	Largest drug seizure to date by a factor of 10, worth $200 million.
Night Train Seizure	US Coast Guard	Atlantic Ocean near Florida	1978	54 tons (108,000 lb)	
	US Coast Guard	Pacific Ocean 150 miles from San Diego	1984	26,000 pounds	Yacht Arrakis; largest on West Coast to date.
Project Pacifico	U.S. Drug Enforcement Administration (DEA) and Mexican authorities	Chihuahua, Northern Mexico	1984	10,000 tons (20,000,000 pounds)	Series of raids in Mexico, some unharvested plants, some harvested and baled. Seizure included 45 trucks able to carry 30 tons of bales each.
	US Coast Guard Cutter Roger B Taney (WHEC-37)	Atlantic Ocean	1985	160 Tons	Tug and Barge
Cornbread Mafia seizure	Organized Crime Drug Enforcement Task Force (investigator)	10 Midwest states, based in Kentucky	1989	182 tons (364,000 pounds) valued at $350 million	Over 70 individuals indicted operating 29 farms, called by federal prosecutors the "largest domestic marijuana producing organization in the nation."
Operation Green Sweep	US Army/National Guard/Bureau of Land Management	King Range National Conservation Area, Emerald Triangle, California	1990	1400 plants	First time active-duty troops engaged in counterdrug activities inside US borders.
Operation Conquistador	DEA	Caribbean (multiple)	2000	362 tonnes	DEA coordinated 26 country effort; largest in this table by weight.
Operation Keymer	Local police	Cambridge UK	2006	54 kg (119 lb)	
Operation Imperial Emperor	DEA	California–Mexico	2007	27,229 pounds	Other drugs and $45 million cash seized.
	Federal/local	Houston	2007	19,000 pounds	Seized drugs were being transported in school buses.
Norwegian cannabis raids	National Criminal Investigation Service	Norway	2007–2008	500 cannabis plants on a single farm, over 40 individual raids	One of Norway's largest narcotics cases.
	Counter Narcotics Police of Afghanistan	Kahdahar, Afghanistan	2008	260 tons hashish 520,000 lb^{†}	Said to be largest drug seizure in history at the time, worth $400 million.
	US interagency?	Queens	2009	50,000 pounds	BC bud, street value $150 million.
Operation Save our Sierra	State/Federal	Fresno, California	2009	330,000 plants	Estimated value $1 billion, second largest in this table.
	RCMP	Montreal	2010	8 tons (16,000 pounds) hashish	Found in abandoned trailer.
Operation Deliverance	DEA	Mexico–US	2010	69 tons	Bilateral
Cowabungle raid?	Federal police	Tijuana	2010	105 tons	Largest seizure in Mexico in years.
	Mexican Army	Baja California desert, Mexico	2011	120 tons of marijuana, worth 1.8 billion pesos ($160 million)	Largest plantation ever seized in Mexico; over 300-acre (120 ha) open-air farm one mile from federal highway, possibly run by Sinaloa cartel
Operation Kruz Control	Federal interagency/local	Arizona	2012–2013	27,000 pounds	Year-long operation.
	CBP	Calexico border crossing	2013	35,000 pounds	Largest seizure at US-Mexico border.
Operation Everglades	CBP, DEA	Chokoloskee	1983–1984	500,000 lbs	Largest seizure at the time
	Local police	Goodrich, Texas	2014	100,000 plants	Largest seizure in Texas history at the time.
Operation Weed Eaters and Operation Thunderstorm	National Drug Law Enforcement Agency	Akure, Ondo State	January–June 2014	34,030 kilograms (75,020 lb)	Largest single seizure by agency in Ondo State to date, valued at 364 million naira.
Operation Weed Eaters and Operation Thunderstorm	National Drug Law Enforcement Agency	Ondo State and elsewhere in Nigeria	January–June 2014	45,875 kilograms (101,137 lb)	Largest single seizure by agency in Ondo State to date, valued at 364 million naira.
	U.S. Customs and Border Protection (CBP)	Otay Mesa port of entry, San Diego County, California	2015	27,000 pounds	Second-largest seizure at US–Mexico border.
	Federal/local	Lipscomb County, Texas	2015	109,000 plants	New state record.
	Hong Kong Police Force	Hong Kong	2017	180 kg (400 lb)	Largest seizure in HK in a decade.
	DuPage County Metropolitan Enforcement Group	DuPage County, Illinois (Chicago area)	2021	7,688 pounds of cannabis, 406 pounds of cannabis edibles, and 6,891 THC vaping cartridges	Largest seizure in DuPage County "in memory", estimated to be worth $22 million.
Operation Trojan Shield	U.S. Federal Bureau of Investigation; Australian Federal Police; New Zealand Police; Europol		2021	22 tons	Enabled by ANOM standalone encryption devices used by criminals but secretly supplied by FBI.
Antelope Valley eradication operation	Los Angeles County Sheriff other southern California sheriffs California Department of Fish and Wildlife; California National Guard; U.S. Drug Enforcement Administration		2021	375,000 cannabis plants and 33,480 pounds of harvested marijuana	Largest seizure ever in Los Angeles County, worth over one billion dollars.
	Oregon State Police	White City, Oregon	2021	500,000 pounds of harvested marijuana	More than 100 people were arrested along with the seizure marijuana worth approximately $500 million.
Operation Caribbe	Canadian Armed Forces	Caribbean	2006–2021 or later	Over 6.7 tonnes of seized cannabis, 105 tonnes of cocaine as of 2021	Included operations by attack submarines HMCS Corner Brook in 2008 and 2011, and HMCS Victoria in 2014.
	Federal-state-tribal interagency	Navajo Reservation near Shiprock, New Mexico	2020	260,000 plants	Over 1,000 greenhouses raided; probably a mix of hemp and THC-bearing cannabis, employed many non-US persons.
	Guardia Civil and Policía Foral	Spain	2022	415,000 cannabis plants	Worth an estimated $108 million, called largest cannabis farm in Europe with 166 acres (67 ha) under cultivation.
	Yamhill County Sheriff deputies and volunteers, aided by Oregon State Police, Port of Portland PDX Task Force, Newberg-Dundee Police Department, Polk County Sheriff's Office, and Tualatin Valley Fire & Rescue	Yamhill County, Oregon outside Newberg (Portland area)	2022	Over 38 tons of harvested marijuana	Largest seizure in county history; farm unlicensed by Oregon Liquor and Cannabis Commission processing for illegal out-of-state sale; firearms and $80,000 in foil-wrapped cash also seized; evidence of wire transfers to Mexican state of Michoacán. Cannabis valued at $76.5 million in Oregon or $269 million on US East Coast.
	Sri Lanka Customs	Bandaranaike International Airport	2026	242 pounds (110 kg)	Largest seizure of Kush in airport history. Carried in luggage belonging to 22 Buddhist monks who were arrested.
	Butte County, California sheriff, federal Bureau of Land Management and California Department of Cannabis Control	Chico, California warehouse	2026	118 tons	Illegally processed under regulations for non-intoxicating hemp; valued at $283 million by government. 62 persons up to age 83 arrested. Largest seizure in county history.

^{*}Assumed dried leaf or flower material unless otherwise specified.
^{†}May not be independently verified
