= Sinsemilla =

Highly potent cannabis

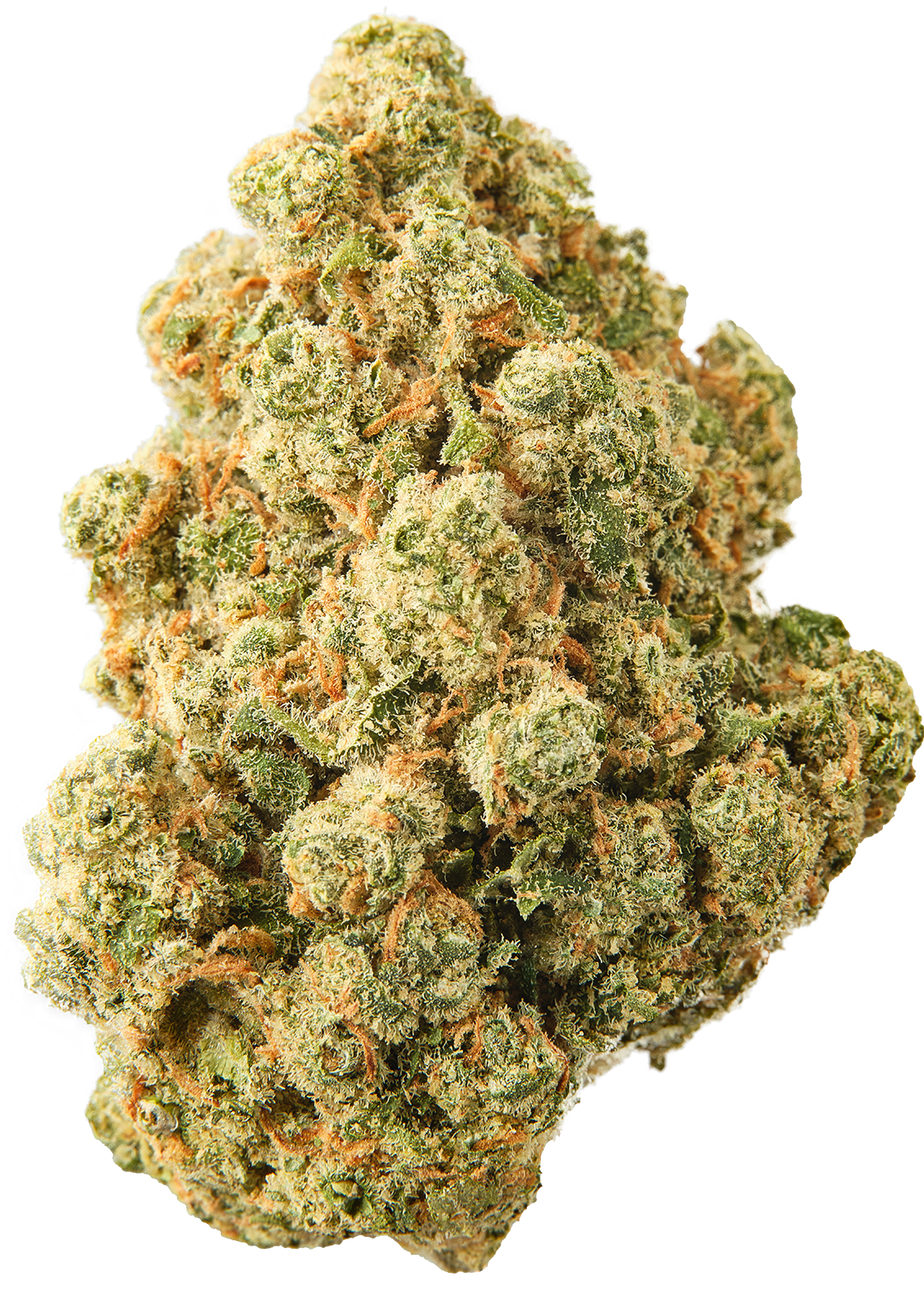
Seedless cannabis (sin semilla)

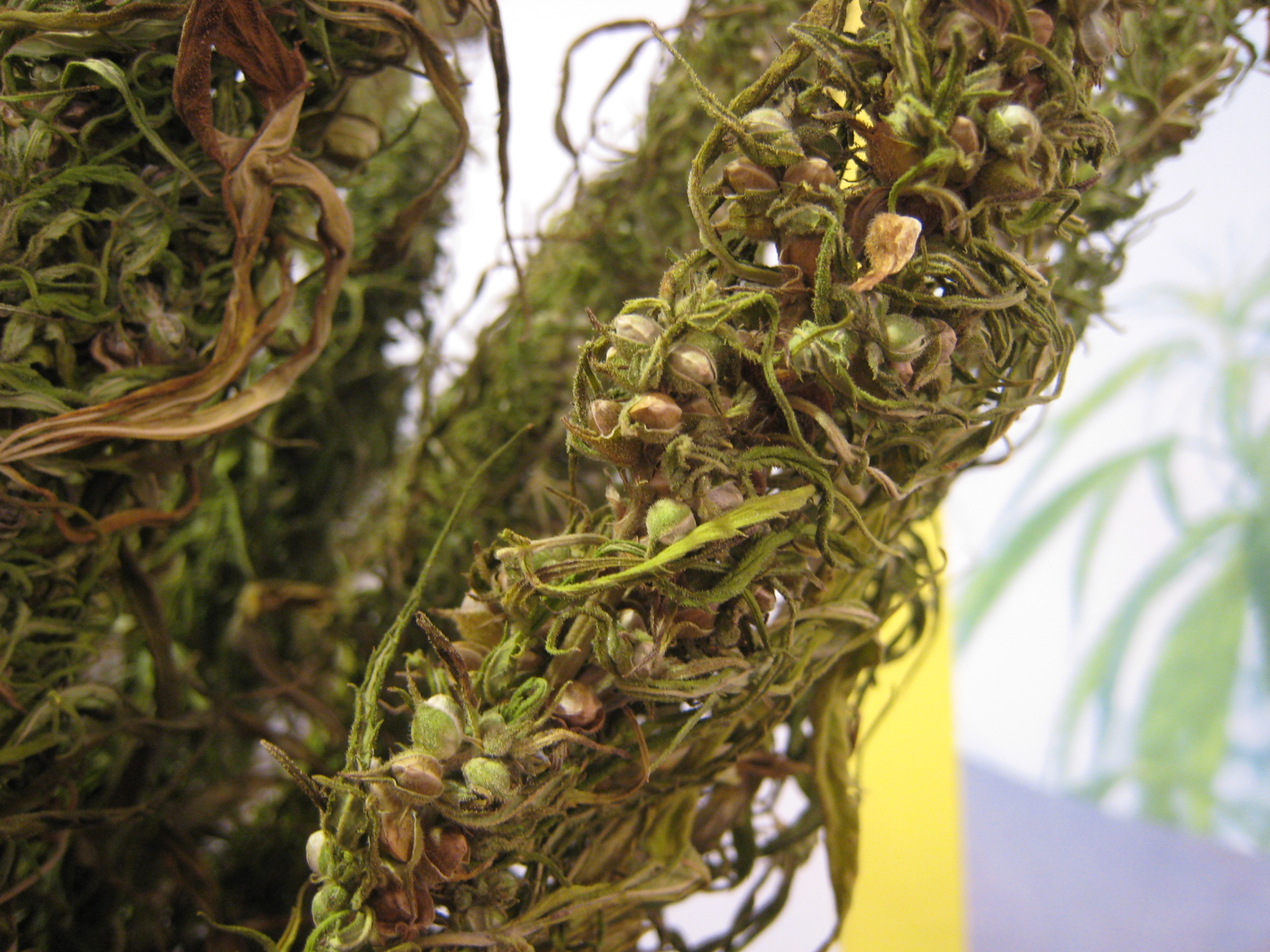
Seeded cannabis (con semilla)

Cannabis sinsemilla (Spanish pronunciation: [sinseˈmiʝa]) also known as sensimilla, sinse or sensi (can be translated into English as seedless cannabis) is the female Cannabis plant that has not been pollinated and therefore does not develop seeds, increasing the concentration of cannabinoids and terpenes. This cultivation technique was developed in Sinaloa, Mexico, in the 1970s, by the drug trafficker Rafael Caro Quintero and consists of separating male plants as soon as they are known to be male, in order to avoid pollination of female pistils. The seeds are not useful for recreational purposes and require the plant to make a great expenditure of energy that could be invested in increasing the tetrahydrocannabinol (THC) of the inflorescences (buds).

The technique became popular in the United States as sinsemilla, sinsemilia, sinse, or sense. In 1980, an American study indicated that the average THC of street marijuana was 1.8%, while sinsemilla reached 6%. Sinsemilla cannabis is a cultivation technique, so it should not be confused with skunk, which refers to strains with a high percentage of THC, of up to 34% THC content. The expression sinsemilla is practically obsolete since feminized seeds emerged in the 1990s. Feminized seeds are the outcome of a process entailing hormonally induced self-pollination of female cannabis plants, typically by silver ions.

== Health risks ==
Regular use of high potency cannabis (HPC) has been linked in several studies to an increased likelihood of psychotic disorders. A 2015 study looked at multiple users of skunk, sinse or other HPC cannabis strains in South London showed a corresponding relationship with adults presenting with episodes of psychosis similar to schizophrenia. Similar studies have been carried out in Germany, New Zealand and the Netherlands.

New research, carried out since the liberalisation of the harsh laws prohibiting cannabis, suggest that rather than being a cause of psychotic conditions the non-psychoactive cannabinoid compound, cannabidiol (CBD), may in fact have an anti-psychotic effect.

== In popular culture ==
- referenced in the movie Caddyshack (1980), a hybrid variety of golf turf, composed of Kentucky Blue Grass, Featherbed Bent, and Northern California sinsemilla.
- Sinsemilla (1980), album by the Jamaican reggae band Black Uhuru;
- Sinsemilla Tips (1980–1990), magazine founded by Tom Alexander in Corvallis, Oregon;
- Sinsemilia, a French reggae band formed in 1990;
- Sinsemilla (1996), compilation album by the Californian punk band Sublime;
- referenced numerous times in the lyrics of Sleep (band);
- referenced in the lyrics to The Offspring's "Original Prankster," off their 2000 album Conspiracy Of One
- Sinsemilla Dreams (2006), album by the experimental musician Danny Hyde;
- Sensimilla (2008), reggae track by Slightly Stoopid;
- Sensimilla (2020), single of the reggae band The Elovaters;
- Sensi Seeds, a major Dutch cannabis bank, one of the largest conglomerates in the cannabis market;
- Sensimilla (2026), a song by 100 gecs from the Grand Theft Auto VI soundtrack.
