= Talking dog (disambiguation) =

A talking dog is a type of talking animal, alleged or fictional.

Talking Dog or The Talking Dog may also refer to:

- Talking Dog, a Polish cultural event
- McDuff, the Talking Dog, an American television series
- Talking Dog, a character in The Powerpuff Girls
- Dog's View, also called Talking Dog, a 2007 anti-cannabis public service announcement
