= Red Ribbon Week =

Annual drug awareness campaign in the U.S.

Red Ribbon Week is an alcohol, tobacco, smoking, and other drug and violence prevention awareness campaign observed annually in October in the United States. It began as a tribute to fallen DEA special agent Enrique Camerena in 1985. According to the United States DEA, Red Ribbon Week is the nation's largest and longest-running drug awareness and prevention program.

== History ==
Red Ribbon Week began after the kidnapping, torture, harassment, and murder of DEA agent Enrique "Kiki" Camarena in 1985. Camarena had been working undercover for Guadalajara, Mexico for over four years. His efforts led to a tip that resulted in the discovery of a multimillion-dollar marijuana manufacturing operation in Chihuahua, Mexico. Corrupt politicians working for drug traffickers kidnapped Camarena and his pilot, Captain Alfredo Zavala-Avelar (taken separately on the same day).

Soon, representatives of the Mexican Federal Judicial Police (MFJP) presented a tip to DEA agents claiming that Camarena had been mistakenly kidnapped by a man and his three sons. The MFJP informed the agents that a raid of the man's ranch in Angostura would take place the following morning and invited them to come. However, the MFJP raided the ranch before DEA agents arrived. During the raid, they shot and killed five individuals. Not long after, a passerby discovered the bodies of both Camarena and Zavala-Avelar by the side of the road not far from the ranch.

The DEA's investigation revealed that Camarena had been tortured before he was murdered. Audiotapes of the torture showed that medical doctors actually kept Camarena alive in order to continue the interrogation. Evidence collected revealed that both Camarena and Zavala-Avelar were initially buried in another location, then moved to the ranch where they were found. The events that followed Camarena's disappearance were chronicled in U.S. media, exposing the world of drug trafficking including how far drug traffickers would go to maintain power and control.

=== National prominence ===
Henry Lozano with young guests from Calexico High School in California, where the Red Ribbon Campaign began in 1985.

After the men were found murdered, citizens in Camarena's hometown of Calexico, California donned red ribbons in his honor. The red ribbon became their symbol for prevention in order to reduce the demand of illegal drugs. California Congressman Duncan Hunter and teacher David Dhillon launched "Camarena Clubs" in California high schools. In 1986, club members presented a proclamation to Nancy Reagan, First Lady of the United States, who had initiated nationwide anti-drug programs. The following year, parent-teacher organizations in California, Illinois, and Virginia wore the red ribbons in late March and April. In 1988, the first National Red Ribbon Week was organized by the National Family Partnership (NFP), proclaimed by the U.S. Congress and chaired by Nancy Reagan.

Henry Lozano, Deputy Assistant to the President and Director of USA Freedom Corps in 2007–2008, helped to launch Red Ribbon Week in 1985. In 1985, Lozano, along with the Californian's for Drug-Free Youth Board of Directors, created the first Statewide Red Ribbon Campaign in memory of Camarena, his high school friend. With the support of Congressman Duncan Hunter and former Mayor of El Centro, CA & City Councilman David Dhillon, Lozano helped to promote "Camarena Clubs" in Imperial Valley, California, Camarena's home. From these clubs emerged the Red Ribbon Week campaign, and during the administration of President Ronald Reagan it grew into a nationwide service effort.

=== DEA Red Ribbon Week Patch Program ===
The DEA Red Ribbon Week Patch Program was an effort by the United States Drug Enforcement Administration designed to provide members of the Boy Scouts and Girl Scouts the opportunity to earn a special patch by promoting and engaging in related anti-drug activities celebrated during Red Ribbon Week. The program was a promotional effort only occurring in 2018 and promised a limited run of up to 15,000 patches to qualifying scouts. According to the DEA, their purpose in creating the program was to "empower young people to engage in a drug-free activity and strengthen their anti-drug beliefs."

== See also ==
- War on drugs
- Just Say No
