= List of anti-cannabis activists =

Individuals supporting cannabis prohibition

Anti-cannabis activists include individuals from many regions concerned with limitations on cannabis rights, or outright cannabis prohibition.

== People ==
- Bill Bennett
- Peter Bensinger
- Joseph Califano
- Alexandra Datig, organizer against 2010 California Proposition 19
- Robert DuPont
- Calvina Fay, executive director, Drug Free America Foundation
- David G. Evans, executive director, Drug Free Schools Coalition
- Pope Francis
- Stuart Gitlow
- Patrick J. Kennedy
- Seth Leibsohn
- Carla Lowe, co-founder, Californians for Drug-Free Youth and founder, Citizens Against Legalizing Marijuana
- Bertha Madras
- David W. Murray, Hudson Institute
- Luke Niforatos, executive vice president of Smart Approaches to Marijuana
- Dennis Prager
- Nancy Reagan, creator of U.S. "Just Say No" anti-drug campaign
- Kevin Sabet, former U.S. Office of National Drug Control Policy adviser, founder of Foundation for Drug Policy Solutions, and Smart Approaches to Marijuana executive
- Mel and Betty Sembler, founders, Straight, Inc.
- Christian Thurstone, psychiatrist
- Russell Vought
- John P. Walters, former Office of National Drug Control Policy director

== See also ==
- List of anti-cannabis organizations
