= YCI =

YCI or Yci may refer to:

- Youth Challenge International, an American Christian organization
- Youth Challenge International (Canada), Canadian youth-focused international development organization
- Young Communist International
- Yancey Collegiate Institute
- York Collegiate Institute, one of the precursors to the York College of Pennsylvania
- Zhang Yuxi, a Chinese actress also known as Yci
