= Cannabis in Kentucky =

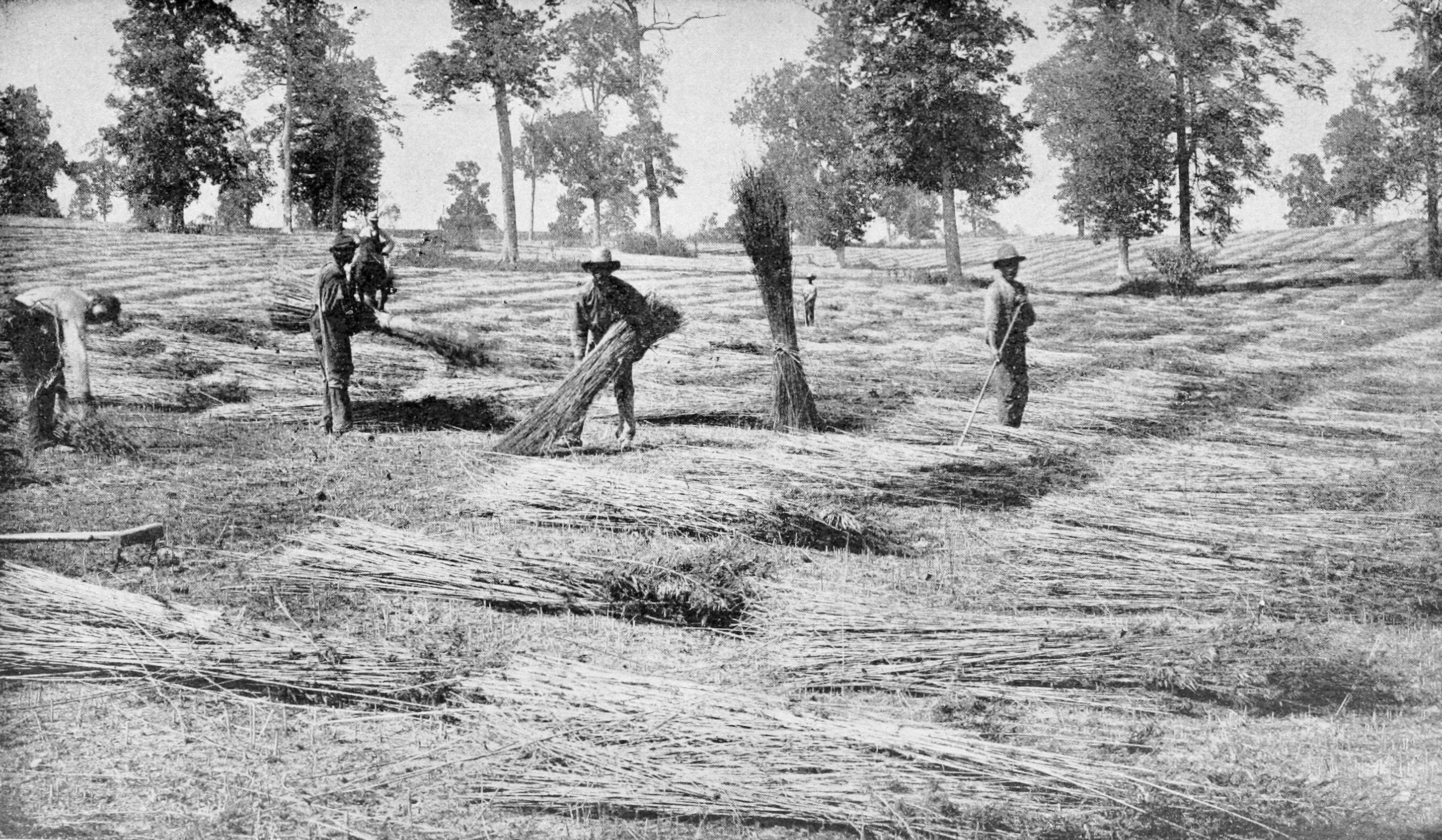
Hemp harvest in Kentucky, Popular Science, 1898

Cannabis in Kentucky is illegal for recreational use, and legal for medical use under executive order, with full medical legalization statute taking effect in 2025. Non-psychoactive CBD oil is also legal in the state, and Kentucky has a history of cultivating industrial hemp for fiber since 1775.

== Industrial hemp ==
Hemp was first cultivated for fiber in Kentucky near Danville in 1775, and cultivation there continued into the 20th century even though cultivation had diminished in other states.

A 1914 USDA report noted:

Practically all of the hemp grown in the United States is from seed produced in Kentucky. The first hemp grown in Kentucky was of European origin, the seed having been brought to the colonies, especially Virginia, and taken from there to Kentucky. In recent years there has been practically no importation of seed from Europe. Remnants of the European types are occasionally found in the shorter, more densely branching stalks terminating in thick clusters of small leaves. These plants yield more seed and mature earlier than the more desirable fiber types introduced from China[.] Nearly all of the hemp now grown in Kentucky is of Chinese origin. Small packets of seed are received from American missionaries in China. These seeds are carefully cultivated for two or three generations in order to secure a sufficient quantity for field cultivation, and also to acclimate the plants to Kentucky conditions. Attempts to produce fiber plants by sowing imported seed broadcast have not given satisfactory results. Seed of the second or third generation from China is generally regarded as most desirable. This Kentucky hemp of Chinese origin has long internodes, long, slender branches, opposite and nearly horizontal except the upper ones, large leaves usually drooping and not crowded, with the seeds in small clusters near the ends of the branches. Small, dark-colored seeds distinctly mottled are preferred by the Kentucky hemp growers. Under favorable conditions Kentucky hemp attains a height of 7 to 10 feet when grown broadcast for fiber and 9 to 14 feet when cultivated for seed.

== Appearance as a drug ==
It is unclear when cannabis first became popular as a drug in Kentucky, but The Encyclopedia of Louisville notes mention of the popularity of the drug in The Louisville Times in 1930:

Loco weed cigarettes, manufactured from a plant that has killed millions of animals are being sold to hunters who lack the price of morphine or opium shots. The cigarettes are known chiefly as 'muggles', 'bujees', or 'mariwanas'. Chief buyers are newspaper boys. The fags sell at thirty-five cents a piece or three for a dollar. There are sellers at Eighteenth and Jefferson, Third and Jefferson, and Second and Liberty Streets.

== 2014 legalization of CBD trials ==
In April 2014, Governor Steve Beshear signed a law permitting patients to use non-psychoactive cannabidiol (CBD) derivatives with a physician's recommendation, under clinical trials at the University of Kentucky in the treatment of epilepsy, but the law did not include provisions to legally produce or sell CBD.

== 2015 failed attempt to legalize medical cannabis ==
In 2015, House Bill 3 and Senate Bill 40 both proposed establishing a medical cannabis framework in Kentucky; both failed to pass out of committee. The anti-cannabis National Marijuana Initiative and the Kentucky Baptist Convention took credit for the defeat of the bills, and vowed to oppose medical cannabis bills in 2016. NMI coordinator Ed Shemelya stated: "The ultimate end game for proponents of – and I don't even like to call it medical marijuana – the proponents of marijuana as medicine is not to sanction marijuana as medicine but the outright legalization of recreational use of marijuana."

== 2020 attempt to legalize medical cannabis ==
On February 20, 2020, House Bill 136 passed 65 to 30. It was the first time a medical marijuana bill has been taken up by the full House. The bill proposes restrictions on who can have medical marijuana and where it can be used, and prohibits smoking medical marijuana. It stalled in the Senate due to the COVID-19 pandemic. The sponsor, Representative Jason Nemes of Louisville, stated that he would be re-submitting the Bill for the 2021 General Assembly.

== 2022 medical cannabis bill and executive action ==
Kentucky House Bill 136 was introduced on January 4, 2022. It passed the House Judiciary Committee 15–1 on March 10, and was passed by the House 59–34 on March 17. The governor of Kentucky, Andy Beshear, said on April 7 that he was considering executive action to permit medical cannabis in his state if the bill was not approved in the state senate. HB 136 did not receive a hearing in the Kentucky Senate by the end of the session on April 15, and days later, Beshear confirmed that executive actions would be forthcoming.

On June 14, Governor Beshear appointed a 17-member "Team Kentucky Medical Cannabis Committee" through executive order 2022-338 – noting "allowing Kentuckians diagnosed with certain medical conditions and receiving palliative care to cultivate, purchase, and/or use medical cannabis would improve the quality of their lives" and attendant economic benefits – with the purpose of holding public hearings. The committee had its first meeting on June 20. A public feedback website, medicalcannabis.ky.gov, was also created under the order.

On November 14, Beshear issued an executive order declaring cannabis legal to process for medical use but only if it is 8 ounces or less and was legally purchased in another state.

== 2023 medical cannabis bill ==
Kentucky Senate Bill 47 authorizing medical cannabis in Kentucky was passed by the state legislature on March 30, 2023, and signed into law by Governor Beshear on March 31. The provisions of the bill became effective January 1, 2025.

The bill establishes regulations for medical cannabis qualifying conditions. Under the bill, the Kentucky Center for Cannabis Research would be able to add new conditions to the list.

Patients may possess a 30-day supply. Smoking cannabis is prohibited, but raw cannabis will be available for vaporizing. The bill also established THC limits: 35% on flower, 70% on concentrates, and 10 milligrams on edibles.

== See also ==
- Hemp in Kentucky
- Kentucky Marijuana Strike Force
