= Cannabis advertising =

Advertising of cannabis products to consumers

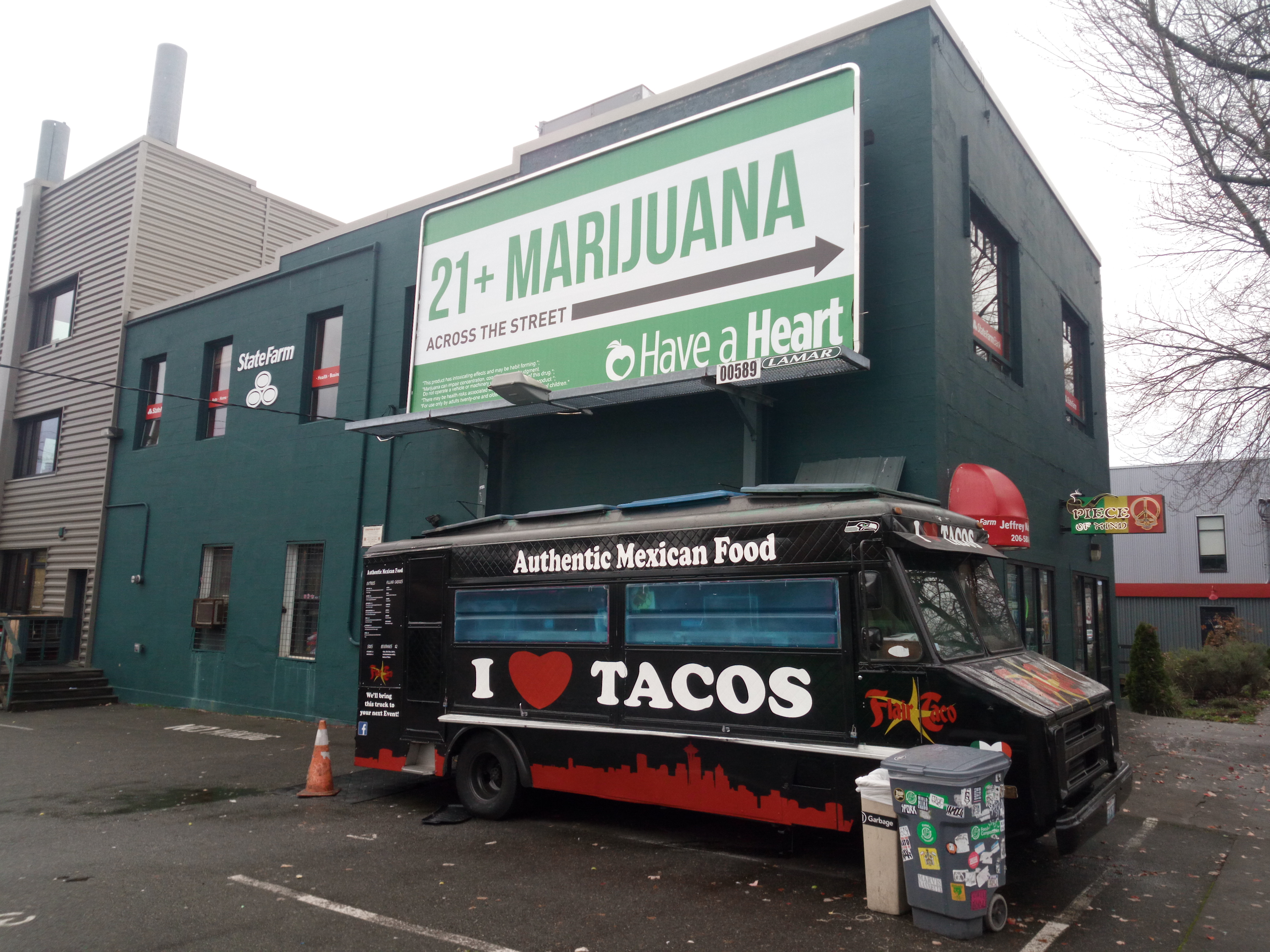
Cannabis advertising on a billboard in Seattle

Cannabis advertising is the advertising of cannabis products to consumers by the cannabis industry through a variety of media. It is regulated by U.S. states. Some or all forms of cannabis advertising are banned in many countries.

== Regulation ==
Severely limiting advertising is considered part of a "grudging toleration" approach to cannabis.

Beckley Foundation created New Draft Framework Convention on Cannabis Control in 2010 with Comprehensive ban proposal.

California specifically prohibits false health claims in advertising, as does Washington State. Washington also prohibits advertising to children and "depictions of cannabis plants".

Mail delivery of print advertising for cannabis is prohibited by U.S. Federal regulations and laws, and traditional print media may face "fear of driving away other advertisers", creating an advertising market in local alternative newsweeklies.

Canada's national cannabis legalization imposes strict rules on advertising "similar to those governing the sale of cigarettes".

== Anti-cannabis advertising ==
Anti-cannabis advertising campaigns, usually run as public service announcements, have included the Stoner Sloth campaign in Australia, DrugsNot4Me in Canada, and several campaigns created by Partnership for a Drug-Free America including the "pot surgeon" PSA from the 1990s.

== Cannabis advertising campaigns ==
Campaigns can employ satire, creative collaborations including musicians, comics artists, and sports teams; seasonal themes with limited-edition merchandise; and other techniques to get consumers' attention, as well as appealing directly and indirectly to cannabis rights. Notable campaigns have included:

- Medmen's "Forget Stoner" Campaign (Created by B.J. Carretta)
- Weedmaps' #weedfacts Campaign
- A form of cross-promotion for cannabis and fast food was used in three California Jack in the Box locations in conjunction with the January 1, 2018 cannabis legalization under Proposition 64.

== See also ==
- Cannabis advertising in Denver
- Tobacco advertising
- Alcohol advertising
