= Cannabis in Florida =

Florida's Medical Marijuana Universal Symbol

Cannabis in Florida is illegal for recreational use. Possession of up to 20 grams (0.71 oz) is a misdemeanor offense, punishable by up to a year in jail, a fine of up to $1000, and the suspension of one's driver's license. Several cities and counties have enacted reforms to apply lesser penalties, however.

Medical use was legalized in 2016 by way of a constitutional amendment. Appearing on the ballot as Amendment 2, the initiative was approved with 71% of the vote.

== The Victor Licata case ==
On October 16, 1933, 21-year-old Victor Licata used an axe to murder his parents, two brothers, and a sister while they were asleep. Despite evidence Licata had a pre-existing history of mental illness, police and the press made unattributed claims that he was "addicted" to marijuana. On October 17, 1933, the Tampa Bay Times wrote:

W. D. Bush, city chief detective, said he had made an investigation prior to the crime and learned the slayer had been addicted to smoking marihuana cigarettes for more than six months.

However, a day later the Chief of Tampa Police Department downplayed the role the drug had in the murders, although he pledged himself to the cause of marijuana prohibition:

Maybe the weed only had a small indirect part in the alleged insanity of the youth, but I am declaring now and for all time that the increasing use of this narcotic must stop and will be stopped." (October 18, 1933)

An October 20, 1933, editorial on page six of the Tampa Morning Tribune was entitled "Stop This Murderous Smoke". The editorial writer called for the prohibition of marijuana:

... it may or may not be wholly true that the pernicious marijuana cigarette is responsible for the murderous mania of a Tampa young man in exterminating all the members of his family within his reach — but whether or not the poisonous mind-wrecking weed is mainly accountable for the tragedy its sale should not be and should never have been permitted here or elsewhere.

== Medical use ==
=== CBD oil legalized (2014) ===
On June 16, 2014, Governor Rick Scott signed into law Senate Bill 1030 – the "Compassionate Medical Cannabis Act" – to allow the use of low-THC, high-CBD cannabis oil produced from the strain of cannabis known as Charlotte's Web. Qualifying conditions allowed under the bill were epilepsy, cancer, and amyotrophic lateral sclerosis. It passed the House 111–7 and Senate 30–9.

=== Failed Amendment 2 initiative (2014) ===
In 2013, supporters of a constitutional amendment to legalize medical cannabis began collecting signature to place the issue on the 2014 ballot. The group United for Care turned in 745,613 of the required 683,149 signatures, and on January 27, 2014, the Supreme Court of Florida ruled 4-3 that the initiative had successfully qualified. Appearing on the ballot as Amendment 2, the initiative ultimately failed with 57.6% of the vote (this was short of the 60% supermajority required for constitutional amendments in Florida). Contributing to its defeat was casino magnate Sheldon Adelson, who donated $5.5 million to the initiative's opposition campaign. The main sponsor in support of the initiative was attorney John Morgan, who spent close to $4 million.

=== Right to Try Act expanded (2016) ===
House Bill 307 was signed into law by Governor Scott on March 25, 2016, to expand the state's Right to Try Act to allow terminally ill patients to use cannabis. The bill also sought to address problems that had arisen with the implementation of the state's CBD law that was approved in 2014. House Bill 307 passed the House 99–16 and the Senate 28–11.

=== Approved Amendment 2 initiative (2016) ===
In 2016, a second attempt was made to pass a constitutional amendment to legalize medical cannabis in Florida. Appearing on the ballot as Amendment 2, the initiative was approved on November 8, 2016, with 71.3% of the vote. The initiative legalized the use of cannabis with a doctor's recommendation for treatment of: cancer, epilepsy, glaucoma, positive status for human immunodeficiency virus (HIV), acquired immune deficiency syndrome (AIDS), post-traumatic stress disorder (PTSD), amyotrophic lateral sclerosis (ALS), Crohn's disease, Parkinson's disease, multiple sclerosis, chronic nonmalignant pain caused by a qualifying medical condition or that originates from a qualified medical condition, or other comparable debilitating medical conditions.

Under Amendment 2, a patient can access medical cannabis if a physician determines that the benefits of the drug would likely outweigh the potential health risks. Initially, Florida regulations did not allow for smoking the medication; instead it could only be consumed by vaping or as oils, sprays, or pills. However, on May 25, 2018, Leon County Circuit Court Judge Karen Gievers ruled that the ban on smoking was unconstitutional. That ruling was appealed by the administration of Governor Rick Scott, but the administration of Governor Ron DeSantis dropped the appeal and asked for the legislature to lift the restriction. A bill that removed the prohibition on smoking was signed into law in March 2019. In September 2020, sales of edible products began shortly after the Florida Department of Health published regulations to allow such sales.

== Recreational use ==
=== Invalidated 2022 initiatives ===
In April 2021, the Florida Supreme Court ruled 5–2 that an initiative to legalize recreational cannabis was "affirmatively misleading" and therefore would not appear on the 2022 ballot. Prior to the ruling, the group Make it Legal Florida had collected 556,049 valid signatures of 891,589 required to qualify for the ballot. The court invalidated the initiative because the summary, which was limited to 75 words, did not specify that cannabis would remain illegal under federal law. The challenge was brought before the court by Attorney General Ashley Moody.

A second initiative to legalize recreational cannabis, spearheaded by the group Sensible Florida, was struck down by the court in a 5–2 ruling in June 2021. The court again ruled that the summary was "affirmatively misleading", in agreement with a September 2019 challenge brought by Attorney General Moody.

=== Adult Personal Use of Marijuana initiative (2024) ===
In August 2022, a proposed constitutional amendment was filed by the group Smart & Safe Florida to legalize recreational cannabis in Florida. In June 2023, the Florida Department of State confirmed that 967,528 valid signatures had been submitted of 891,523 required to qualify for the 2024 ballot. Later in June, Attorney General Ashley Moody filed a 49-page legal brief urging the Florida Supreme Court to remove the initiative from the ballot. In April 2024, the court ruled 5–2 that the initiative was constitutional and would remain on the ballot. Passage of the initiative was opposed by Governor Ron DeSantis and the Republican Party of Florida.

Although the amendment achieved a majority 56% support among voters on the November 2024 ballot, it failed to reach the 60% supermajority required for adoption.

== County and municipal reforms ==
=== Miami-Dade County (2015) ===
In June 2015, Miami-Dade County commissioners approved by a 10–3 vote a plan to allow civil citations to be issued for possession of up to 20 grams (¾ oz) of cannabis. Persons issued a citation are required to pay a $100 fine or perform two days of community service.

=== Broward County (2015) ===
In November 2015, Broward County commissioners approved by a unanimous vote a plan to allow civil citations to be issued for possession of up to 20 grams (¾ oz) of cannabis. The penalty was set at $100 for a first offense, $250 for a second, and $500 for a third.

=== Palm Beach County (2015) ===
In December 2015, Palm Beach County commissioners approved by a 4–1 vote a plan to allow civil citations to be issued for possession of up to 20 grams (¾ oz) of cannabis. First and second offenses are punishable by a $100 fine; a third offense cannot be cited. Instead of a fine, cited individuals can opt for 10 hours of community service.

=== Tampa (2016) ===
In March 2016, Tampa city council approved by a 5–1 vote a plan to allow civil citations to be issued for possession of up to 20 grams (¾ oz) of cannabis. The penalty was set at $75 for a first offense, $150 for a second, and $300 for a third.

=== Orlando (2016) ===
In May 2016, Orlando city council approved by a 4–3 vote a plan to allow civil citations to be issued for possession of up to 20 grams (¾ oz) of cannabis. The penalty was set at $100 for a first offense and $200 for a second. As an alternative, eight hours of drug education or community service can be substituted. The program went into effect in October 2016.

=== Other ===
Other cities and counties that have approved decriminalization ordinances are: Miami Beach (2015), Hallandale Beach (2015), Key West (2015), West Palm Beach (2015), Volusia County (2016), Osceola County (2016), Alachua County (2016), Port Richey (2016), Cocoa Beach (2019), and Sarasota (2019).

== See also ==
- Florida's Domestic Marijuana Eradication Program
