= Raymond Winbush =

American scholar

- Born: Raymond Arnold Winbush; March 31, 1948 (age 77); Pittsburgh, Pennsylvania, U.S.
- Occupation(s): Scholar, author, researcher, psychologist, educator

Raymond Arnold Winbush a.k.a. Tikari Bioko (born March 31, 1948) is an American scholar and activist known for his systems-thinking approaches to understanding the impact of racism/white supremacy on the global African community. He is currently Research Professor and Director of the Institute for Urban Research at Morgan State University in Baltimore, Maryland.

== Biography ==
=== Early life and education ===
Winbush is one of five children and the middle of three sons born to Harold Winbush, a Cleveland, Ohio steel worker, and Dorothy Winbush, a housewife. A depressed economy, low wages, and racial discrimination produced financial hardships for the family and in 1948 (the year of Winbush's birth), the family left Pittsburgh and moved to the east side of Cleveland, Ohio to begin anew. At the request of his elementary school art teacher, Winbush was tested and scored high on the Stanford-Binet Intelligence Test. Life changed for Winbush when he was bussed from his poor, Hough Avenue neighborhood to an accelerated school in a middle-class and predominantly Jewish neighborhood seven miles from his family's home. At twelve years old, Winbush realized differences between his educational experiences and those of his brothers. Much of Winbush's early childhood narrative is detailed in his first book, The Warrior Method.

After graduating from Cleveland's John Adams High School in 1966, Winbush entered Oakwood College (now Oakwood University) in Huntsville, Alabama where he won consecutive Ford Foundation Intensive Summer Studies Program scholarships to Harvard and Yale universities in 1968 and 1969 respectively. In 1970, Winbush graduated with honors and received his BA in psychology from Oakwood and later served the college as professor and chair of Behavioral Sciences from 1973 until 1977. Winbush earned his MA (1973) and PhD (1976) in clinical psychology from the University of Chicago. His thesis, "A Quantitative Exploration into Proxemic Behavior," was a study of the cross-cultural differences of spacing behavior in public. His dissertation, "A Quantitative Exploration into the Theoretical Formulations of Erik H. Erikson Concerning Black Identity," examined Erikson's fifth "Age of Man" and empirically refuted Erikson's ideas concerning identity development in young Blacks.

=== Career ===
After serving as chair and assistant professor of Behavioral Sciences at Oakwood University and as Associate Professor of psychology at Alabama A&M University from 1973 to 1980, Winbush was named assistant provost and adjunct professor in the Department of Psychology at Vanderbilt University in 1980. From June 1986 until July 1989, he served as the first director of the Joseph Johnson Black Cultural Center at Vanderbilt and was instrumental in examining enrollment and retention of African-American and other students of color at the university. Between 1975 and 2001, Winbush's research established numerous projects to raise awareness of America's race relations and their impact upon the lives of Black people. He received grants to further his work from the National Science Foundation, the Cleveland Foundation, Job Training Partnership Act of 1982, West African Research Association, Pitney Bowes, Inc., the Ford Motor Company, and the Kellogg Foundation. From 1995 until 2002, Winbush was the Benjamin Hooks Professor of Social Sciences and director of the Race Relations Institute at Fisk University in Nashville, TN. Since 2002, he has been research professor and director of the Institute for Urban Research at Morgan State University in Baltimore, Maryland and in that same year aided in establishing the Global Afrikan Congress, the largest pan-African organization in the world.

Winbush appeared as race relations expert on The Oprah Winfrey Show in 2005. His books, The Warrior Method: A Program for Rearing Healthy Black Boys and Should America Pay? Slavery and The Raging Debate on Reparations were published in 2001 and 2003 respectively. Belinda's Petition: A Concise History of Reparations For The Transatlantic Slave Trade, is described as a short introduction to the history of reparations for the European enslavement of Africans (XLibris, 2009), and is considered a "prequel" to Should America Pay?: Slavery and the Raging Debate on Reparations, and provides an overview of how reparations for the TransAtlantic Slave Trade has been a consistent theme among African people for the past 500 years. His latest book, The Osiris Papers: Reflections on the Life and Writings of Dr. Frances Cress Welsing is a discussion by several authors on the Black psychiatrist Dr. Frances Cress Welsing and her theory of why there is racism/white supremacy. It was published by Black Classic Press in 2020.
