= NNOA =

NNOA may refer to:

- National Naval Officers Association
- Norwegian Narcotic Officers Association
