= Cannabis policy of the Reagan administration =

The cannabis policy of the Reagan administration involved affirmation of the war on drugs, government funded anti-cannabis media campaigns, expanded funding for law enforcement, involvement of the U.S. military in interdiction and eradication, reduction in emphasis in drug treatment, and creation of new Federal powers to test employees and seize cannabis-related assets.

== Campaign ==
During the 1980 presidential campaign, Reagan called marijuana "probably the most dangerous drug in the United States today".

== Presidency ==
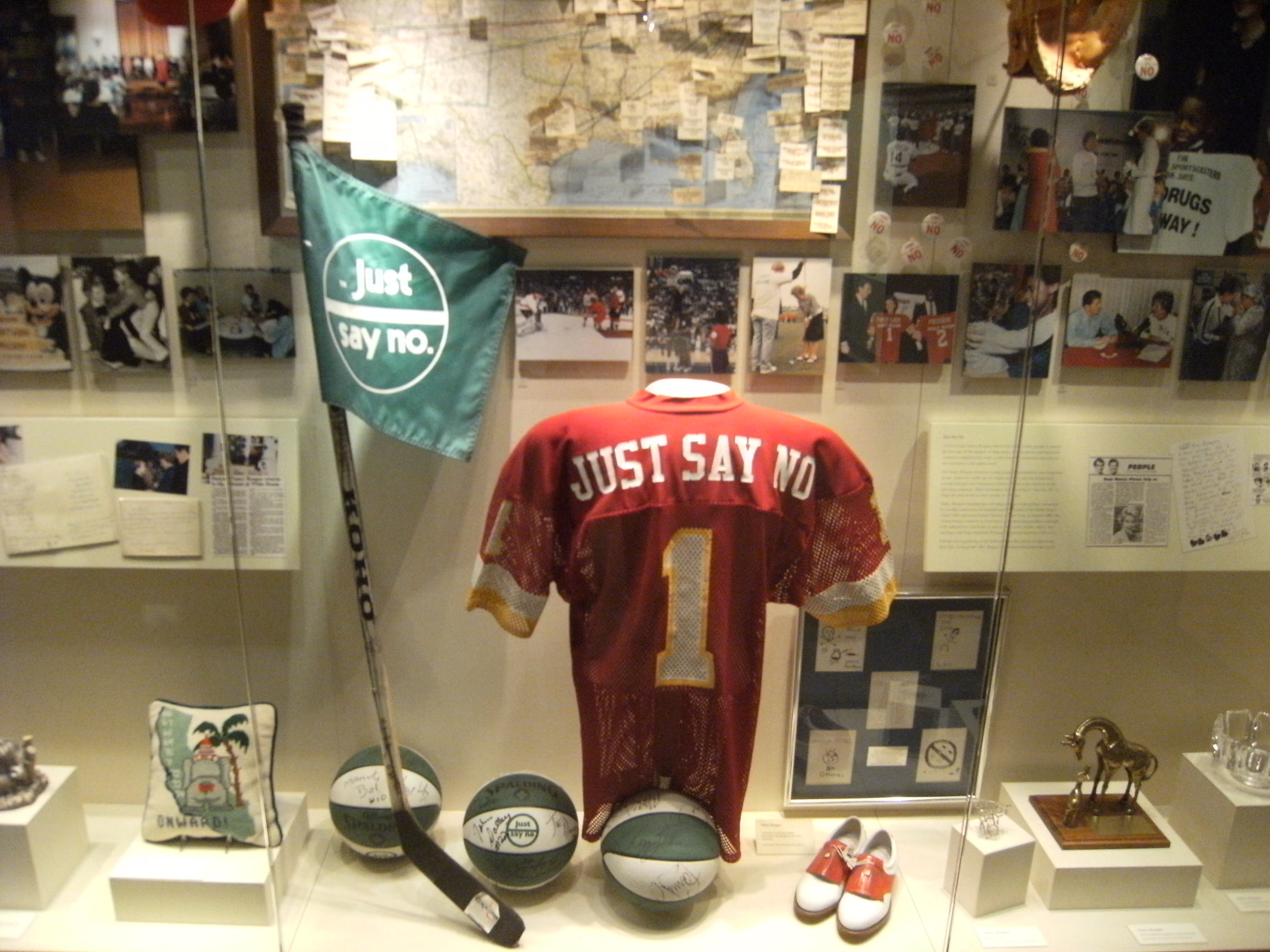
"Just Say No" memorabilia at the Reagan Presidential Library

Reagan's pick for drug czar, Carlton Turner emphasized during the selection process with Reagan's staff the necessity to perform interdiction, (cannabis) crop eradication and an "international program on something besides heroin". He told his staff "[addiction] treatment isn't what we do". Turner was a chemist who had been director of the Research Institute of Pharmaceutical Science, and run the University of Mississippi's Marijuana Research Project.

The Office of National Drug Control Policy (ONDCP) was created by the Anti-Drug Abuse Act of 1988 as an executive function under Reagan. Under Reagan the office created the Just Say No ad campaign, for whom the First Lady, Nancy Reagan was also an outspoken proponent and even spokesperson. The campaign focused on "middle-class youth smoking marijuana".

In the first few years of the Reagan Administration, the Domestic Cannabis Eradication/Suppression Program (DCE/SP) run by the DEA expanded from seven states to forty. By 1985 it was active in all fifty states. The Campaign Against Marijuana Planting was initiated in 1983 in California, to become the country's largest eradication task force and including National Guard troops and federal resources including U-2 spy planes over Northern California.

The Reagan Administration saw a change in the Posse Comitatus Act to allow the U.S. Navy to join other Federal agencies engaging in "pot war" interdiction efforts. "For the first time in American history, U.S. naval vessels began directly to interdict drug-smuggling ships in international waters," and the interdiction budget expanded from less than $4 million in 1981 to over a billion by the end of Reagan's second term. In a 1984 radio address, Reagan said his administration had seen military operations like the South Florida Task Force (created in 1982) make "interdiction and seizure of major quantities of marijuana and cocaine" and had convinced Colombia to spray herbicide on its cannabis crops. The South Florida Task Force was "the most ambitious drug-interdiction program in the nation's history – all aimed at keeping marijuana out of the country".

Under Reagan, in 1985 the DEA began the nation's first non-military public employee mass drug testing program (including testing for THC metabolite). In 1986, Reagan's Executive Order 12564 authorized drug testing for all Federal employees. The President's counsel acknowledged in 1987 that Federal courts had ruled mass testing programs unconstitutional, but the Executive Order "should survive a well-reasoned analysis", "perhaps ultimately by the Supreme Court".

In 1986, Congress passed the Anti-Drug Abuse Act, establishing mandatory minimum sentences for drug crimes and "grouped cannabis with drugs like heroin". The bill was passed without committee hearings.

Civil asset forfeiture for cannabis-related activities was a major policy decision under Reagan, "not only sending pot users to jail but also 'forfeiting everything they own'" according to Ninth Circuit Court judge Stephen S. Trott (then a Reagan administration Associate Attorney General).

== Legacy of the war on drugs ==
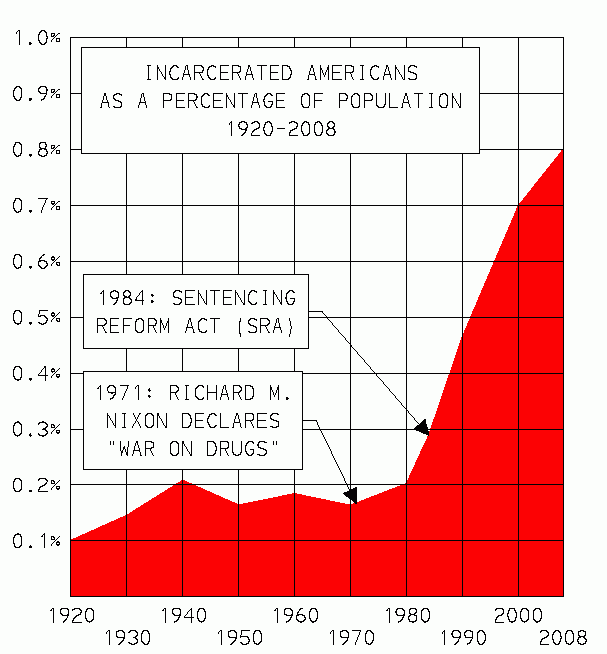
United States incarceration rate

The war on drugs was "most fiercely" waged by Presidents Reagan and his successor George H.W. Bush. A Government Accountability Office report found billion-dollar Office of National Drug Control Policy (ONDCP) media campaigns begun in the Reagan era "may have promoted perceptions among exposed youth that others' drug use was normal". The campaigns have been described as partly responsible for reframing the 21st-century debate on cannabis legalization "not by trying to shift attitudes about drugs, but by redefining marijuana as medicine and by focusing on the economic and social costs of the incarceration that has resulted from drug laws". Mandatory minimum drug sentences for cocaine and marijuana, established in the Reagan administration, have been "increasingly criticized for promoting significant racial disparities in the prison population".
