= Dog's View =

2007 anti-cannabis public service announcement

Talking Dog
- Frame from the Talking Dog PSA
- Language: English
- Release date: 2007
- Country: United States

"Dog's View", also called "Talking Dog", is a 2007 anti-cannabis public service announcement (PSA) created by the United States Office of National Drug Control Policy (ONDCP) as part of the Above the Influence campaign. The PSA features a dog who sits down at a kitchen counter and asks a teenage girl if she might be smoking too much marijuana. It was one of several ONDCP PSAs shown to increase cannabis consumption in teens. The teenage girl was played by Brittany Curran.

It has been the subject of numerous parodies and critiques, including a Joe Rogan stand-up routine, and a 2008 parody by CollegeHumor featuring Aubrey Plaza who resembles the actress in the original. The original PSA acquired over 1.1 million views on YouTube between its upload in 2008 and 2017. In 2011, Adweek profiled the PSA as one of ten that "make you want to take drugs". In 2018, it was ranked by High Times as one of the top six worst anti-cannabis ads, "hilariously inaccurate".

== See also ==
- National Youth Anti-Drug Media Campaign § Effects
