= Kentucky Center for Cannabis Research =

Cannabis research center at the University of Kentucky

Kentucky Center for Cannabis Research is a cannabis research center at the University of Kentucky College of Medicine. It was established by House Bill 604, which became law on April 26, 2022. Its purpose under the statute is "to advance the study of the use of cannabis and cannabis derivatives for the treatment of certain medical conditions and diseases". The legislation requires the university to apply to the US Drug Enforcement Administration for licenses to grow and administer medical cannabis. By October 2022, the center had received a multimillion-dollar grant to study medical cannabis for cancer patients.

Under Kentucky Senate Bill 47, the center plays a role in the state's medical cannabis regulation, by adding to the list of qualifying medical conditions.
