= Martin Heydt =

American businessman

Martin Heydt is an American businessman who founded the Worm's Way Group and served as its president and CEO until 2014. Heydt purchased an abandoned bait shop near Bloomington, Indiana in 1985 and turned the 500-square-foot building into the first Worm's Way indoor gardening store.

In 1989 Worm's Way was raided and had its records seized by the Drug Enforcement Administration as part of a 46 state crackdown on drugs called "Operation Green Merchant", after Worm's Way advertised prominently in High Times magazine. Heydt later pleaded guilty to selling marijuana growing paraphernalia and was sentenced to three years probation. He was also fined $2000.

In 2001, Heydt established the company's Employee Stock Ownership Program, allowing an initial 30% of the company's value to be purchased by its employees. The company will eventually be 100% employee-owned.

As of 2011, the Worm's Way Group has grown to encompass a total of six Worm's Way stores nationwide, a catalog and internet-based mail order department, the Sunleaves line of indoor gardening products, and a large wholesale operation.
