= National Families in Action =

American anti-drug nonprofit (1977–2022)

National Families in Action was a non-profit organization that was founded in Atlanta, Georgia in 1977. Its mission is to help children succeed by empowering parents to create an academic and social environment where children thrive and are protected from substance abuse and other high-risk behaviors. In November 2021, marking 45 years, the organization announced it would cease operations in January 2022.

== History ==
The organization obtained the nation's first state laws banning the sale of drug paraphernalia. It helped lead a national effort to help parents replicate Georgia's laws in other states to prevent the marketing of drugs and drug use to children.

Along with the Parents Resource Institute for Drug Education (PRIDE) and the National Federation of Parents for Drug-Free Youth, it helped parents form parent drug prevention groups to protect children's health. Federal officials credit the parent movement with the two-thirds reduction in past-month drug use among adolescents (ages 12–17) and young adults (ages 18–25) that occurred between 1979, when drug use among these age groups peaked, and 1992, when their drug use fell to the lowest levels since national surveys began.

During the 1980s, Sue Rusche, the organization's director, wrote a twice-weekly column on drug abuse that was syndicated by King Features to some 100 newspapers across the nation.

Throughout the 1980s and 1990s, National Families in Action published Drug Abuse Update, a quarterly publication that highlighted scientific research about alcohol, tobacco, and other drugs, their impact on the brain and body, and the work done by all segments of society to reduce drug use, abuse, addiction, and other high-risk behaviors.

With demonstration grants from the Center for Substance Abuse Prevention in the 1990s, the organization worked with families in inner-city Atlanta public housing communities to help parents protect their children from the crack epidemic and to help parents and teachers conduct Club HERO, an after-school program, for sixth-grade students at a large, inner-city middle school.

National Families in Action co-founded the Addiction Studies Program for Journalists with Wake Forest University School of Medicine in 1999. This effort is funded by the National Institute on Drug Abuse, as is the Addiction Studies Program for the States, which began in 2005. The Treatment Research Institute and the National Conference of State Legislatures became two additional partners for the states program. Both programs seek to provide a basic understanding of the science that underlies drug abuse and addiction to help journalists write more scientifically accurate stories about drugs and to help lawmakers and executive branch administrators implement more effective drug policies in their states. To further educate the public about the impact of addictive drugs on the brain and behavior, the program's directors wrote False Messengers: How Addictive Drugs Change the Brain.

In 2003, with a $4.2 million grant from Congress and the Corporation for National and Community Service, National Families in Action created the Parent Corps via a pilot program conducted in 19 schools in nine states. The program received a no-cost extension to operate for a fourth year through 2007. Principals report that with Parent Corps in their schools, positive communications with parents doubled, student attendance and grades increased, and student discipline problems and drop-out rates decreased. U.S. Representative John Lewis introduced the National Parents Corps Act in the 111th Congress. The bill would make the Parent Corps a permanent institution in the effort to protect adolescents from high-risk behaviors that endanger their health, safety, and well-being.

In 2010, National Families in Action launched But What about the Children, a public policy campaign to educate citizens about 12 provisions that must be contained in any law that legalizes marijuana to ensure that, if legalized, marijuana will not be marketed or sold to anyone under age 21.

In 2014, Marijuana Studies Program, a project of National Families in Action and its partners, introduced The Marijuana Report.Org that links browsers to daily news coverage of the marijuana issue. A one-page e-newsletter highlights key issues for subscribers every week.
