= Operation Everglades =

1980s counter-drug operation in Florida

- Operation name: Operation Everglades

Participants
- Executed by: U.S. Drug Enforcement Administration (DEA)
- Countries participating: United States

Timeline
- Date executed: 1981–1984

Operation Everglades was a large American drug interdiction operation in Collier County, Florida, that took place between 1981 and 1984, during the "war on drugs".

== Operation ==
During July 1981 Operation Everglades was implemented to identify and neutralize marijuana drug traffickers operating along the southwest coast of Florida. The U.S. Drug Enforcement Administration, United States Coast Guard, U.S. Customs Service, Internal Revenue Service, and the Collier County Sheriff's Office joined in this investigation.

The operation was centred on Everglades City, Florida, a city surrounded by miles of waterways surrounded by mangrove forest and nearby Chokoloskee, Florida, an unincorporated island community. In the early 1980s the National Park Service announced it would ban commercial fishing in Everglades National Park from 1986, which led to economic uncertainty for the local residents. Residents, knowing the waterways, began drug running for Jamaican and Mexican cartels, sailing on fishing boats out to meet motherships to smuggle square grouper, earning up to US$10,000 a night. They dubbed themselves, "Saltwater Cowboys". In April 1983, Deputy Saunders of Collier County estimated that up to 225 of the 534 city residents were suspected of taking part in the smuggling.

Phase I of the operation was executed early morning on July 7, 1983. Authorities blocked off Florida State Road 29, the only entrance to the communities, and carried out arrest warrants, leading to the arrest of 39 defendants. Phase II was initiated immediately thereafter, and was concluded on June 29, 1984 with the arrest of 40 defendants. As part of Phase II, a DEA undercover vessel accepted delivery of 24,000 pounds of marijuana from a violator's mothership in April 1984. In May, the undercover agents met with the traffickers and brokers and arrested nine violators, six of whom were leaders of the drug organization. The joint federal, state, and county investigation resulted in arrests or indictments of 256 people, almost 80% of the adult male population. More than 580,000 pounds of marijuana, with an estimated value of more than $252 million, were seized, along with cars, boats, and property worth more than $5 million.

Phase III of Operation Everglades, now called Operation Trident, continued into 1986, where the State of Florida established a proprietary business.

== Reaction ==
Locals of Everglades City criticised the operation calling it a publicity stunt designed to humiliate the town.

== See also ==
- List of cannabis seizures
