= Cannabis advertising in Denver =

Cannabis advertising in Denver is regulated by the Denver City Council in the state of Colorado. In 2012, the Denver City Council voted to ban all outdoor medical marijuana ads.

== History ==
In 2012, the Denver City Council unanimously banned all outdoor medical marijuana advertising in Colorado, where recreational marijuana is legal for adults 21 and older. This ban includes billboards, posters, bus benches, and sign twirlers. Marijuana businesses are still able to advertise on television, radio, online, and on print but must use a disclaimer indicating the products being advertised are for registered Colorado medical marijuana patients only. Council members Debbie Ortega and Christopher Herndon are behind the proposal which is an expansion of a May plan by Ortega that called for a ban on medical marijuana ads within 1,000 feet of schools, daycares and parks after she received complaints from constituents, Westword reports.

== Public opinion ==
The medical marijuana community in Denver remains divided on this issue. The Cannabis Business Alliance, one advocacy group that fought against the full ad ban, was disappointed by the outcome. The group claims that although it supported the original proposal to ban ads within 1,000 feet of schools and parks, the terms of this full ban are not clear enough in regards to outside marketing that falls outside of billboards, bus benches, and sign twirlers like festivals and merchandise. Kush Magazine went as far as saying that the ban is a violation of the First Amendment.

== Debate ==
Kush Magazine reported in June that the often loud, over-the-top advertising by medical marijuana dispensaries in Denver has to do with trying to stand out in an overcrowded marketplace, as there are approximately 200 dispensaries in Denver alone competing for more than 50,000 valid patients. Pot industry magazine The Medical Marijuana Business Daily says that the ban could force dispensaries to market themselves in more traditional ways making it harder to stand out and attract local passersby with a showy billboard or sign twirler. The magazine argued that possibly this could be a good thing because the signage the proposed ban addresses has created some backlash.

On the other side of the debate is the Medical Marijuana Industry Group (MMIG), a trade association that advocates for responsible medical marijuana regulation at the local, state, and national level, who actively pushed for the ad ban that passed, and says the ban is ultimately positive for the industry. Michael Elliott, the executive director of MMIG explained in a Huffington Post article why he and his group supported the article. Elliott said the group supported the ordinance because it balanced public concerns with the rights of medical marijuana businesses, allowing continued access to most advertising venues while addressing problematic marketing practices. He added that patients would still be able to find dispensaries easily under the new rules.

The Associated Press reports that Colorado attorney Lenny Frieling, an outspoken marijuana legalization advocate, did not want marijuana singled out like this saying, "I don't think any medicines should be advertised, period, end of story. Whether it's medical marijuana or something that will give me an erection for eight hours, I find it all inappropriate," Frieling said. "Ban it all or don't ban any of it." However most of Denver's city council members disagreed with Frieling and do want to give medical marijuana businesses the ability to advertise—just not in the over-the-top way that some have been. "We are still allowing advertising," Councilman Herndon, one of the backers of the ad ban said. "We just don't want it in your face."

Despite the rules against allowing dispensaries to advertise in the public space, the magazine High Times has sued the state of Colorado in order to gain advertising in print press. The law states that stores providing recreational marijuana can advertise in publications that have "reliable evidence that no more than 30 percent of the publication's readership is reasonably expected to be under the age of 21". This lawsuit argues that the inability to advertise in magazines, as well as any kind of medium, is a restriction on the freedom of speech article in the US Constitution. However, none of these policies apply to the medical marijuana business. Also accompanying the High Times magazine in this lawsuit is a local publication called Westwood. David Lane, the attorney representing High Times, states that these rules "irrationally single out Retail Marijuana Establishments for more stringent advertising restrictions than those regulating the alcohol industry, although the Colorado Constitution calls for the regulation of marijuana ‘in a manner similar to alcohol.’" This lawsuit, commencing in February, still has not come to any conclusion.

In August of 2014, Colorado public health officials started an advertising campaign targeted at teenagers warning them of the dangers of smoking marijuana during adolescence. The campaign, which is called "Don't Be a Lab Rat", is displaying human-sized cages across Colorado that display provocative messages about harm the drug can cause while the teenage body is maturing. This campaign, which also includes television commercials, has been criticized by Colorado's legal cannabis industry and has been called a scare tactic. The campaign has been funded with $2 million from the state attorney general's office, as well as the city of Denver, and foundations across the state. Mike Sukle's advertising agency was hired by the state and designed the campaign and has called the job "a monumental task".

Later that August in 2014, the city of Boulder, Colorado’s superintendent, Bruce Messinger, announced that the "Don’t Be a Lab Rat" campaign would not be appropriate for the community. Messinger stated that his objection to the campaign was that inviting pre-teen to teenage students into massive rat cages was not the most effective way to get their message across. Messinger was quoted saying "scare tactics don’t work". He then went on in the interview to question the validity of some of the studies referred to in the "Don’t Be a Lab Rat" campaign.

On the other hand, Dr. Larry Wolk, the executive director and chief medical officer at the state health department and one of the driving forces behind "Don’t Be a Lab Rat", stated that the entire intent of the campaign was to get kids to start talking amongst themselves and with adults about the possible effects of marijuana. Although the campaign was shut down in the schools within Boulder, it has been, according to Dr. Wolk, very successful in other locations. For example, the campaigns that were in Denver’s public library and downtown skate park had received much positive feedback.

In response to this campaign, U.S. Representative Jared Polis (D-Colo.) has been quoting saying: "It's a bizarre, ill-fated campaign...I think they need to go back to the drawing board on that one." Polis went on to say that "Most people who saw [the advertisements] thought they had something to do with PETA (People for the Ethical Treatment of Animals), like they are trying to free laboratory rats from the University of Colorado...And also, kids are playing in the cages." While Rep. Polis has been critical, Dr. Wolk says "We are pleased that the Don't Be a Lab Rat campaign has served as a catalyst to start a much-needed conversation among teens, parents and influencers about the potential negative effects of marijuana on developing brains...Critique and criticism of the creative elements of the campaign were to be expected and have helped further the conversation."
