= Domestic Cannabis Eradication/Suppression Program =

DEA drug removal program

The Domestic Cannabis Eradication/Suppression Program is a Drug Enforcement Administration-funded program to eradicate cannabis in the United States. DEA began the program in 1979 during the war on drugs. In the first few years of the Reagan administration, the program expanded from seven states to forty. By 1985 it was active in all fifty states.

Results of the program vary by locality. In 2015, agents pulled 2.6 million cannabis plants in California, 27 in New Hampshire, and zero in Utah.

As of 2018, the program continues alongside various degrees of legalization or decriminalization in all but three U.S. states.

== See also ==
- Campaign Against Marijuana Planting
- Florida's Domestic Marijuana Eradication Program
- Kentucky Marijuana Strike Force
- Tennessee Governor's Task Force on Marijuana Eradication
