= Washington State anti-cannabis public service announcements =

A portion of the taxes on legal cannabis sold since July, 2014 under Initiative 502 funds anti-cannabis public service announcements (PSAs) in Washington State.

== Marijuana Prevention and Education Program ==
The Washington State Department of Health Marijuana Prevention and Education Program creates the announcements and they are played on the radio, television and with movie trailers played in Washington. The Department of Health describes its activities as "Media-based education campaigns across television, internet, radio, print, and out-of-home advertising, separately reaching youth and adults, that provide medically and scientifically accurate information about the health and safety risks posed by marijuana use." In addition the Washington State Department of Social and Health Services (DSHS) says its Division of Behavioral Health and Recovery is the "Single State Authority" for substance abuse and mental health, and DSHS operates the website LearnAboutMarijuanaWA.org.

== Critique ==
An ad series involving "cool Hispanics" on billboards was removed by the state after being criticized.
