= Cannabis-sakene 2008 =

Series of criminal cases in Norway

Kannabis-sakene (Norwegian) or The Cannabis Cases (English) refers to the series of criminal cases where illegal cannabis plantations were discovered in Norway in 2007 and 2008. The case was eventually one of Norway's largest narcotics cases.

== Background ==
In November 2007, firefighters responding to a call stumbled upon a large cannabis farm in Enger in Søndre Land Municipality in Oppland county. Thus began the investigation of what was later assessed as a large drug network for the cannabis production.

== Investigation ==
Anders said in a press release in February 2008 that the agency "has a national responsibility for investigating drug related crimes, and has since the end of January become involved with investigating the cannabis plantation cases. – We're looking at what connections there are there between for firms and enterprises among the different cases, the connections for firms and enterprises that are abroad, and on the ringleaders and the network behind it, according to the head of the tactical department for investigation Anders Atle Roll-Matthiesen. A 5 March preliminary meeting was held between the involved police districts and National Criminal Investigation Service (Kripos) to discuss whether the investigation should be centralized.

The Norwegian security agency Kripos stated that the cases and plantations could probably be connected to the ringleaders abroad. There are commonalities related to both: ties to the Vietnamese-Norwegian community, and the common way in which the plantations are built and supplied with electricity. Both the equipment and the methods that were used in the system, and theft of electricity, the properties have similarities in many cases throughout the country.

The Norwegian police stated that they believe that the case has links to other countries, and mentioned England, the Netherlands and Canada as well as Norway's neighboring countries, Sweden and Denmark. Danish police attended a coordination meeting at Kripos in Oslo on 5 March.

=== Cases ===
The table below is an overview of the findings associated with the case. As of April 2008, not all the cases had been compiled.

Date discovered	Place	County	Arrested	Notes
27 June 2007	Nittedal Municipality	Akershus	?	Cannabis plantation
3 October 2007	Oslo Municipality	Oslo	?	Cannabis plantation
18 November 2007	Enger, Søndre Land Municipality	Oppland	–	Cannabis plantation
27 November 2007	Svelvik Municipality	Vestfold	?	Cannabis plantation
7 December 2007	Sarpsborg Municipality	Østfold	1	Cannabis plantation
12 December 2007	Halmstad, Rygge Municipality	Østfold	2	Cannabis plantation
13 December 2007	Sarpsborg Municipality	Østfold	1	Cannabis-plantation
28 December 2007	Kobbervikdalen, Drammen Municipality	Buskerud	1–2	Cannabis plantation
31 December 2007	Askim Municipality	Østfold	–	Recipes, cannabis leftovers and flower pots
14 January 2008	Sætre, Hurum Municipality	Buskerud	1	Cannabis plantation
24 January 2008	Sarpsborg Municipality	Østfold	1	Cannabis plantation
25 January 2008	Skogsbygda, Nes Municipality	Akershus	–	Cannabis plantation
27 January 2008	Horten Municipality	Vestfold	?	Cannabis plantation
28 January 2008	Greniskogen, Nes Municipality	Akershus	1	Cannabis plantation
6 February 2008	Rolvsøy, Fredrikstad Municipality	Østfold	–	Cannabis plantation (vacated with withered plants)
8 February 2008	Skarnes, Sør-Odal Municipality	Hedmark	3	Cannabis plantation
13 February 2008	Roverud, Kongsvinger Municipality	Hedmark	–	Cannabis plantation
14 February 2008	Kråkerøy, Fredrikstad Municipality	Østfold	1	Cannabis plantation
14 February 2008	Nome	Telemark	1	Cannabis plantation
15 February 2008	Lillehammer Municipality	Oppland	2–3	Cannabis plantation
17 February 2008	Kongsberg Municipality	Buskerud	1	Cannabis plantation
20 February 2008	Feiring, Eidsvoll Municipality	Akershus	2	Cannabis plantation
21 February 2008	Gran Municipality	Oppland	–	Cannabis plantation
21 February 2008	Åsnes Municipality	Hedmark	2	Cannabis plantation, pots not plants
24 February 2008	Øvre Eiker Municipality	Buskerud	2	Cannabis plantation
25 February 2008	Ski Municipality	Akershus	–	50 cannabis potted plants dumped on a forest path
26 February 2008	Tønsberg and Horten	Vestfold	10	4 different cannabis plantations revealed
26 February 2008	Rollag Municipality	Buskerud	1	Cannabis plantation
27 February 2008	Flatby, Enebakk Municipality	Akershus	5	Cannabis plantation
29 February 2008	Marker Municipality	Østfold	1	Cannabis plantation
29 February 2008	Rømskog Municipality	Østfold	1	Production equipment
29 February 2008	Kirkebygda, Enebakk Municipality	Akershus	1	Cannabis plantation
4 March 2008	Nes Municipality	Akershus	–	Cannabis plantation
20 March 2008	Hønefoss, Ringerike Municipality	Buskerud	2	Cannabis plantation
28 March 2008	Gan, Fet Municipality	Akershus	2	Cannabis plantation
30 March 2008	Sandefjord Municipality	Vestfold	–	Cannabis plantation
6 April 2008	Økernveien, Oslo Municipality	Oslo	?	Cannabis plantation
8 April 2008	Nordsinni, Nordre Land Municipality	Oppland	1	Cannabis plantation
22 April 2008	Lunner Municipality	Oppland	2	Cannabis plantation
23 April 2008	Trondheimsveien, Oslo Municipality	Oslo	–	Cannabis plantation
21 June 2008	Kyrkjøy, Finnøy Municipality	Rogaland	–	Outdoor Cannabis Plantation
2 July 2008	Kyrkjøy, Finnøy Municipality	Rogaland	–	Cannabis plantation in residential buildings

=== Charges and prosecution ===
By March 2008, 80 persons suspected of crimes had been charged in the case for the cultivation of the narcotic plant, and over 40 of them remanded. Nine different police districts: (Follo, Gudbrandsdal, Hedmark, Oslo, Romerike, Søndre Buskerud, Vestfold, Vestoppland and Østfold) and Anders were cooperating in the case.

On 3 April, it became known that the police suspected the owner of a chain of stores, believing that he had ties with the many cannabis farms that had been discovered. He was arrested together with four other people, when the police uncovered 500 cannabis plants on a farm he owned in Enebakk Municipality in February. Furthermore, his phone number was found in the contacts of several other indicted in connection with the other cannabis findings in other locations, though the suspect denied the charges.
