= Sinsemilla Tips =

Magazine

Sinsemilla Tips Vol. 2 No. 3, July 1981

Sinsemilla Tips was an American magazine founded in 1980 providing advice for indoor growers of cannabis. The founder was Tom Alexander who based publication of this and another magazine, The Growing Edge, in Corvallis, Oregon. Alexander distributed the first run of 1,000 copies out of his car from the Emerald Triangle to Seattle.

During its run the magazine was called "the nation's only trade magazine on the subject" of cannabis cultivation, and sold 10,000 to 20,000 copies a month. The New York Times said "many growers refer to [it] as 'the bible'." The Wall Street Journal noted in 1984 how the magazine's recommendation of bat guano (in a standing column titled "guano notes") affected international trade. A 1986 New York Times editorial also called Alexander a "an unwitting double agent in the marijuana wars" by publishing his magazines.

The magazine was a target of Operation Green Merchant. The magazine shut down in 1990, following a Green Merchant raid and seizure of Alexander's business property. The magazine's advertisements, as well as those in High Times, were used by the DEA to select targets of raids.
