= Australian Antarctic Data Centre =

Australian government data-management body

Data centre overview
- Formed: 1996; 30 years ago
- Jurisdiction: Australian Antarctic Territory and the Australian Antarctic Program
- Headquarters: Hobart, Tasmania, Australia
- Parent department: Australian Antarctic Division
- Website: data.aad.gov.au

The Australian Antarctic Data Centre (AADC) is a section of the Australian Antarctic Division (AAD), part of the Australian Government's Department of Climate Change, Energy, the Environment and Water. The AADC was established to manage Australia's Antarctic scientific data and supports the Australian Antarctic Program.

== History ==
The AADC was founded in 1996 to provide long-term management of Australia's Antarctic data and to improve the value and impact of Australian Antarctic scientific activities.

By 2004, the centre had added 118,000 records to its database, including observations from the United Kingdom and material from a Regional Sensitivity to Climate Change workshop held in Paimpont, France. It also expanded its systems to accommodate satellite-tracking data for species and became the first Australian organisation to contribute data to the Global Biodiversity Information Facility (GBIF), using web-service standards for data sharing.

== Role and services ==
The AADC manages scientific data arising from Australia's Antarctic research, including acquisition, indexing, storage, dissemination, linking and data mining. It also maps Australia's areas of interest in the Antarctic region, manages aspects of Australia's Antarctic state-of-the-environment reporting, and fabricates, installs and manages tide gauges at Australian Antarctic stations.

As Australia's Antarctic mapping agency, the AADC supports the logistical operations of the Australian Antarctic Program. Its staff assist with data capture at sea and on land, arrange satellite tasking for science campaigns, and advise on data-collection methods.

Data held by the AADC are described with metadata and made discoverable through the Catalogue of Australian Antarctic and Subantarctic Metadata (CAASM). Where appropriate, its data-delivery systems use international standards for data exchange and discovery.

== Data policy ==
The AADC supports the free and open exchange of scientific data, consistent with Article III.1(c) of the Antarctic Treaty, which provides that scientific observations and results from Antarctica should, to the greatest extent feasible and practicable, be exchanged and made freely available.

The AADC has been included among the sources searchable through the WorldWideScience global science gateway.
