= Florida's Domestic Marijuana Eradication Program =

Task force

Florida’s Domestic Marijuana Eradication Program
- Active: 1981–present
- Country: United States
- Agency: Florida Department of Agriculture and Consumer Services; Drug Enforcement Administration
- Type: multi-agency law enforcement task force
- Role: Law enforcement; marijuana eradication
- Operations jurisdiction: Federal; Florida

Website
- Domestic Marijuana Eradication Program

Florida's Domestic Marijuana Eradication Program (FL DME) is a multi-agency state and federal law enforcement program founded in 1981, jointly managed by the Drug Enforcement Administration and the Florida Department of Agriculture and Consumer Services to provide funding for local law enforcement agencies' efforts to eradicate illegal cannabis cultivation and trafficking in Florida.

The program, formed in 1981, includes the Drug Enforcement Administration, the Florida Department of Agriculture and Consumer Services' Office of Agricultural Law Enforcement, and 45 sheriff's and police departments across Florida.

== See also ==
- War on drugs
- Office of National Drug Control Policy
- Domestic Cannabis Eradication/Suppression Program
