= Stoner Sloth =

Australian anti-cannabis public service announcement

- Agency: Saatchi & Saatchi
- Client: New South Wales Department of Premier and Cabinet
- Language: English
- Media: Television
- Release date: 2015
- Country: Australia
- Budget: $500,000

"Stoner Sloth" was an anti-cannabis public service announcement series of three videos, created by Australia's New South Wales Department of Premier and Cabinet in 2015.

== Content ==
Each ad begins with a scenario involving people in public places. As everyone is acting "normal", it is all disrupted by Stoner Sloth, a sloth who reacts slowly while moaning. Stoner Sloth is meant to represent the behavior of a stereotypical stoner and its actions are accompanied by a musical cue of a guitar being weakly strummed. The human characters around Stoner Sloth usually react with disgust or disappointment.

== Reception ==
The creative firm Saatchi & Saatchi created the ads which "backfired miserably" and were an "instant and classic fail", according to trade publication Adweek. The agency defended its ads, which cost $500,000. The National Cannabis Prevention and Information Centre distanced itself from the campaign.

== See also ==
- Substance abuse prevention
