= Tennessee Governor's Task Force on Marijuana Eradication =

Task force

Tennessee Governor’s Task Force on Marijuana Eradication
- Active: 2025-present
- Country: United States
- Agency: Tennessee Bureau of Investigation; Office of the Governor of Tennessee
- Type: multi-agency law enforcement task force
- Role: Law enforcement; marijuana eradication
- Operations jurisdiction: Tennessee
- Headquarters: Chattanooga, Tennessee

Website
- TBI Drug Investigation Division

The Tennessee Governor's Task Force on Marijuana Eradication (GTFME), a multi-agency law enforcement task force founded in 1983, is managed by the Office of the Governor of Tennessee composed of local, state agencies organized expressly to eradicate illegal cannabis cultivation and trafficking in Tennessee. The Governor's Task Force is operated by the Tennessee Bureau of Investigation's Tennessee Dangerous Drugs Task Force. The eradication season lasts from May through September in Tennessee, where outdoor marijuana cultivation ranks second in the United States, behind California. The task force, divided into three regional teams, East, Middle and West, centralized marijuana eradication in the state into a coordinated multi-agency program.

The task force, created by then Tennessee Governor Lamar Alexander's Executive Order #51 in April 1983, originally included the Tennessee Alcoholic Beverage Commission, the Tennessee Bureau of Investigation, the Tennessee Highway Patrol, Tennessee National Guard, and the Tennessee Wildlife Resources Agency. A 2018 law removed the Tennessee Alcoholic Beverage Commission from the task force. The task force often uses helicopters, flown by the Tennessee Highway Patrol and Tennessee National Guard, for aerial surveillance of outdoor marijuana grow sites in rural eastern Tennessee.

== See also ==
- War on drugs
- Office of National Drug Control Policy
- Kentucky Marijuana Strike Force
