= Global Afrikan Congress =

International pan-Africanist organization

The Global Afrikan Congress (GAC) is an international umbrella organization created by and for Africans and people of African descent. The GAC's ultimate goals are to justly redistribute global resources and resist continued oppression; it seeks to accomplish these goals by demanding reparations for the exploitation of people of African heritage, supporting policies to combat institutional racism, and working for recognition and respect for Africans and people of African descent.

== About ==
The GAC has defined reparation and restitution as:

"the process of self-repair, healing and restoring of a people injured because of their group identity, and the violation of their fundamental human rights by individuals, corporation, religious and other institutions, governments and other entities."

The GAC was organized in October 2002 in Bridgetown, Barbados and is a direct outgrowth of the African-African Descendants Caucus (AADC) formed before the 2001 United Nations World Conference on Racism (UNWCAR). After the UNWCAR there was no follow-up on the part of those designated to continue the work of the AADC begun during the preparatory conferences (PREPCOMS) leading up to the UNWCAR. Organized by attorney Roger Wareham, the AADC became the leading voice of Africans throughout the world during the UNWCAR. The AADC was instrumental in getting the Transatlantic slave trade declared "a crime against humanity", and opened the door for a direct, legal assault on nations and corporations that benefited from the trans-Atlantic slave trade.

The GAC continues the AADC's work and is now organized in 35 nations, and is "the largest Pan-African Black Nationalist group in the world." Its constitutional convention, held in October 2004 in Paramaribo, Suriname, ratified a document considered by many to codify the direction in which the Pan-African movement should move during the 21st century.

== See also ==
- International Year for People of African Descent
