= Operation Green Merchant =

- Part of the war on drugs
Date	1988 – 1992
Location	46 US states
Result	1,698 arrests, seizure of 3,794 indoor growing operations and $35 million in drug assets

Belligerents
United States: DEA	marijuana growers and related hydroponic and garden businesses

Strength
DEA agents, along with local, state and federal agents from 46 states	

Operation Green Merchant was a nationwide investigation and operation targeting businesses advertising specialized horticultural equipment that was supposedly used to grow cannabis in the 1990s.

== Background ==
The DEA had decided to investigate the advertising inside the High Times and Sinsemilla Tips with the goal of shutting down the blooming indoor marijuana industry using United Parcel Service records to trace deliveries of indoor growing equipment and seeds.

The three key targets of Green Merchant were the High Times magazine, Sinsemilla Tips magazine and the Holland's Seed Bank owned by Nevil Schoenmakers.

On October 26, 1989, the DEA along with other local, state and federal agents, raided hydroponics and garden stores and business in 46 states, seizing assets and more than 100 arrests. Operation Green Merchant, which lasted from 1988 to 1992, resulted in 1,698 arrests, 3,794 indoor growing operations seized, and $35 million in drug assets seized.

== See also ==
- Martin Heydt
- Hydroponics
