= Youth Challenge International =

US-based Christian organization

- Founded: 1970 By Bishop Raul Gonzalez
- Type: Christian organization
- Location: Hartford, Connecticut
- Services: Counseling *recreational activities *resident and family liaison services *non-denominational spiritual sharing *Prayer
- Key people: Bishop Raul Gonzalez, president
- Website: www.youthchallenge.org

Youth Challenge International, originally known as Youth Challenge of Connecticut, is a Christian organization founded by Bishop Raul Gonzalez, senior pastor of Glory Chapel International Cathedral in Hartford, Connecticut.

== Branches within the United States ==
=== Youth Challenge of Connecticut ===
Youth Challenge of Connecticut serves as the headquarters of the organization. The organization holds a Connecticut State License to operate a facility for the care of substance abusive or dependent persons.

==== Programs ====
Youth Challenge Men's Home and Youth Challenge Mission for Women

- The Youth Challenge Men's Home houses 15 males, The Youth Challenge Mission for Women house 8 females
- The Programs are centered on the abstention from drugs and alcohol
- This Program uses counseling, classes, group activities, during a 4 to 6 month period

Youth Challenge Bible Training Center

- The second phase of rehabilitation for men, it houses 9 students.
- The location is a farm, where individuals are challenged to address personal, social, academic and vocational issues.
- The program aims to develop a strong work ethic.

=== Youth Challenge of Florida ===
Youth Challenge of Florida was founded in 1984, it serves males 18 years and older The facility is located on 25 arces of property in Central Florida there are Three Phases to its program. Visit the Youth Challenge of Florida at www.ycofflorida.com

- Stage One
  Commitment

The Participants make vows to themselves to forsake their drug habit in order to pursue a new lifestyle. This phase uses counseling, workskills and recreational activities for a period of four months.

- Stage Two
  Self Image

The participants change their self-image by developing self-respect, discipline and positive Attitudes. This stage provides a live-in environment for the participants creating Personal interactions vocational training and academic lessons and lasts 8 months.

- Stage Three
  Internship

The Participants complete 6 months of on-the job training. This phase offers academic achievement with a [GED] Program. After reaching a period of 18 months total in the program, the participant becomes a candidate for graduation.

== Branches outside the United States ==
=== Youth Challenge of Puerto Rico ===
Youth Challenge of Puerto Rico was established in 1982, as a Christian residential Rehabilitation program. The program serves approximately 15 adolescent males ages 13–17. The program is licensed by the government of Puerto Rico. Students of the program are offered a high School diploma while in the program. Plans are currently in the works for a program for adolescent females.

=== Youth Challenge of Kenya Africa ===
Youth Challenge of Kenya Africa serves male drug addicts. The program offers group and Individual Counseling, along with Bible Studies and Occupational Therapy.

=== Youth Challenge of Guatemala ===
Youth Challenge of Guatemala operates under a regional board, under this board exist several Programs

==== Programs ====
- Reto Juvenil de Guatemala/Youth Challenge of Guatemala

A program for adult men who are addicted to alcohol and other forms of delinquency.

- Nuevo Reto de Guatemala/New Challenge

Nuevo Reto (New Challenge) is a Christian ministry that reaches the street children in Guatemala. Founded in 1991, the mission aims to rescue youngsters from the streets and helping them to grow in a Christian family atmosphere. The program plans to operate in two phases; the first being a house for at least 40 youngsters under the age of twelve, the second- a house for boys older than twelve.

- La Cocina de Amor/ The kitchen of Love

Cocina del Amor operates as a church and a program. the program have branches throughout Guatemala, Cuba, Nicaragua.

- Libre Infancia/ Children in Freedom

Libre Infancia was founded in 1995. The program serves the children of families that live in the "Basurero Municipal" in the capital city of Guatemala City. The program plans to be a small city, housing 500 children, 30 houses in addition to activities centers, health centers and other buildings. The program is led by Pastor Alvarez, who leas

- Amigos del Pobre/ Friends of The Poor

== See also ==
- The First Cathedral
- Archbishop LeRoy Bailey Jr.
