= American Anti Drug Council =

American Anti-Drug Council logo

American Anti-Drug Council originated as an anti-marijuana campaign. The mission of this council is to help teens stand up to negative choices and aims to educate about the dangers of Illegal drugs. The council tries to keep pages on social network sites from posting illegal drug content. The council has even blasted some celebrities for posting smoking selfies.

The AADC is located in the state of Tennessee and was established in 2013.

== AADC campaigns ==
The American Anti-Drug Council has run many anti-drug campaigns. In 2014 it ran a campaign called "College 101" which looked at how college kids are using illegal drugs to stay up longer to study. Another was the "Forget Pot" campaign, which focused on how smoking marijuana has caused a lot of teens to fail classes or even drop out of high school. Its 2015 campaign is called "Pick Healthy." This is not focused on a particular drug, but tries to get people to pick healthy fruits instead of using deadly drugs. This campaign wants people to use the "#pickhealthy" hashtag when someone is eating a healthy treat.

== Blasting celebrities ==
The American Anti-Drug Council has blasted many celebrities for posting smoking selfies or drug related content. The AADC requests that if these celebrities post this kind of content they should have +18 in their bio which means no one under 18 should view their page. The AADC has posted comments on Snoop Dogg's Instagram claiming that he is "targeting the youth to smoke marijuana." In 2017 the AADC changed its social media pages over to Free Vibe. It’s more focused on the newer generation.
