= Norwegian Narcotic Officers Association =

Norwegian organization advocating against drug liberalization

Norwegian Narcotic Officers Association (NNOA)
- Norsk narkotikaforebyggende forening
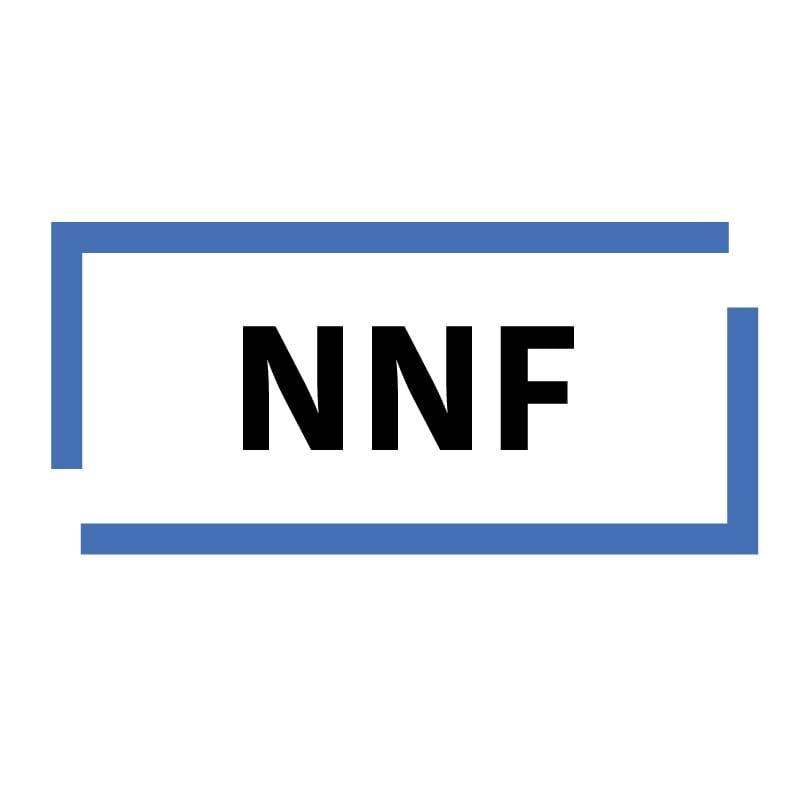
- Official logo used since 2023
- Abbreviation: NNOA, NNF
- Formation: 16 November 1991; 34 years ago
- Founded at: Drammen, Norway
- Members: approx. 3,500 (2021)
- Chairman of the board: Jan Erik Bresil
- Deputy chairman: Geir Evanger
- Website: www.narkotika.no

Norwegian Narcotic Officers Association (NNOA; Norwegian: Norsk narkotikaforebyggende forening, NNF) is a Norwegian lobbying organization. The organization is advocating for a strict drug enforcement law retaining punishment as a reaction to illegal drug use, only excluding punishment for people suffering from severe substance use disorder. It has established itself as opponents of drug liberalization, and is often critiqued for employing an outdated approach to policing.

It was established in November 1991 as an attempt to prevent and reduce organized crime related to illegal drugs. As of January 2023, senior police constable Jan Erik Bresil is the leader of the organization, and state attorney Geir Evanger functions as the deputy chairman.
