= Operation Kruz Control =

- Part of the Mexican drug war and the war on drugs
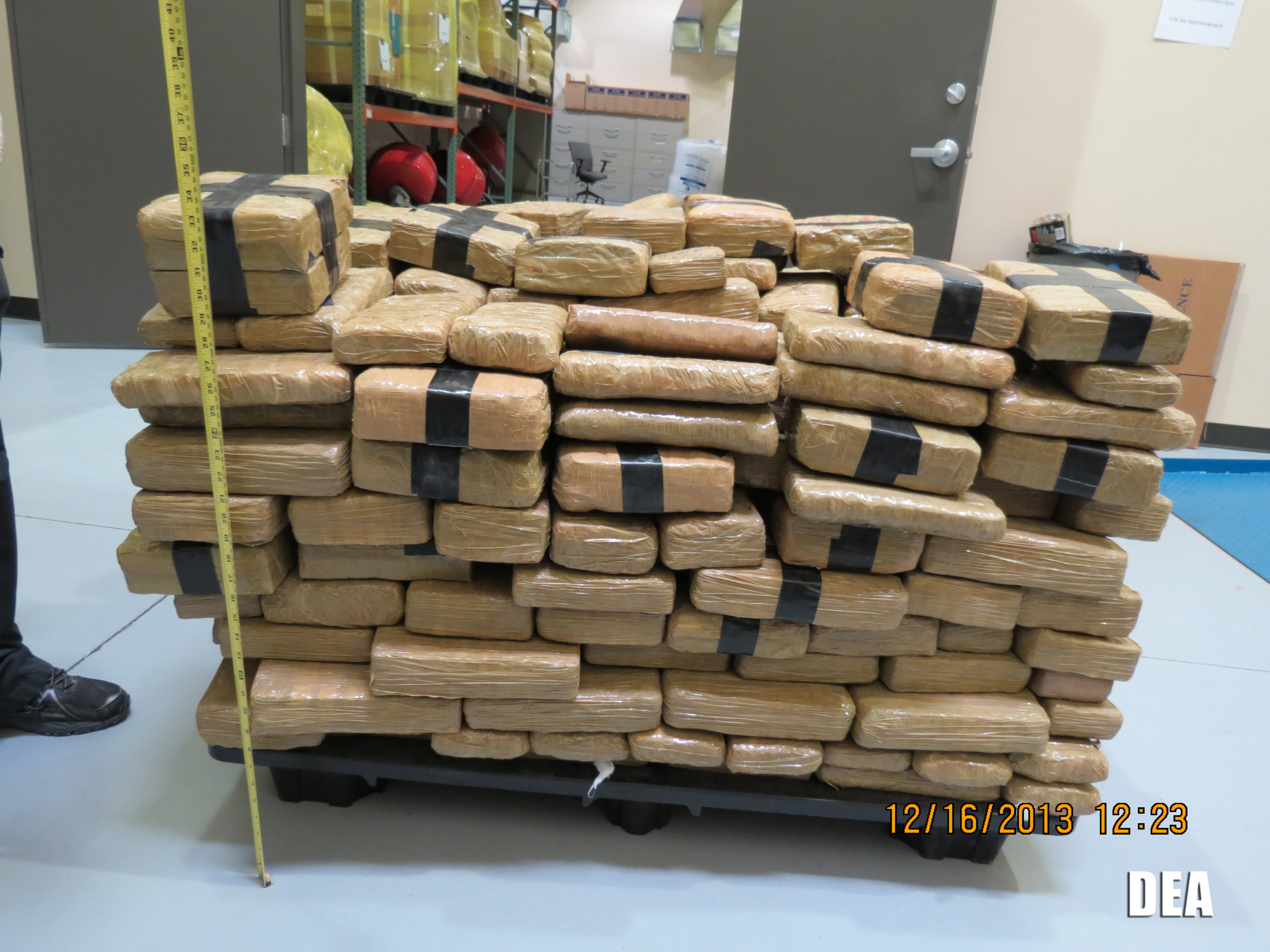
- Marijuana seized during the operation
Date	December 2012 – December 2013
Location	Arizona, New Mexico
Result	Operational success

Belligerents
United States	Sinaloa Cartel

Operation Kruz Control was a twelve-month, multi-agency investigation of a drug trafficking organization in southern Arizona, between December 2012 and December 2013.

According to Drug Enforcement Administration (DEA) officials, the Phoenix-based Luiz Armando Cruz organization, which works for the Sinaloa Cartel of northern Mexico, is responsible for the smuggling of thousands of pounds of marijuana into Arizona and New Mexico and the smuggling of the proceeds back into Mexico, via the Agua Prieta corridor. The Cruz organization utilized both drivers in vehicles and backpackers to transport drug loads through remote desert areas near San Simon and Willcox, Arizona, and then to Tucson and Phoenix for further distribution.

DEA Special Agent in Charge Doug Coleman: "DEA and its partners are successfully striking back at drug traffickers who use the Arizona corridor to move their drugs into the United States and their illicit proceeds back to Mexico.... This investigation identified a transportation cell that used human backpackers to smuggle thousands of pounds of marijuana across the Arizona/Mexico border. The message to these criminals should be clear—use the cross border area at your own risk."

On the evening of December 13, 2013, police in Phoenix and Willcox conducted arrests and search warrants and raided stash houses believed to be used by the Cruz organization, arresting eleven individuals and seizing "1,400 pounds of marijuana, seven rifles, two handguns, a shotgun, two homes, nine vehicles, an ATV quad and a bank account." Furthermore, since the beginning of the operation in December 2012, Kruz Control investigators seized $200,000, 27,000 pounds of marijuana, six vehicles and a King Quad ATV in other actions.

The following were arrested in police raids on December 13, 2013: Luis Armando Cruz, 39; Carlos Antonio Garcia, 31; Sergio Garcia-Morales, 32; Alma Dolores Escalante-Figueroa (wife of Cruz), 39; Felipe Escalante-Reyes, 22; Carime Itsel Reyes-Escalante, 19; Carlos Ramirez, 42; Sergio Robert Ramos-Moreno, 19; Trevon Xavier Marcus-Bondae, 18; Maxine Carter, 25; and Jeremiah Steven Woolsey, 24.

The following agencies participated in Operation Kruz Control: Drug Enforcement Administration (DEA), U.S. Border Patrol and its Tactical Unit (BORTAC), the Internal Revenue Service Criminal Investigation, the U.S. Marshals Service, Graham County Attorney's Office, Coolidge Police Department, National Drug Intelligence Center Document and Media Exploitation (DOMEX), and Arizona SWAT teams from the Mesa Police Department, Apache Junction Police Department, Tempe Police Department, and the Pinal County Sheriff's Office.
