= National Marijuana Initiative =

American organization

The National Marijuana Initiative (NMI) is an American organization founded in 2001. It is one of three initiatives under the federal High Intensity Drug Trafficking Areas program. The organization advocates for making educated decisions while informing the public of the consequences of policy change. It works in tandem with the 32 High Intensity Drug Trafficking Areas Program to enact the National Drug Control Strategy.

== Organization ==
The NMI provides specialized presentations by experts and training courses with the purpose of enabling policymakers and their representative populations to make an informed decision about marijuana use and its risks. The Office of National Drug Control Policy established this initiative under the Federal High Intensity Drug Trafficking Areas Program (HIDTA) in order to engage on a regional and national level with national drug threats. With the emphasis on educational outreach to citizens, the National Marijuana Initiative website encourages the public to call at (305) 715-7600.

== Education ==
The NMI provides information on the cultivation of marijuana and its effect on the human body, as well as its economic and environmental impact. Economic advice provided by NMI includes advice for individuals considering entering the cannabis industry as an owner or investor depending on the person's state. Other information provided is information on the likelihood of people to go to jail for marijuana related crimes and other related data. The NMI also provides information on the environmental impact of both legal and illegal growth operations. Topics discussed in detail with links to further resources are: dangers of pesticides, trouble with endangering animals, illicit water use, erosion, and excessive energy use.
