= Above the Influence =

Anti-drug campaign

Above the Influence originated as a government-based campaign of the National Youth Anti-Drug Media Campaign conducted by the Office of National Drug Control Policy in the United States that included broad messaging to focus on substances most abused by teens, intended to deliver both broad prevention messaging at the national level and more targeted efforts at the local community level.

The media campaign had two distinct areas of focus: a teen-targeted Above the Influence Campaign, and a young-adult-targeted anti-meth campaign. By law, the purpose of the media campaign was to prevent drug abuse among teens in the United States; increase awareness of adults of the impact of drug abuse on young people; and encourage parents and other interested adults to discuss with young people the dangers of illegal drug use.

The goal of this campaign was to help teens stand up to negative pressures, and influences. The more aware one becomes about the influences around them, the more prepared they will be to face them, including the pressure to use drugs and alcohol.

"Above the Influence" is symbolized by its campaign logo featuring an arrow pointing up with a circle around it.

As of March 2014, federal funding and oversight of Above the Influence ceased, and it transitioned to become a program of the not-for-profit Partnership for Drug-Free Kids.

== Studies ==
In 2006, the Government Accountability Office released the results of a five-year study, concluding that the previous "My Anti-Drug" campaign was ineffective, and likely counterproductive, leading those exposed to an increased perception that others use marijuana, stating, "analysis also indicated that among current, non-drug-using youth, exposure to the campaign had unfavorable effects on their anti-drug norms and perceptions of other youths’ use of marijuana — that is, greater exposure to the campaign was associated with weaker anti-drug norms and increases in the perceptions that others use marijuana."

In 2011, Ohio State University released the results of an independent scientific study stating that the Above the Influence campaign appears to have effectively reduced marijuana use by teenagers.

"Evidence for the success of Above the Influence is especially heartening because the primary independent evaluation of its predecessor campaign, 'My Anti-Drug', showed no evidence for success," said Michael Slater, principal investigator of the study and professor of communication at OSU. "The 'Above the Influence' campaign appears to be successful because it taps into the desire by teenagers to be independent and self-sufficient." Slater also acknowledged limitations of the study, such as findings that were based on survey results and not a randomized, experimental design in which some youth saw the ONDCP campaign and others did not. Another limitation was that the study, while taking place in twenty communities around the U.S., did not use a random sample of U.S. youth.

== See also ==
- TheTruth.com
- Public Service Announcement
