= National Family Partnership =

The National Family Partnership (NFP), formerly known as the National Federation of Parents for Drug Free Youth, is a nonprofit organization that unites parental rights groups across the United States in opposing youth drug use. First Lady Nancy Reagan was the founding and honorary chair of the National Family Partnership. The NFP operates an annual Red Ribbon Campaign to have parents pledge to raise drug-free youth. The comedian and actress Carol Burnett first referenced the NFP in a Good Housekeeping article about her daughter's drug use.

The organization was founded in Silver Spring, Maryland, in April 1980 to unite over 420 local parental right's groups in combined lobbying of the United States Congress for stronger drug laws. Believing President Jimmy Carter to have been weak on drug crime, especially for initially supporting the decriminalization of cannabis, the NFP supported Ronald Reagan in the 1980 United States presidential election. After Reagan signed the Anti-Drug Abuse Act of 1986 to shift most federal substance abuse spending from community organizations to law enforcement in response to the "crack epidemic," the NFP faced financial difficulties and leadership struggles. In 1988, the group shut down but was later revived into its modern form.
