= Just Say No =

Anti-drug ad campaign

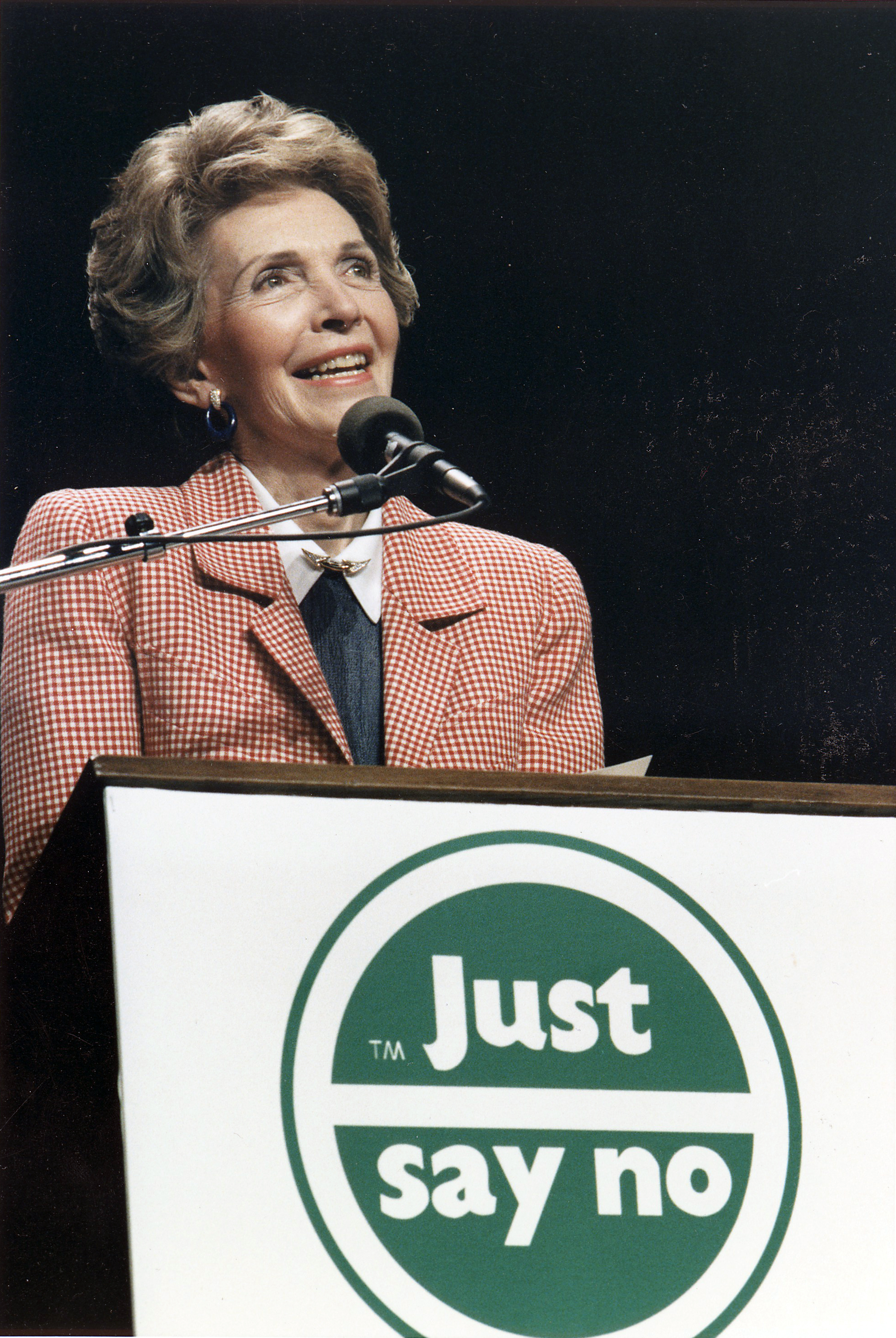
Nancy Reagan speaking at a "Just Say No" rally in Los Angeles, in 1987

"Just Say No" was an advertising campaign prevalent during the 1980s and early 1990s as a part of the U.S.-led war on drugs, aiming to discourage children from engaging in illegal recreational drug use by offering various ways of saying no. The slogan was created and championed by Nancy Reagan during her husband's presidency.

== Initiation ==
The campaign emerged from a substance abuse prevention program supported by the National Institutes of Health, pioneered in the 1970s by University of Houston Social Psychology Professor Richard I. Evans. Evans promoted a social inoculation model, which included teaching student skills to resist peer pressure and other social influences. The campaign involved University projects done by students across the nation. Jordan Zimmerman, then a student at University of South Florida, and later an advertising entrepreneur, won the campaign. The anti-drug movement was among the resistance skills recommended in response to low peer pressure, and Nancy Reagan's larger campaign proved to be an effective dissemination of this social inoculation strategy.

Nancy Reagan first became involved during a campaign trip in 1980 to Daytop Village in New York City. She recalls feeling impressed by a need to educate the youth about drugs and drug abuse. Upon her husband's election to the presidency, she returned to Daytop Village and outlined how she wished to help educate the youth. Nancy Reagan's longtime Chief of Staff James Rosebush helped her expedite what she viewed as one of her legacies as First Lady. She stated in 1981 that her best role would be to bring awareness about the dangers of drug abuse:

Understanding what drugs can do to your children, understanding peer pressure and understanding why they turn to drugs is ... the first step in solving the problem.

In July 1984, Nancy Reagan visited Longfellow Elementary School in Oakland, California, to counsel schoolchildren against drug use. When asked by a schoolgirl on how to respond if offered drugs, Reagan responded "just say no," but the phrase initially went unnoticed. In January 1985, the school reviewed footage from Nancy Reagan's visit, and a 12-year-old student named Nomathemby Martini suggested that the district start a Just Say No club. Under the leadership of community organizers Tom Adams and Joan Brann, Just Say No clubs spread nationwide. In a September 1986 televised address, Nancy and Ronald Reagan credited the initial Oakland organization for popularizing the slogan, which the White House passed onto the National Institute on Drug Abuse to publish marketing developed by the advertising firm DDB Worldwide and the Ad Council nonprofit. After the White House began licensing the slogan to Procter & Gamble for branded public service announcements, Adams and Brann resigned and joined Representative Charles Rangel in criticizing the commercialization of the organization.

== Efforts ==
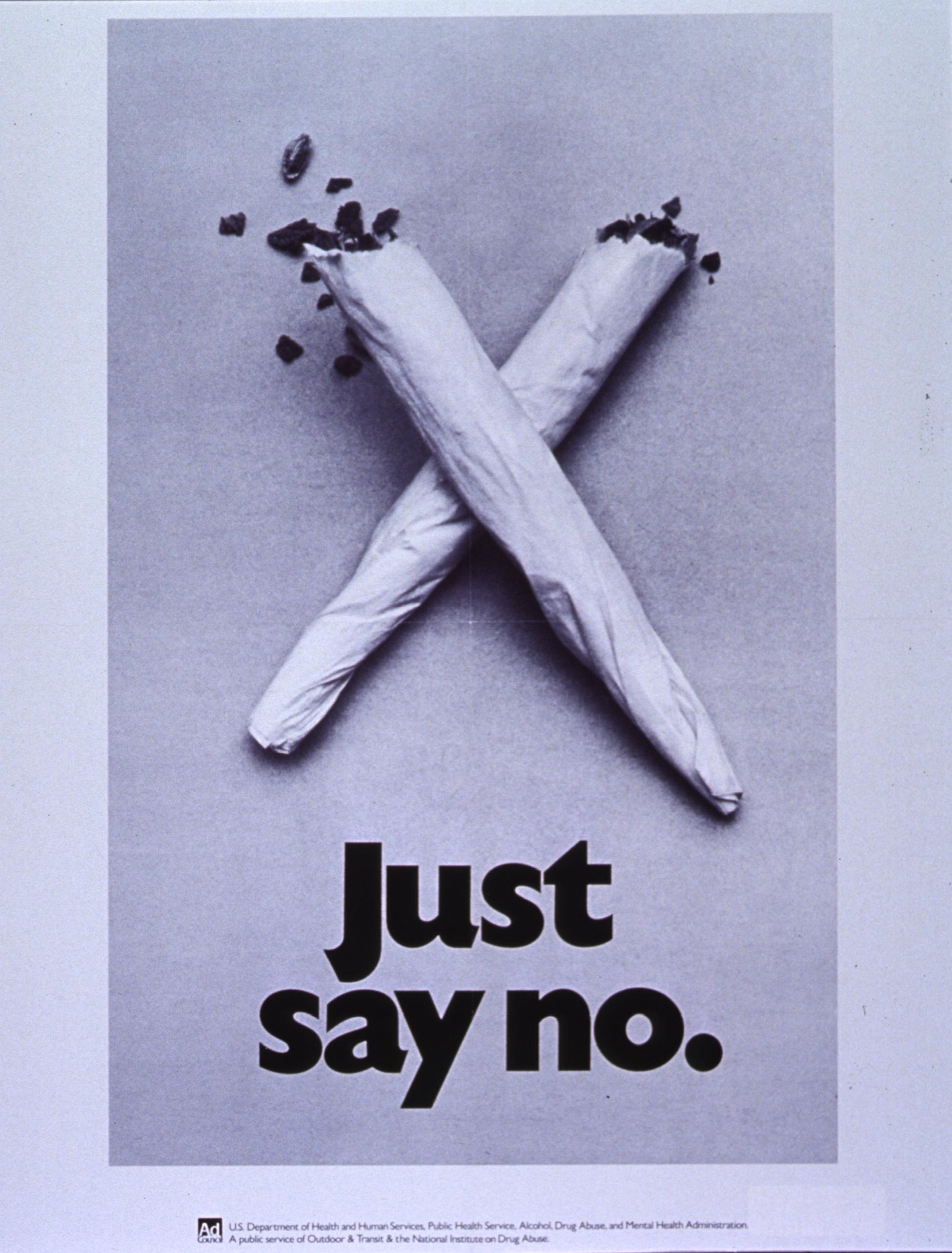
A U.S. government PSA from the Alcohol, Drug Abuse, and Mental Health Administration for the war on drugs

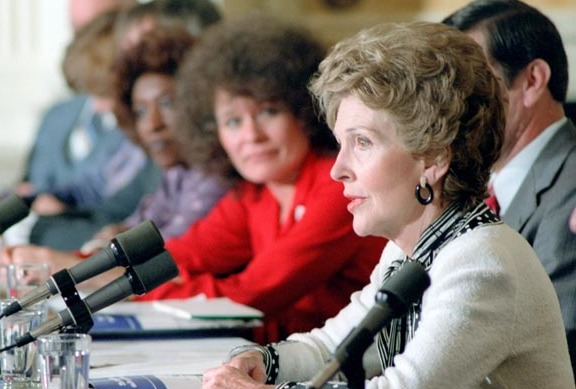
Nancy Reagan hosts the First Ladies Conference on Drug Abuse at the White House in March 1982.

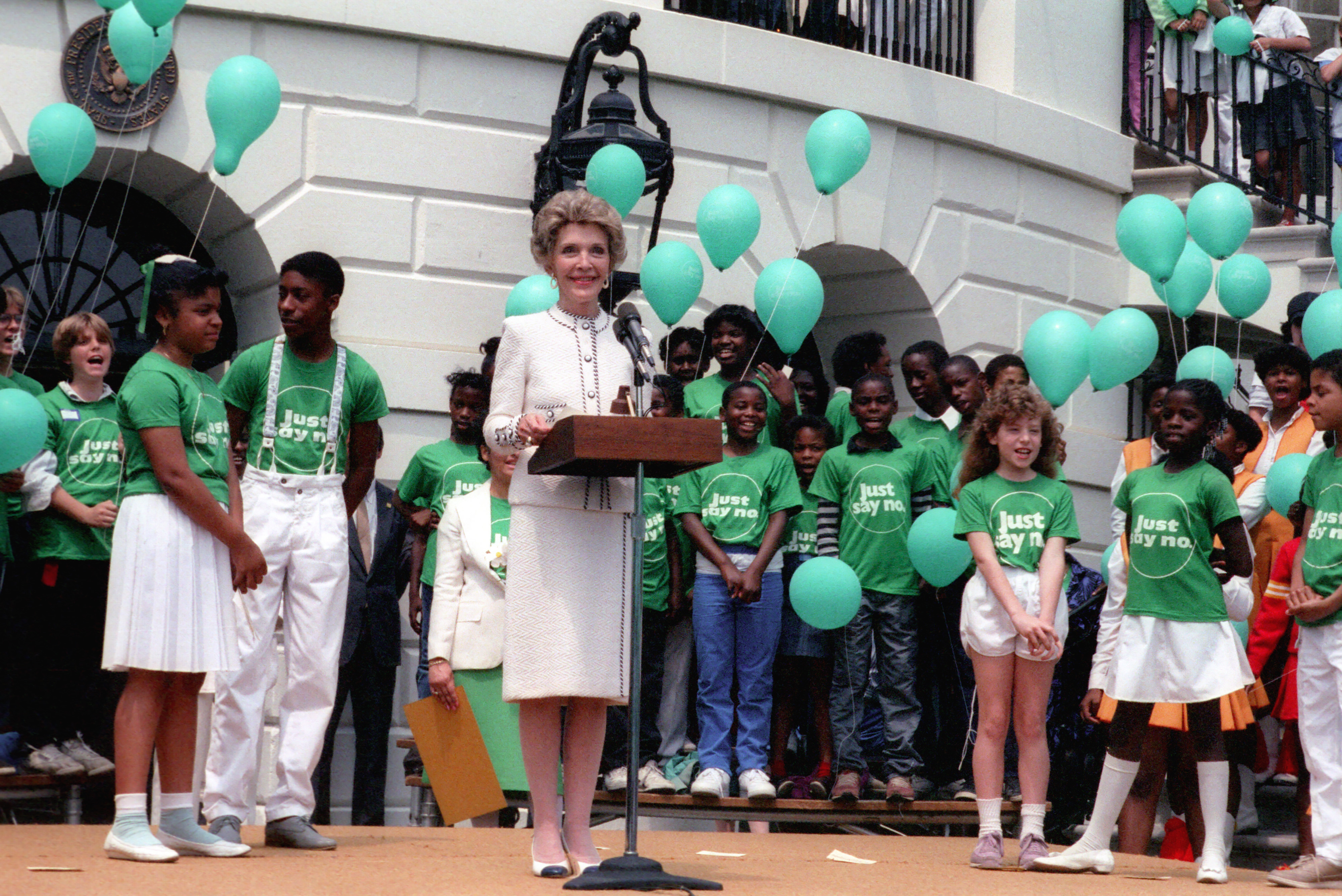
Nancy Reagan at a "Just Say No" rally at the White House in May 1986

Address to the Nation on Drug Abuse Campaign on September 14, 1986

When asked about her efforts in the campaign, Nancy Reagan said: "If you can save just one child, it's worth it." She traveled throughout the United States and several other nations, totaling over 250,000 miles (400,000 km). Nancy Reagan visited drug rehabilitation centers and abuse prevention programs. With the media attention that the first lady received, she appeared on television talk shows, recorded public service announcements, and wrote guest articles. By the autumn of 1985, she had appeared on 23 talk shows, co-hosted an October 1983 episode of Good Morning America, and starred in a two-hour PBS documentary on drug abuse.

The campaign and the phrase "Just Say No" made their way into popular American culture when television series such as Diff'rent Strokes and Punky Brewster produced episodes centered on the campaign. In 1983, Nancy Reagan appeared as herself on Diff'rent Strokes to garner support for the anti-drug campaign. She participated in a 1985 rock music video "Stop the Madness" as well. She even appeared in numerous public service announcements, including one which aired in movie theaters where she appeared alongside actor Clint Eastwood. La Toya Jackson became spokesperson for the campaign in 1987 and recorded a song titled "Just Say No" with British hit producers Stock/Aitken/Waterman.

In 1985, Nancy Reagan expanded the campaign internationally. She invited the First Ladies of 30 nations to the White House in Washington, DC, for a conference entitled the "First Ladies Conference on Drug Abuse". She later became the first First Lady invited to address the United Nations.

She enlisted the help of the Girl Scouts of the United States of America, Kiwanis Club International, and the National Federation of Parents for a Drug-Free Youth to promote the cause; the Kiwanis put up over 2000 billboards with Nancy Reagan's likeness and the slogan. Over 5000 Just Say No clubs were founded in schools and youth organizations in the United States and abroad. Many clubs and organizations remain in operation around the country, where they aim to educate children and teenagers about the effects of drugs.

Just Say No crossed over to the United Kingdom in the 1980s, where it was popularized by the BBC's 1986 "Drugwatch" campaign, which revolved around a heroin-addiction storyline in the popular children's TV drama serial Grange Hill. The cast's cover of the original US campaign song, with an added rap, reached the UK top ten. The death of Anna Wood in Sydney, Australia and British teen Leah Betts from Essex in the mid-1990s sparked a media firestorm across both the UK and Australia over the use of illegal drugs. Wood's parents even released her school photograph on a badge with the saying "Just say no to drugs" placed on it to warn society on the dangers of illicit drug use. The photograph was widely circulated in the media. A photo of Betts in a coma in her hospital bed was also circulated in British media. Both teenagers died due to water intoxication as they drank too much water after ingesting ecstasy.

Advocates of Just Say No in 1984.

== Effects ==
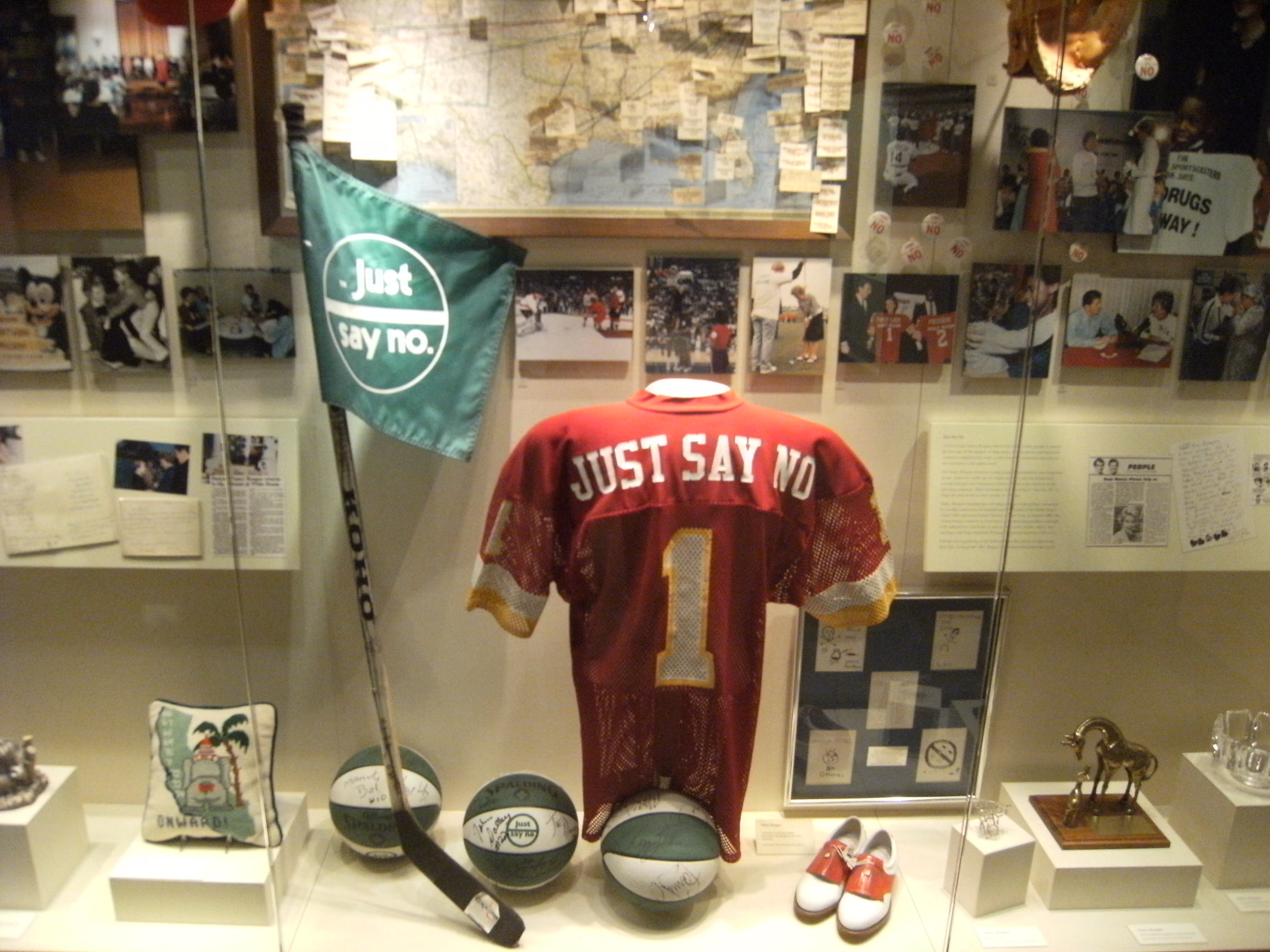
"Just Say No" memorabilia at the Ronald Reagan Presidential Library in 2008

Nancy Reagan's related efforts increased public awareness of drug use, but extant research has not established a direct relationship between the Just Say No campaign and reduced drug use. Although the use and abuse of illegal recreational drugs significantly declined during the Reagan presidency, this may be a spurious correlation: a 2009 analysis of 20 controlled studies on enrollment in one of the most popular "Just Say No" programs, DARE, showed no impact on drug use.

The campaign drew significant criticism. Critics labelled Nancy Reagan's approach to promoting drug awareness reductive, arguing that tackling the issue of drug abuse required a more complex approach than simply encouraging the use of a catchphrase. In fact, two studies suggested that enrollees in DARE-like programs were actually more likely to use alcohol and cigarettes. Journalist Michael McGrath suggested that inflamed fears from "Just Say No" exacerbated mass incarceration and prevented youth from receiving accurate information about dealing with drug abuse and responsible drug use. Critics also think that "Just Say No" contributed towards the well seasoned stigma about people who use drugs being labelled as "bad", and the stigma toward those people who are addicted to drugs being labelled as making a cognizant immoral choice to engage in drug use. In a 1992 paper, Evans et al. commented that the "Just Say No" approach had been "taken out of context and redirected in form as a formula for preventing all substance abuse. ... Because of the current pervasiveness of the catchphrase, we emphasize that ‘Just Say No’ is not enough!" 1990s anti-drug PSA The Long Way Home also notably challenged the effectiveness of the "just say no" message by suggesting that those who promoted the message tended to show neglect to more disadvantaged neighborhoods and how some community drug dealers in fact "don't take no for an answer."

In 2020, when scholars and historians were asked during the Siena College Research Institute's first ladies study to assess the signature initiatives of the then most-recent ten first ladies (those from Lady Bird Johnson onward), "Just Say No" was ranked as the second-worst, with only Melania Trump's "Be Best" campaign being more lowly assessed.

== See also ==
- Above the Influence
- Drug Abuse Resistance Education
- Drug education
- Stop the Madness
- Virginity pledge
- Winners Don't Use Drugs
