= Kentucky Wing Civil Air Patrol =

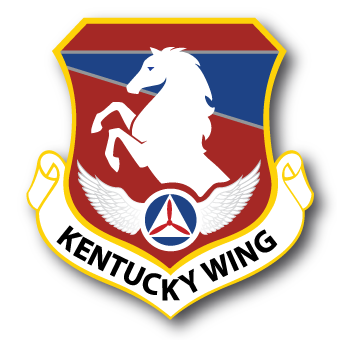
- Kentucky Wing of Civil Air Patrol

Associated branches
- United States Air Force

Command staff
- Commander: Col Jaimie Henson
- Deputy Commander: Lt Col Stephen Warrick
- Chief of Staff: Lt Col Wilson Polidura

Current statistics
- Cadets: 333
- Seniors: 418
- Total Membership: 751
- Website: kywg.cap.gov
- Statistics as of 2025

The Kentucky Wing of Civil Air Patrol (CAP) is the highest echelon of Civil Air Patrol in the state of Kentucky and is a part of CAP's Great Lakes Region. The Kentucky Wing headquarters is located in Frankfort. The Kentucky Wing consists of over 600 cadet and adult members at 17 locations across the state of Kentucky.

== Mission ==
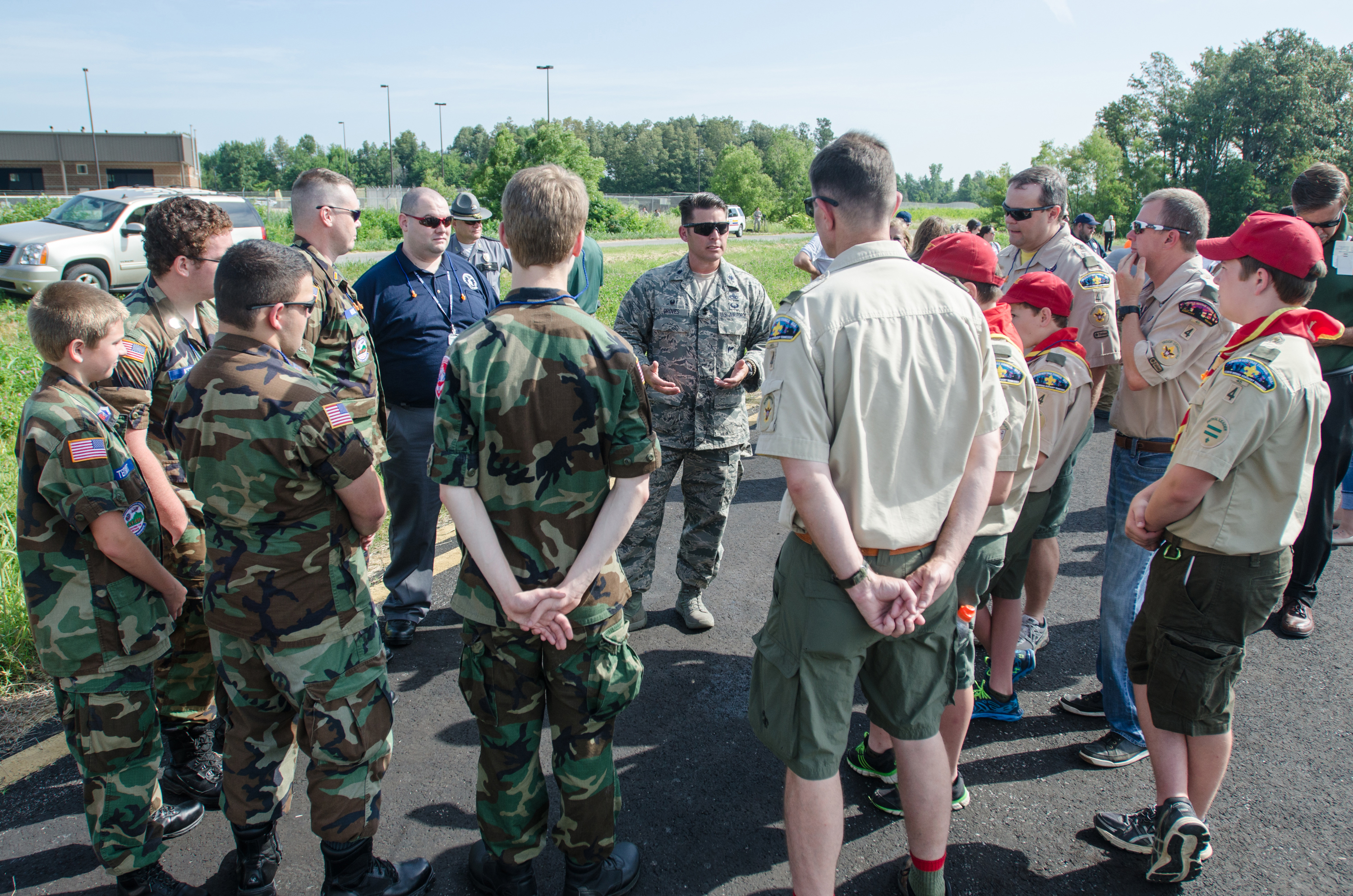
Lt. Col. Ash Groves briefs members of Civil Air Patrol Paducah Composite Squadron and Boy Scout Troop 4.

The Kentucky Wing performs the three primary missions of Civil Air Patrol: providing emergency services; providing a cadet program for youth; and offering aerospace education for both CAP members and the general public.

=== Emergency services ===
Providing emergency services includes performing search and rescue and disaster relief missions; as well as assisting in humanitarian aid assignments. The CAP also provides Air Force support through conducting light transport, communications support, and low-altitude route surveys. Civil Air Patrol can also offer support to counter-drug missions.

In January 2009, members of the Kentucky Wing, along with CAP members from the Indiana, Illinois, and Ohio Wings, flew sorties surveying damage and boosting communications for the Kentucky National Guard following a severe ice storm, while CAP ground crews assisted National Guardsmen in going door to door to perform wellness checks on residents.

In April 2015, members of the Kentucky Wing were called to assist the Red Cross to help with victims of flooding that occurred in Louisville, Kentucky. In that same month, they supported the Red Cross for 3 days until their assistance was no longer needed.

From August to September 2021, Kentucky wing cadets and senior members assisted in a national effort to review disaster relief imagery from the aftermath of Hurricane Ida, reviewing hundreds of images and tagging countless structures with their apparent damage level to help determine what areas most critically needed relief efforts focused towards them.

It may also be noted that members of the Kentucky Wing have been requested by the Governor on several occasions to take surveillance photographs of numerous areas stricken with disasters. These photographs have assisted not only members of the Ground Teams of the Kentucky Wing, but also several other disaster relief teams in knowing where to go first.

=== Cadet programs ===
Civil Air Patrol offers cadet programs for youth aged 12 to 21. Cadets receive training in aerospace education, leadership training, physical fitness and moral leadership.

=== Encampment ===
Kentucky Wing holds a cadet encampment annually. Serving as a weeklong training camp for cadets, the encampment involves instruction in discipline, teamwork, and leadership. Other activities involve instruction in drill and ceremonies, customs and courtesies, basic CAP knowledge and military tradition. Encampment attendance is a prerequisite for the Gen. Billy Mitchell Award. Senior members may also be awarded the ribbon for providing leadership at CAP this encampment. The most recent encampments have been hosted at the Wendell H. Ford Regional Training Center near Greenville, Kentucky.

=== Aerospace education ===
Civil Air Patrol offers aerospace education for CAP members and the general public; this includes offering training to the members of the CAP, and facilitating teaching workshops for youth through schools and public aviation events.

== Organization ==
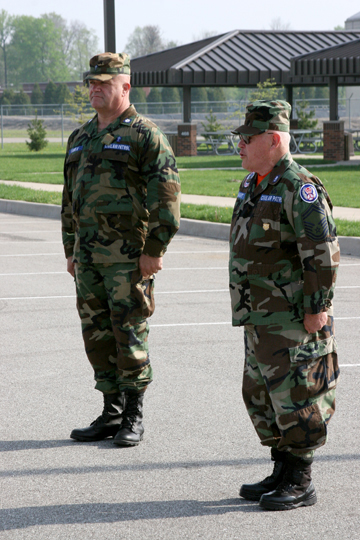
Senior Master Sgt. Les Hart, a moral leadership officer and drill instructor from the 202nd Civil Air Patrol Squadron, Bedford County, Kentucky, orders attendees to attention.

Squadrons of the Kentucky Wing
Designation	Squadron Name	Location	Notes
GLR-KY-001	Kentucky Wing Headquarters	Frankfort	
GLR-KY-011	Paducah Composite Squadron	Paducah	
GLR-KY-039	Louisville Composite Squadron	Crestwood	
GLR-KY-050	Boone County Composite Squadron	Walton	GLR-KY-050 Official Website
GLR-KY-057	Bowling Green Senior Squadron	Bowling Green	
GLR-KY-058	Frankfort Composite Squadron	Frankfort	
GLR-KY-073	Northern Kentucky Composite Squadron	Newport	
GLR-KY-122	Stuart Powell Cadet Squadron	Danville	
GLR-KY-131	Heartland Composite Squadron	Elizabethtown	
GLR-KY-214	Bowman Field Senior Squadron	Louisville	
GLR-KY-216	Fort Campbell Composite Squadron	Clarksville	
GLR-KY-221	Blue Grass Senior Squadron	Lexington	
GLR-KY-222	Van Meter Cadet Squadron	Lexington	
GLR-KY-223	Owensboro Composite Squadron	Owensboro	
GLR-KY-225	Elkhorn Cadet Squadron	Georgetown	
GLR-KY-300	Southern Kentucky Cadet Squadron	Bowling Green	
GLR-KY-357	Lake Cumberland Cadet Squadron	Somerset	
GLR-KY-802	Fleming County High School Covered Bridge Cadet Squadron	Flemingsburg	
GLR-KY-999	Kentucky Legislative Squadron	Frankfort	

Former Squadrons of the Kentucky Wing
Designation	Squadron Name	Location	Notes
GLR-KY-123	Kentucky ANG Composite Squadron	Louisville	Inactive c. 2023

== Kentucky Civil Air Patrol Wing Commanders ==
Commander's Name	Rank	Period of Command Service
Albert Henry Near	Colonel	1941–1942
Carl W. Ulrich	Major	1942
Charles H. Gartrell	Major	1942–1943
Howard B. Brown	Captain	1943
William S. Rinehart	Colonel	1943–1946
Charles E. Hall	Colonel	1946–1949
John B. Wathen III	Colonel	1949–1953
Francis A. Blevins	Colonel	1953–1957
Houston H. Doyle	Colonel	1957–1958
Carlos O. Puckett	Colonel	1958–1959
James A. Denham	Colonel	1959–1961
Francis A. Blevins	Colonel	1961–1965
George B. Carter	Colonel	1965–1969
Richard R. Dooley	Colonel	1969–1971
Charles E. Lynn Jr.	Colonel	1971–1972
John F. Price	Colonel	1972–1976
William R. Ritter	Colonel	1976–1977
Herman H. Bishop	Colonel	1977–1980
Nathaniel L. Tucker	Colonel	1980–1982
George M. Hudson	Colonel	1982–1986
William K. Hughes	Colonel	1986–1991
Denzil Allen	Colonel	1991–1994
Douglas N. Huff	Colonel	1994–1997
Jimmie W. Cantrell	Colonel	1997–1998
Michael A. Cooper	Colonel	1998–1999
John F. Price	Colonel	1999–2000
Loretta L. Holbrook	Colonel	2000–2004
Henry L. Heaberlin	Colonel	2004–2009
Robert J. Koob	Colonel	2009–2013
James F. Huggins	Colonel	2013–2016
David A. Kantor	Colonel	2016–2017
Darrel D. Williamson	Colonel	2017–2021
Brian W. Schmuck	Colonel	2021–2024
Jaimie Henson	Colonel	2024 - present

== See also ==
- Kentucky Active Militia
- Kentucky Air National Guard
- Kentucky Army National Guard
- United States Coast Guard Auxiliary
