= Ohio Wing Civil Air Patrol =

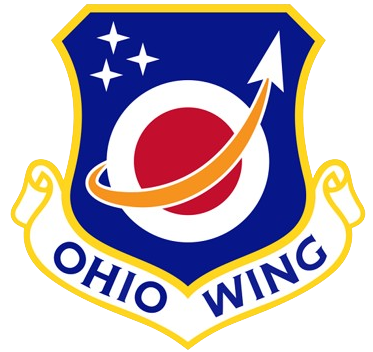
- Ohio Wing of Civil Air Patrol

Associated branches
- United States Air Force

Command staff
- Commander: Col David A. "DAD" Dlugiewicz
- Deputy Commander: Maj Eric J. Coggin
- Chief of Staff: Lt Col Scott Glenn

Current statistics
- Cadets: 786
- Seniors: 597
- Total Membership: 1,383
- Website: ohwg.cap.gov
- Statistics as of 20 March 2026

The Ohio Wing (OHWG) of the Civil Air Patrol (CAP) is the highest echelon of CAP in the state of Ohio. The Ohio Wing headquarters are located in Columbus at the Defense Supply Center, Columbus. The wing is a member of the Great Lakes Region of the CAP.

== History ==
The Ohio Wing's foundation corresponds with the late 1930s movement to organize civilian aviation for domestic defense. In 1940 in Toledo, Milton Knight organized a Civil Air Reserve unit. After taking office in 1939, Governor John W. Bricker appointed Cleveland resident Earle L. Johnson as Director of the Ohio Bureau of Aeronautics. A graduate of the Ohio State University, Johnson's interest in aviation began in the mid-1920s thanks to his neighbor and Cleveland native David Ingalls, the only United States Navy fighter ace from World War I. While working for Governor Bricker, Johnson in September 1941 organized Ohio's civilian pilots into a state Civil Air Defense wing. When the federal Office of Civilian Defense (OCD) established the Civil Air Patrol in December 1941, the state Civil Air Defense wing evolved into a CAP wing, with Johnson serving as the first wing commander. In March 1942, Johnson entered active army service and succeeded Major General John F. Curry as the national commander of the CAP, a position he held until his death in 1947.

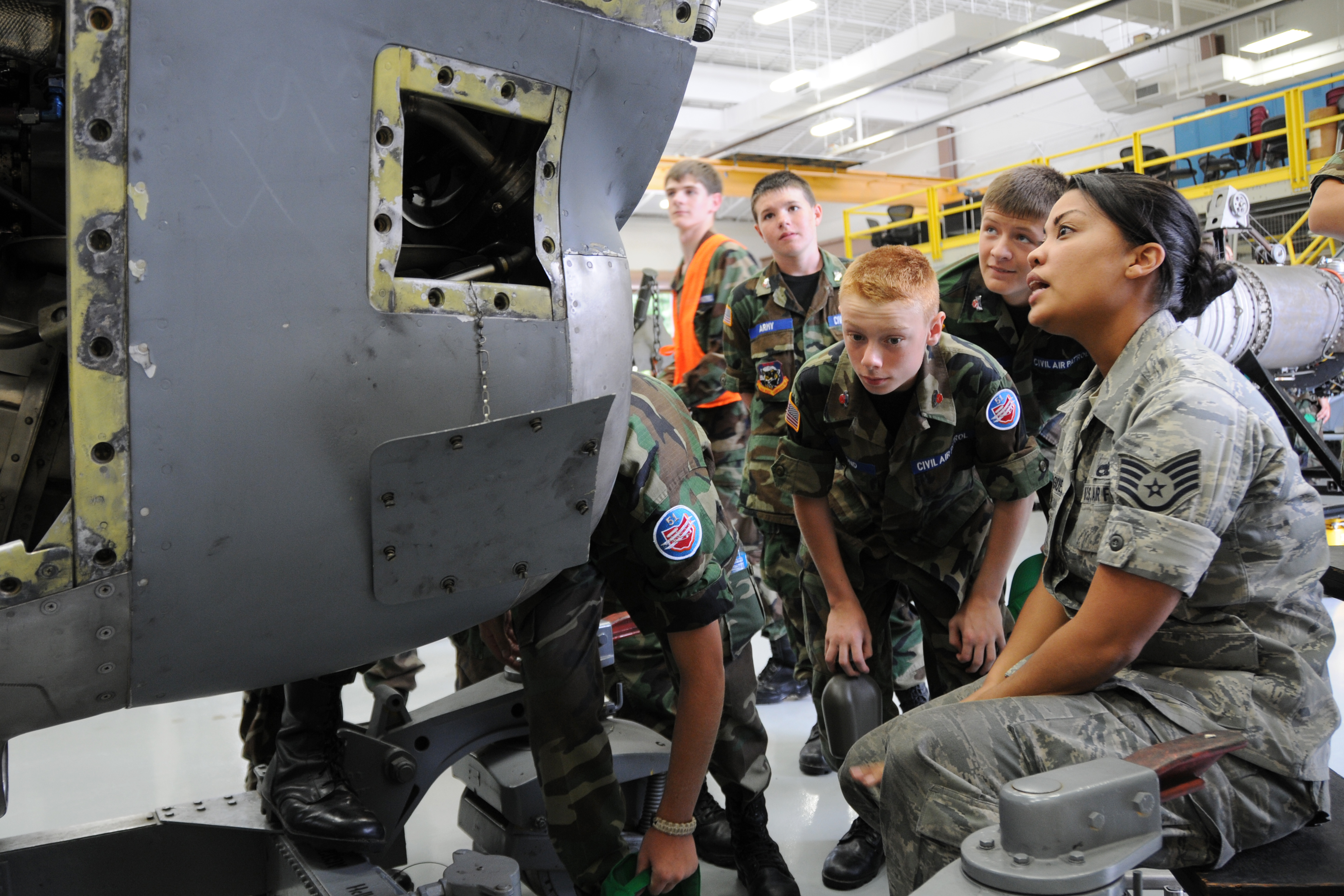
Cadets of the wing being shown a Lockheed C-130 Hercules intake

The Ohio Wing grew rapidly following the onset of the war. Governor Bricker joined CAP in May 1942, as did Congressman John M. Vorys, himself a World War I naval aviator and former director of the Ohio Bureau of Aeronautics. By July 1942, the wing numbered 3,282 men and women organized in nine groups and 39 squadrons, making the Ohio Wing the third largest CAP wing in the nation; over 4,200 members served in the Ohio Wing by 31 October 1942. Ohio squadrons undertook a variety of missions on behalf of the war effort, including searches for scrap metal, aerial patrol over the state's valuable timber resources, preventing large forest fires from erupting, surveillance of coal, oil, and gas resources, patrolling flood-stricken areas across the state, and served as aerial couriers during the war.

Ohio, far removed from the U-boat menace, resolved to contribute to the coastal patrol effort. In July 1942, Vorys made an open request for volunteers to help form an all-Ohio CAP Coastal Patrol base, which was authorized on July 16, 1942, by the activation of Coastal Patrol Base No. 14 at Panama City, Florida. Aircrews spotted oil slicks, debris, reported suspected U-boats, remains of crashed aircraft, and anything out of the ordinary. They assisted in the rescue of shipwreck survivors, reported sinking or suspicious vessels to the military, and ensured that the valuable tankers and supply vessels leaving ports in the Gulf made their way safely to military forces in Europe and the Pacific.

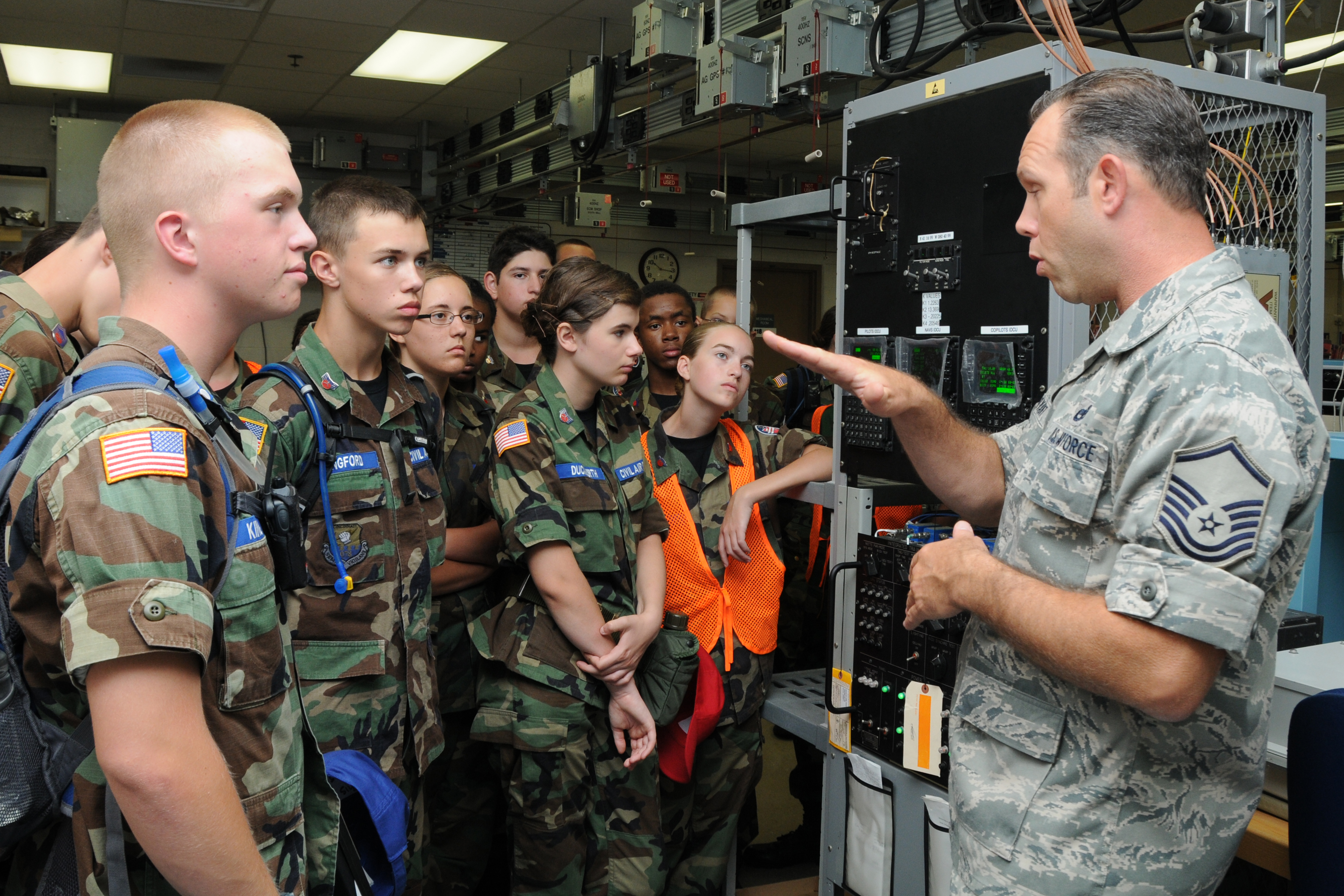
Air Force Reserve Master Sgt. Dan Bryant, a communication and navigation systems craftsman with the 910th Maintenance Squadron, explains the components of avionics equipment to Ohio Civil Air Patrol cadets.

Since World War II, the Ohio Wing has continued to prosper, developing scores of young men and women into model citizens and future personnel in the armed forces. Wing members have rescued downed aviators, assisted state and national officials during natural disasters and local emergencies and represented the "Birthplace of Aviation" by promoting Ohio's aviation heritage and resources.

In January 2009, members of the Ohio Wing, along with CAP members from the Indiana, Illinois, and Kentucky Wings, flew sorties surveying damage and boosting communications for the Kentucky National Guard following a severe ice storm in Kentucky, while CAP ground crews assisted National Guardsmen in going door to door to perform wellness checks on residents.

== Annual encampment ==
The Ohio Wing holds a cadet encampment annually. Serving as a weeklong training camp for cadets, the encampment involves instruction in discipline, teamwork, and leadership. Other activities involve instruction in drill and ceremonies, customs and courtesies, basic CAP knowledge and military tradition. Encampment attendance is a prerequisite for the Gen. Billy Mitchell Award. Senior members may also be awarded the ribbon for providing leadership at CAP this encampment. The encampment has been held in several locations over the years, including but not limited to: Wright-Patterson Air Force Base, in Dayton, Ohio, Athletes in Action sports complex, in Xenia, Ohio, Camp James A. Garfield, in Newton Falls, Ohio, and most recently, Wright State University, in Fairborn, Ohio.

== Groups and squadrons ==
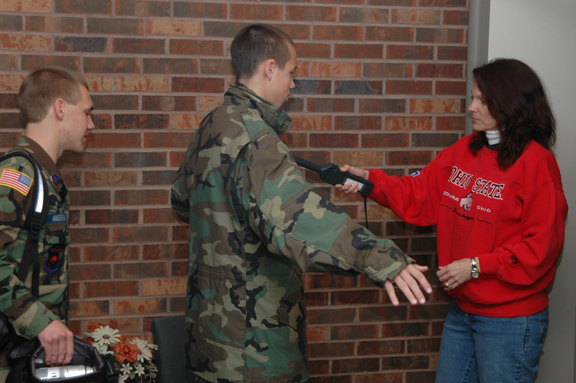
Base Operations personnel at Grissom Reserve Air Base screen Ohio Civil Air Patrol cadets prior to an orientation flight on a 434th Air Refueling Wing KC-135R Stratotanker.

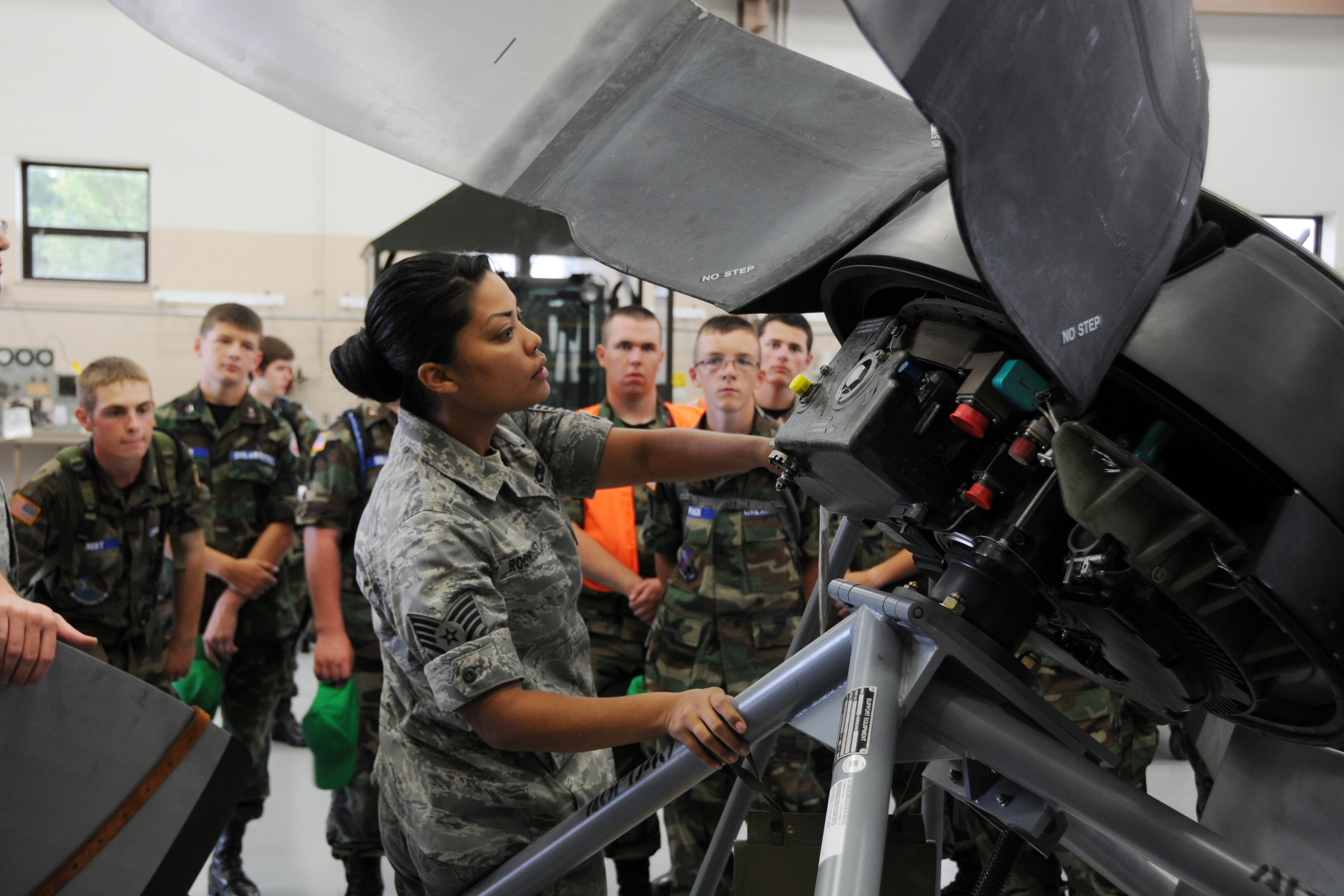
Air Force Reserve Staff Sgt. Jenelle Rodriguez, an aerospace propulsion journeyman with the 910th Maintenance Squadron, explains the functioning of a C-130H Hercules propeller to Ohio Civil Air Patrol cadets.

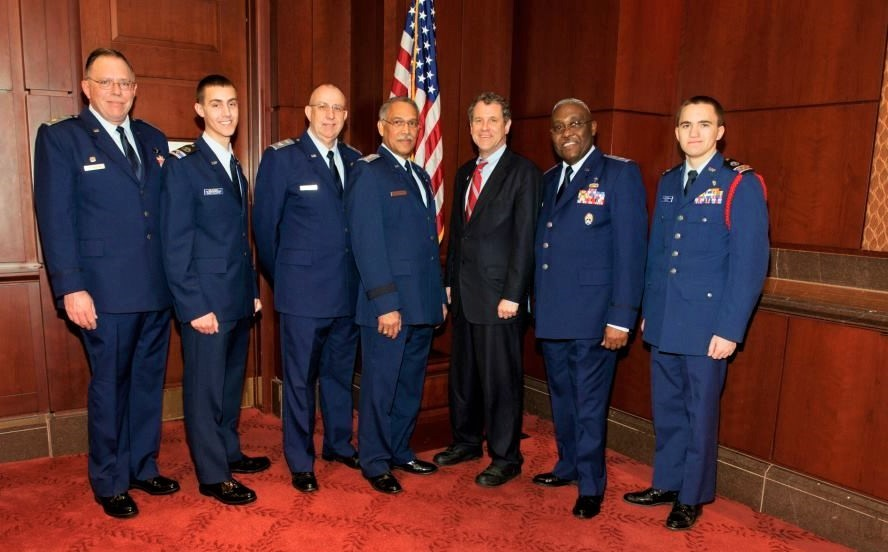
A delegation from the Ohio Wing Civil Air Patrol meets with Ohio Senator Sherrod Brown.

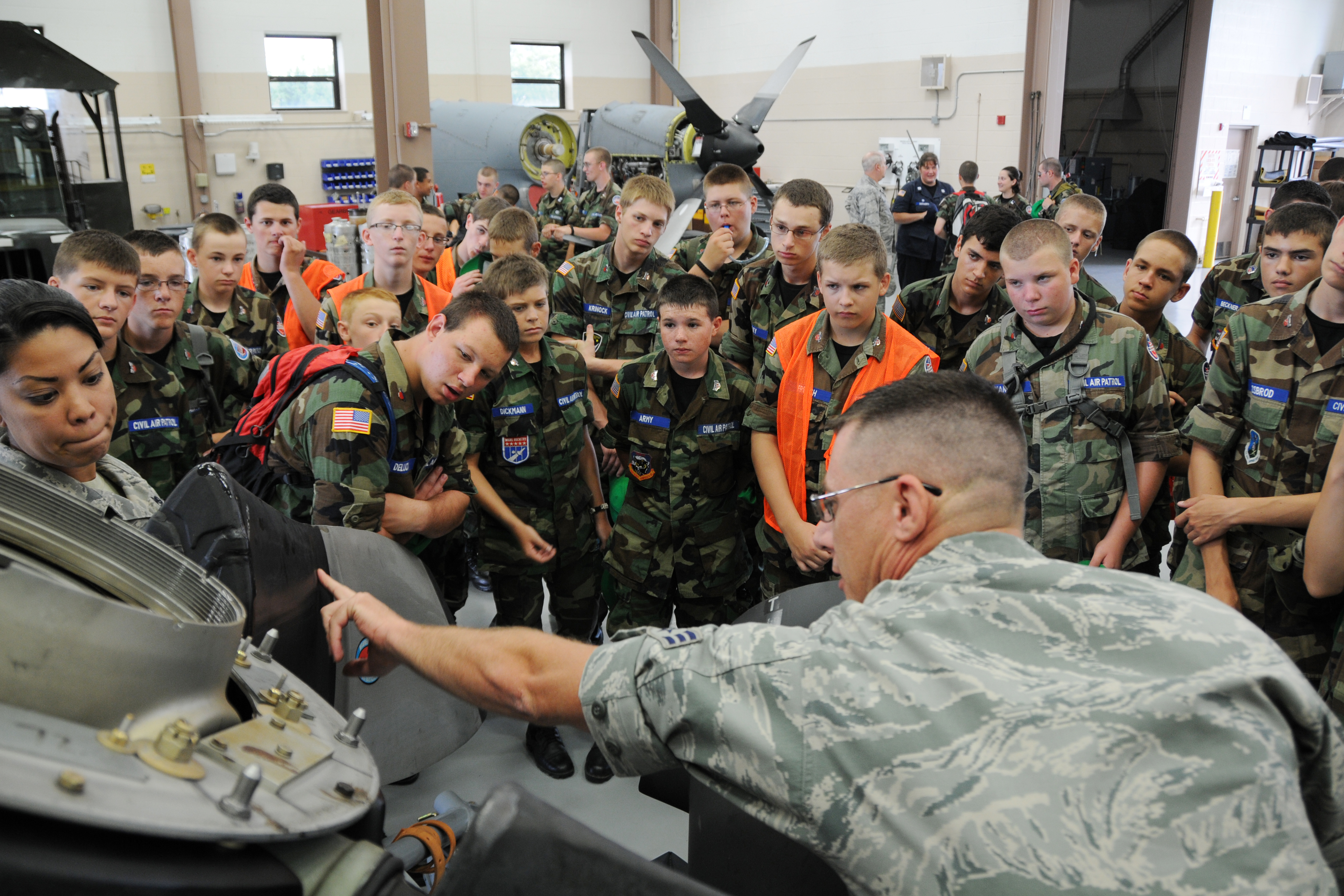
Air Force Reserve SrA Jerry Winkler, an aerospace propulsion helper with the 910th Maintenance Squadron, explain the functioning of a C-130H Hercules propeller to Civil Air Patrol cadets.

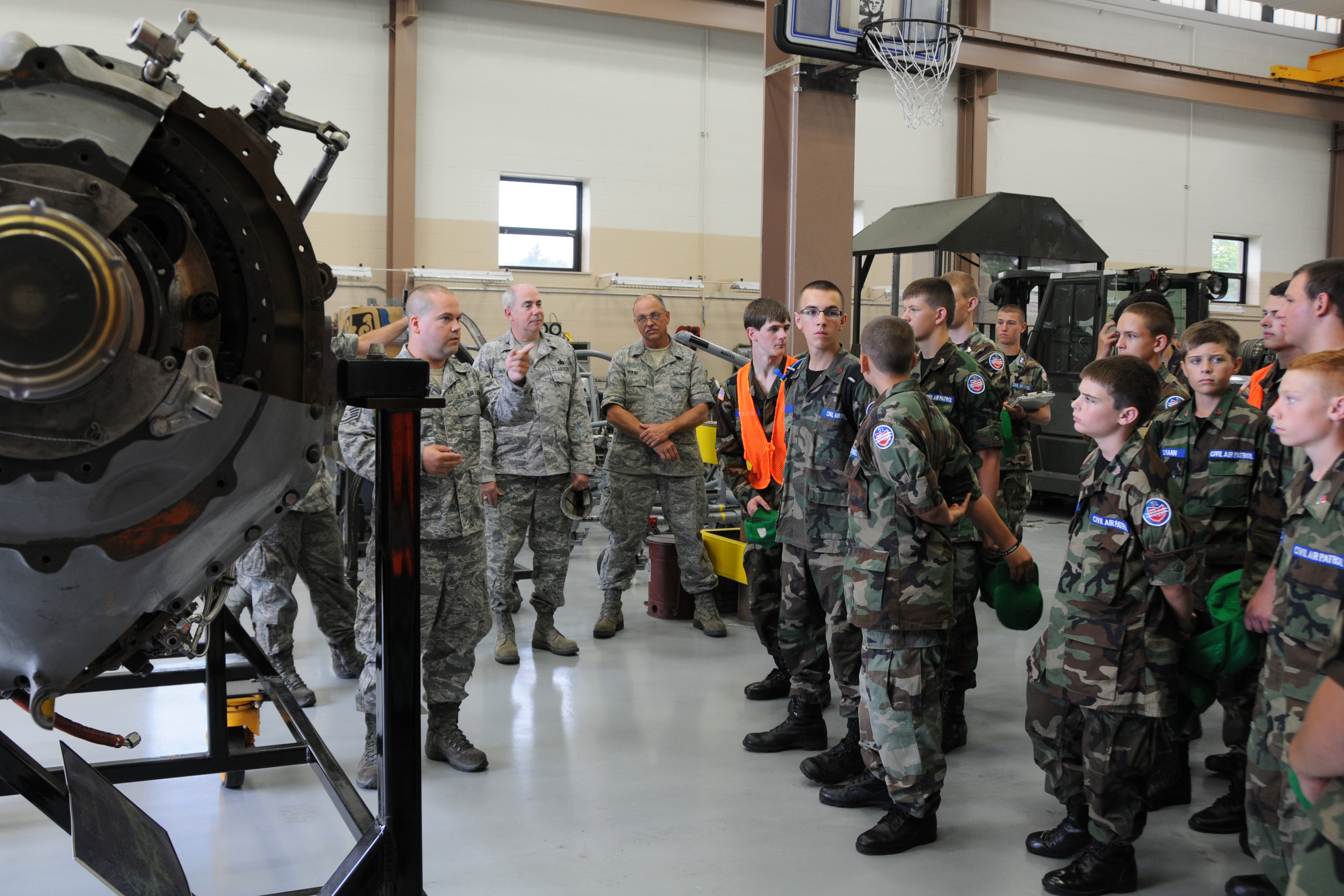
Air Force Reserve Staff Sgt. Derek Pressell, an aerospace propulsion technician, with the 910th Maintenance Squadron explains the components of a C-130H Hercules aircraft cut away engine to Ohio Civil Air Patrol cadets.

Groups and squadrons of the Ohio Wing
Group	Number	Squadron name	Location
Wing Headquarters	GLR-OH-001	Ohio Wing Headquarters	Columbus
	GLR-OH-000	Ohio Reserve Squadron	Columbus
	GLR-OH-999	Ohio Wing Legislative Squadron	Columbus
Southwest Group	GLR-OH-044	Southwest Headquarters	Blue Ash
	GLR-OH-037	Wright-Patterson Composite Squadron	Wright-Patterson AFB
	GLR-OH-078	Lunken Cadet Squadron	Cincinnati
	GLR-OH-114	Don Gentile Composite Squadron 709	Piqua
	GLR-OH-145	Lt Col Jerome P. Ashman Composite Squadron	Maineville
	GLR-OH-178	Springfield ANGB Composite Squadron	Springfield
	GLR-OH-197	Dayton Aero Cadet Squadron 706	Troy
	GLR-OH-244	Lt Col James R. Sanders Senior Squadron	Blue Ash
	GLR-OH-279	Clermont County Composite Squadron	Batavia
	GLR-OH-284	Wright Brothers Composite Squadron	Miamisburg
	GLR-OH-288	Pathfinder Cadet Squadron	Middletown
Northeast Group	GLR-OH-058	Northeast Headquarters	Cleveland
	GLR-OH-003	Lorain County Composite Squadron	Elyria
	GLR-OH-051	Youngstown ARS Composite Squadron	Vienna
	GLR-OH-096	96th Composite Squadron	Stow
	GLR-OH-131	Cuyahoga County Cadet Squadron	Brecksville
	GLR-OH-219	Median County Skyhawks Composite Squadron	Wadsworth
	GLR-OH-236	Lakefront Senior Squadron	Cleveland
	GLR-OH-252	Frank H. Kettlewood Composite Squadron	Painesville
	GLR-OH-275	Akron-Canton Senior Flying Squadron	Green
	GLR-OH-278	Akron-Canton Composite Squadron	North Canton
Northwest Group	GLR-OH-064	Northwest Headquarters	Bowling Green
	GLR-OH-016	Toledo ANGB Composite Squadron	Swanton
	GLR-OH-018	Wood County Senior Squadron	Bowling Green
	GLR-OH-177	Mansfield 177th Squadron	Mansfield
	GLR-OH-298	Flag City Composite Squadron	Findlay
	GLR-OH-802	Galion City Schools Cadet Squadron	Galion
Southeast Group	GLR-OH-291	Southeast Headquarters	Columbus
	GLR-OH-085	Columbus Senior Squadron	Columbus
	GLR-OH-121	Rickenbacker ANGB Composite Squadron	South of Columbus
	GLR-OH-139	Columbus Composite Squadron	Worthington
	GLR-OH-157	Licking County Composite Squadron	Newark
	GLR-OH-234	Victor A. Hammond Composite Squadron	Marysville
	GLR-OH-299	Knox County Airport Cadet Flight	Mt Vernon

Former Groups and Squadrons of the Ohio Wing
Group	Number	Squadron name	Location
Group I	GLR-OH-156	Warren County Cadet Squadron	Lebanon
Group II	GLR-OH-293	Headquarters Group II	Columbus
Group IV	GLR-OH-004	Eagle Composite Squadron	Beachwood
Group V	GLR-OH-292	Headquarters Group V	Cleveland
Group VI	GLR-OH-801	Sandusky High School Cadet Squadron	Sandusky
Group VII	GLR-OH-070	Ross P. Barrett Composite Squadron	Springfield
	GLR-OH-227	Xenia Cadet Squadron	Xenia
	GLR-OH-231	Grand Lake Composite Squadron	Celina
	GLR-OH-282	Wright Brothers Composite Squadron	Dayton
	GLR-OH-285	Dayton Senior Squadron	Wright-Patterson AFB
Group VIII	GLR-OH-115	Capt Eddie Rickenbacker Composite Squadron	Columbus
	GLR-OH-210	Rickenbacker ANGB Composite Squadron	Lancaster, Ohio
	GLR-OH-243	Ross County Senior Squadron	Chillicothe

== Wing commanders ==
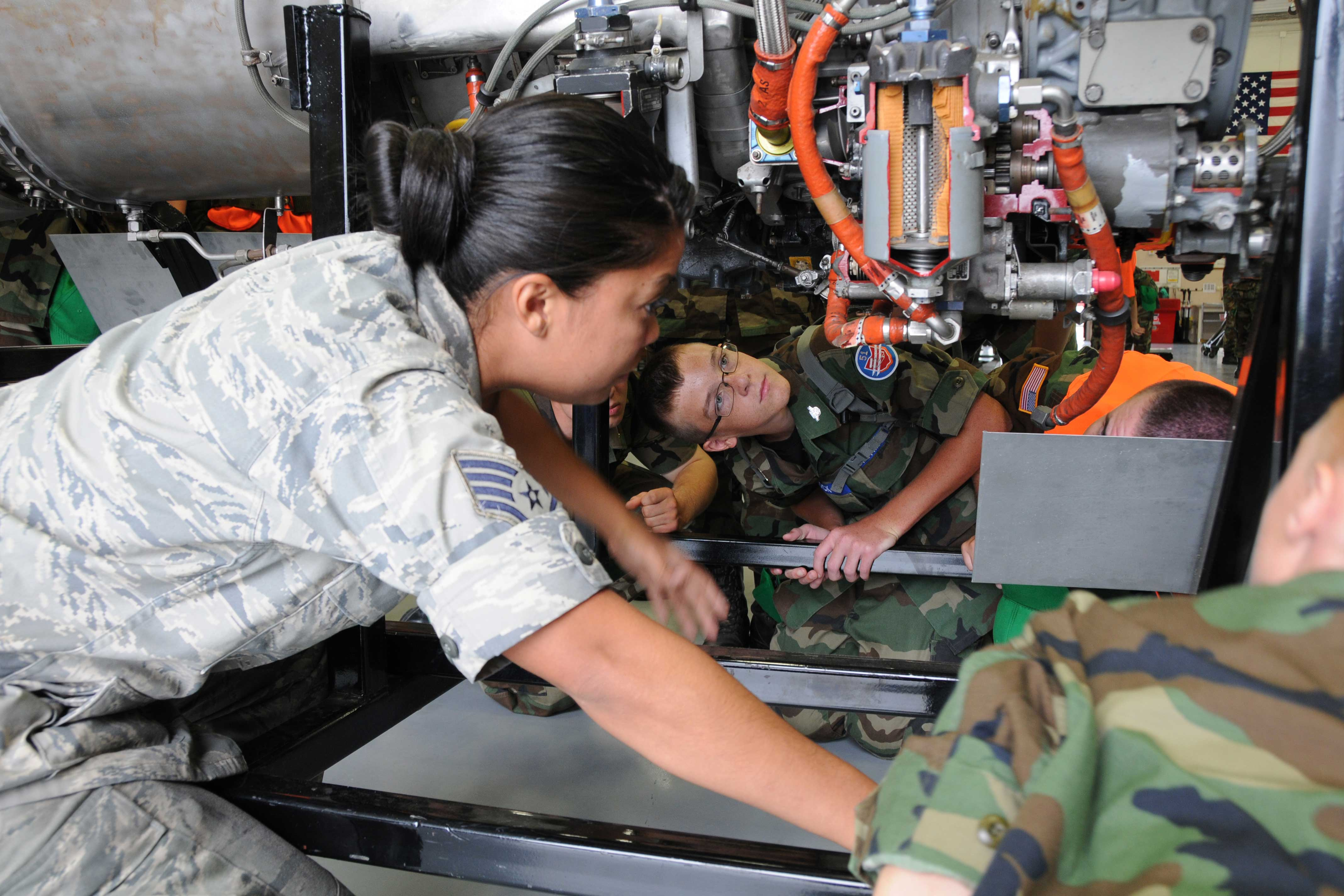
Air Force Reserve Staff Sgt. Jenelle Rodriguez shows the engine room to Ohio Wing Civil Air Patrol cadets.

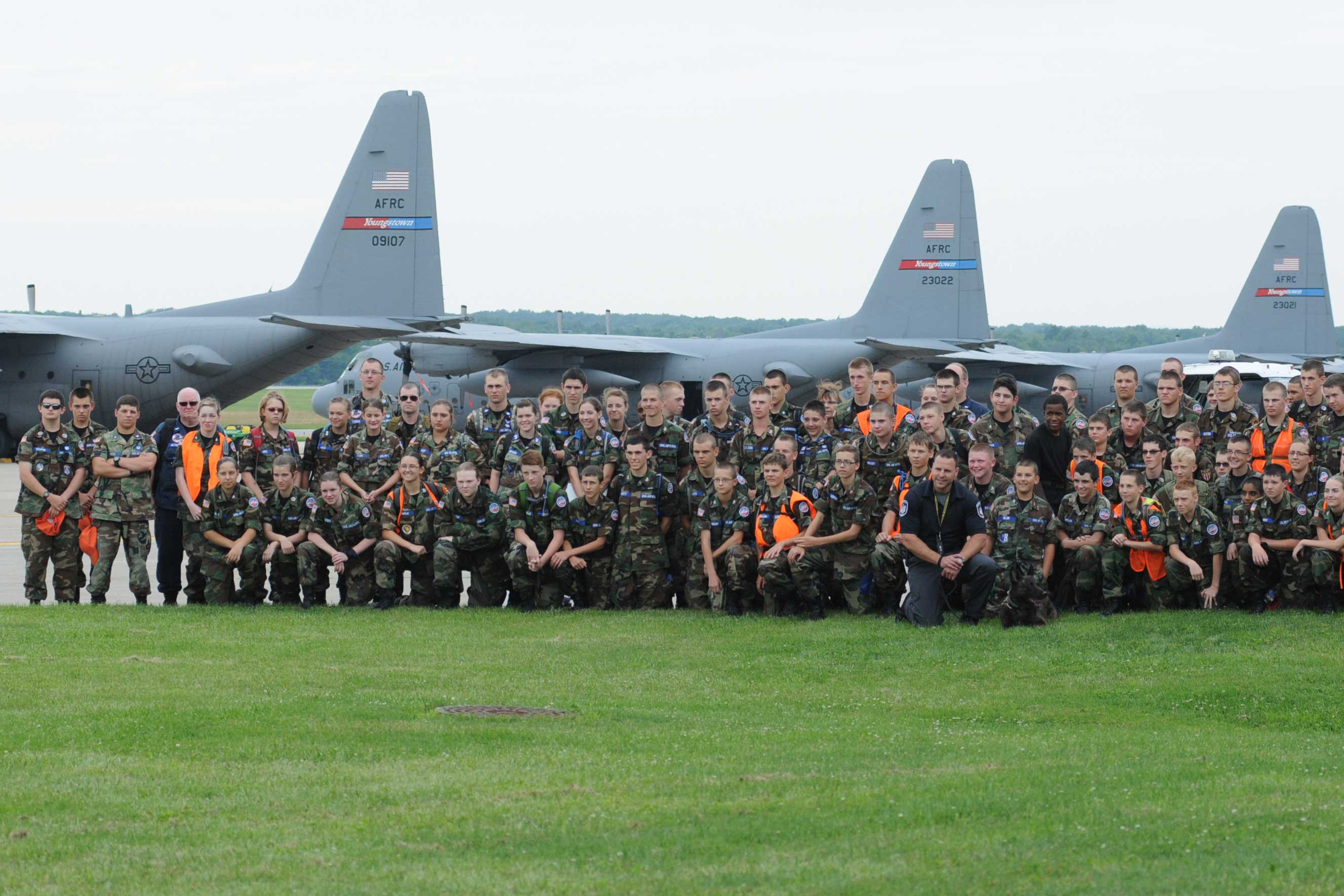
Ohio Wing Civil Air Patrol members during an encampment at Youngstown Air Reserve Station in Ohio.

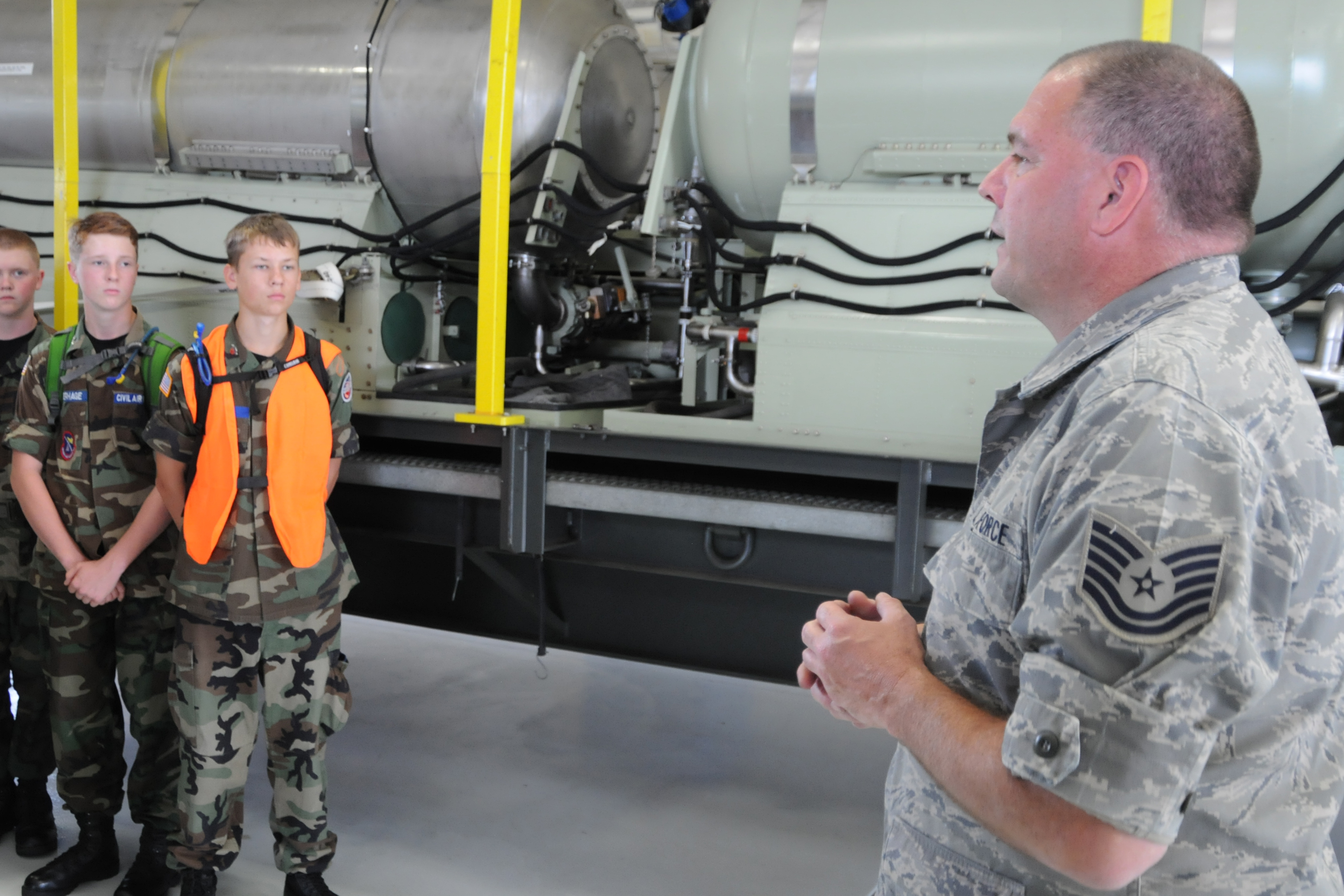
Air Force Reserve Technical Sgt. Mike Lamantia explains the C-130 Modular Aerial Spray System (MASS) to a group of Ohio Civil Air Patrol cadets.

Commanders of the Ohio Wing of the Civil Air Patrol
Commander's name	Period of service
Earle L. Johnson*	December 1, 1941 – April 1, 1942
Col George A. Stone, Jr.	April 7, 1942 – June 1, 1947
Col John R. McGuire	June 1, 1947 – July 17, 1951
Col Edmund P. Lunken	July 17, 1951 – September 23, 1953
Col John O. Swarts	September 23, 1953 – September 14, 1957
Lt Col Lyle W. Castle	September 14, 1957 – August 12, 1960
Col Robert H. Herweh	August 12, 1960 – December 6, 1963
Col William W. Kight	December 6, 1963 – December 8, 1967
Col Patrick R. Sorohan	December 8, 1967 – June 1, 1970
Col Gerald M. Tartaglione	June 1, 1970 – June 1, 1974
Col Leon W. Dillon	June 1, 1974 – January 4, 1978
Col Claude H. Fore, Jr. (interim)	January 4, 1978 – December 1, 1978
Col Marjorie J. Swain	December 1, 1978 – February 20, 1983
Col Loren G. Gillespie	February 20, 1983 – May 6, 1987
Col Larkin C. Durdin	May 6, 1987 – December 31, 1989
Col Leslie S. Bryant	December 31, 1989 – January 1, 1992
Col Carl C. Stophlet, Jr.	January 1, 1992 – October 1, 1994
Col Jacquelyn L. Hartigan	October 1, 1994 – September 19, 1998
Col Robert M. Sponseller	September 19, 1998 – August 4, 1999
Col Michael J. Murrell	August 4, 1999 – September 14, 2003
Col Charles L. Carr, Jr.*	September 14, 2003 – March 1, 2007
Col Dave Winters (interim)	March 1, 2007 – June 6, 2007
Col Dave Winters	June 6, 2007 – June 11, 2011
Col Gregory L. Mathews	June 11, 2011 – June 23, 2013
Col Theodore L. Shaffer	October 13, 2013 – October 14, 2017
Col David J. Jennison	October 14, 2017 – May 28, 2021
Col Peter K. Bowden	May 28, 2021 – April 20, 2024
Col David A. "DAD" Dlugiewicz	April 20, 2024 – Present

* denotes commanders who have gone on to become the national commander of the Civil Air Patrol.

== See also ==
- Ohio Air National Guard
- Ohio Army National Guard
- Ohio Military Reserve
- Ohio Naval Militia
