= Illinois Wing Civil Air Patrol =

- Illinois Wing of Civil Air Patrol

Associated branches
- United States Air Force

Command staff
- Commander: Col Alfredo R. Reynoso
- Deputy Commander: Major Gerald Wirth & Major Velerie Espinili
- Chief of Staff: Major Michael Larson

Current statistics
- Cadets: 571
- Seniors: 539
- Total Membership: 1110
- Website: ilwg.cap.gov
- Statistics as of November 2023

The Illinois Wing of Civil Air Patrol (CAP) is the highest echelon of Civil Air Patrol in the state of Illinois. Illinois Wing Headquarters is located in West Chicago, Illinois. The Illinois Wing consists of over 1,000 cadet and adult members at 25 locations across the state of Illinois. The Illinois Wing provides communities with emergency response, aviation and ground services. "Together we all succeed!"

== Emergency services ==
Civil Air Patrol Air Patrol provides emergency services, which includes search and rescue and disaster relief missions; including providing assistance in humanitarian aid assignments. The CAP provides Air Force support through the conducting of light transport, communications support, and low-altitude route surveys. Civil Air Patrol Air Patrol may assist in counter-drug missions.

In January 2009, members of the Illinois Wing, along with CAP members from the Indiana, Kentucky, and Ohio Wings, flew sorties surveying damage and boosting communications for the Kentucky National Guard following a severe ice storm in Kentucky, while CAP ground crews assisted National Guardsmen in going door to door to perform wellness checks on residents.

== Cadet programs ==
Civil Air Patrol Air Patrol offers a cadet program for youth aged 12 to 18, 21, which is organized as a sixteen step training program which offers aerospace education, leadership training, physical fitness and moral leadership.

== Aerospace education ==
Civil Air Patrol Air Patrol provides aerospace education for both CAP members and the general public; it includes providing training to the members of the CAP, and offering workshops for youth throughout the nation through schools and public aviation events.

== Organization ==
The Illinois Wing of Civil Air Patrol Air Patrol is composed of 26 squadrons which are distributed among six Groups across the state of Illinois. The six Groups of Illinois Wing include: Group 1, covers Southern Illinois; Group 2, South of Chicago; Group 3, Central Illinois; Group 4, Northwest Illinois, Group 5, West Chicago; and Group 6, Chicago Land.

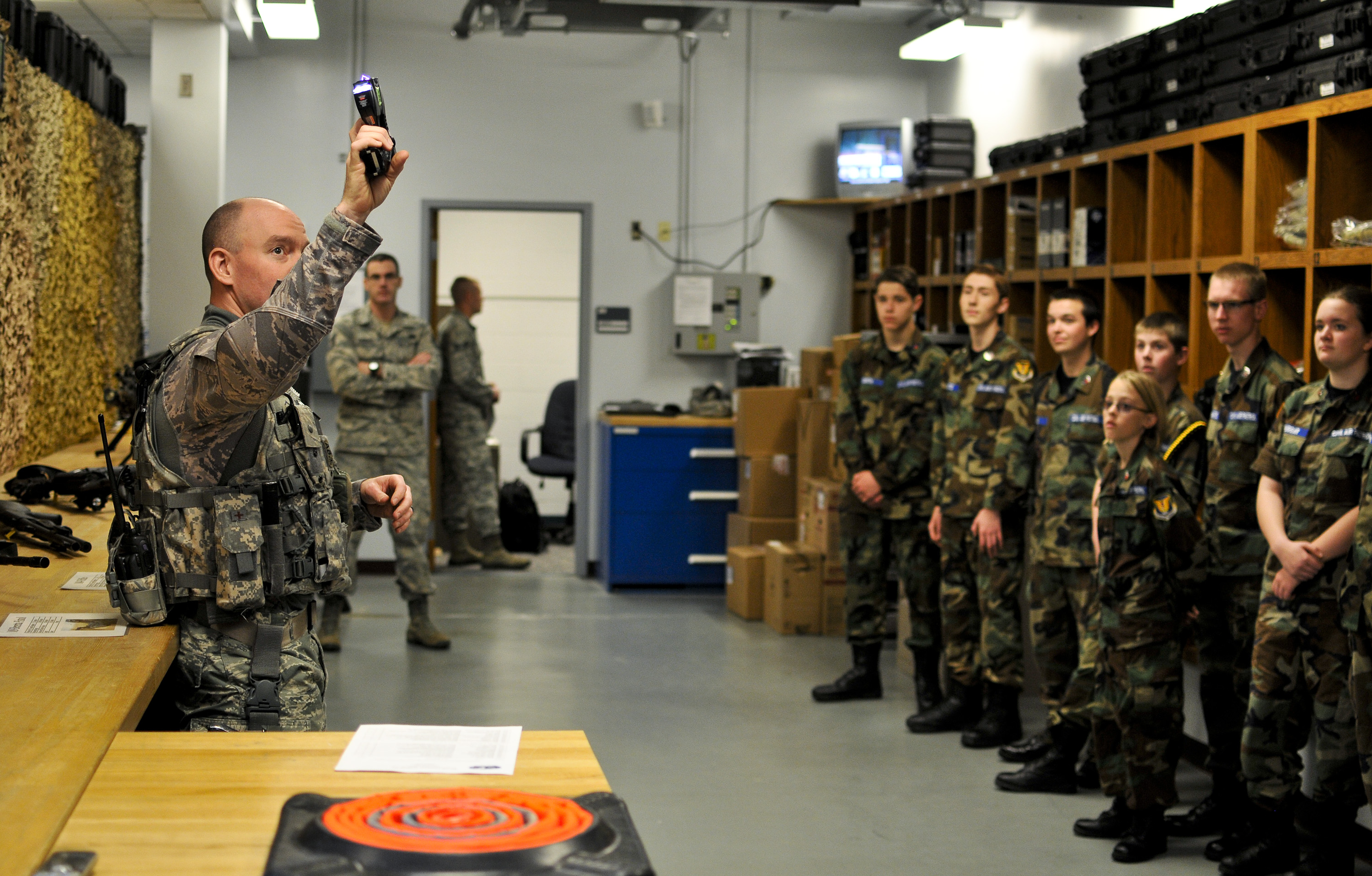
U.S. Air Force Master Sgt. Blake A. Pumphrey, head of mobility and resources at the 182nd Security Forces Squadron, demonstrates a Taser X26 spark test for Civil Air Patrol cadets at the 182nd Airlift Wing in Peoria, Ill.

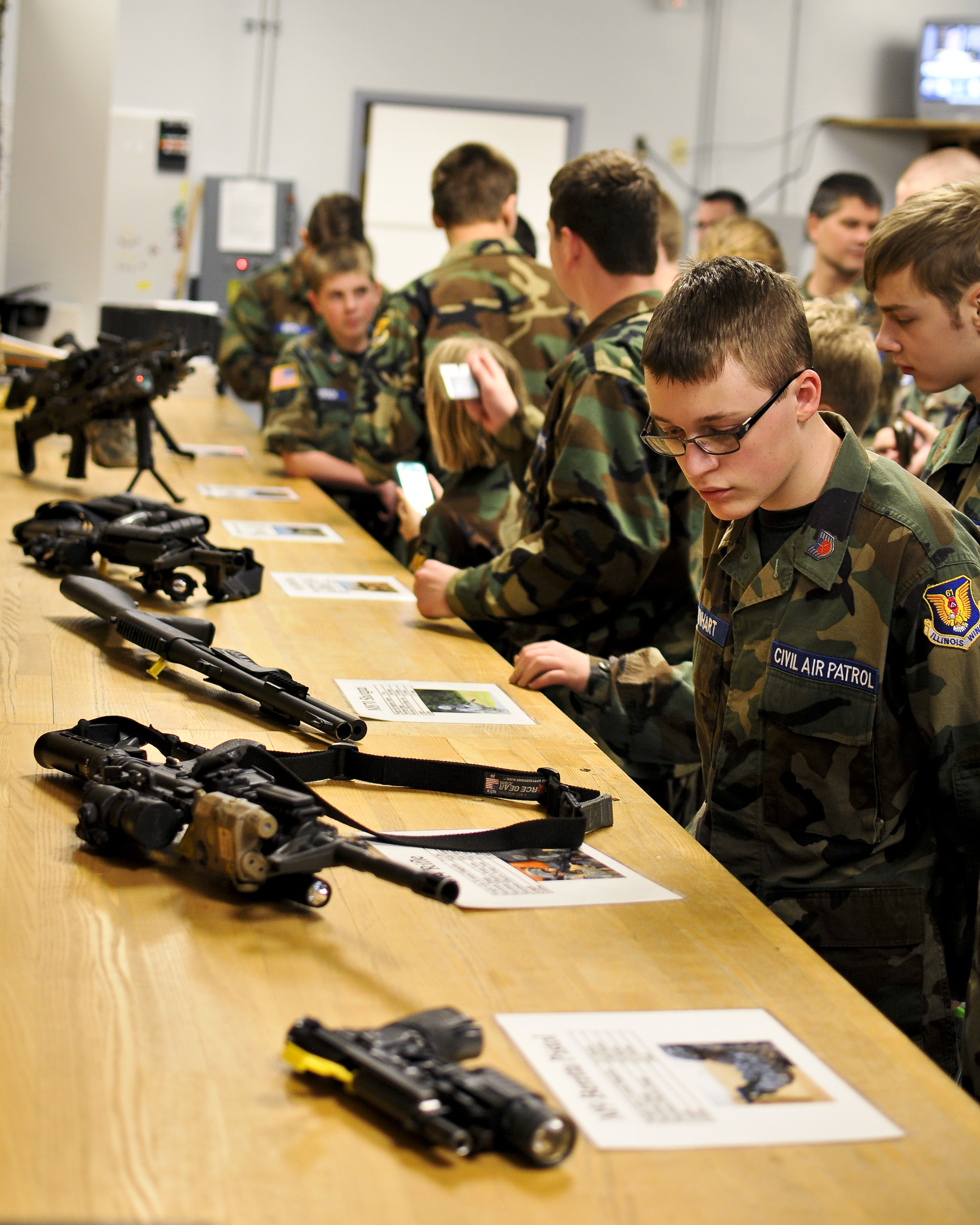
A Civil Air Patrol cadet reads the nomenclature of a security forces squadron M4 carbine at the 182nd Airlift Wing.

Squadrons of Illinois Wing
Group	Designation	Squadron Name	Location
Wing HQ	IL-001	Illinois Wing Headquarters	
Legislative	IL-999	State Legislative Squadron	
Group 01	IL-061	Shawnee Composite Squadron	Marion
	IL-205	Scott Composite Squadron	Scott Air Force Base
	IL-286	286th Composite Squadron	East Alton
Group 02	IL-067	Magnus Composite Squadron	North Riverside
	IL-189	Colonel Shorty Powers Composite Squadron	Bolingbrook
	IL-317	Thunder Composite Squadron	Monee
	IL-329	Lewis Composite Squadron	Romeoville
	IL-332	Cornelius Coffey Composite Squadron	South Holland
Group 03	IL-004	Peoria Composite Squadron	Peoria
	IL-036	Springfield Composite Squadron	Springfield
	IL-240	McLean County Composite Squadron	Bloomington
	IL-303	Decatur Flight	Decatur
	IL-327	Champaign Composite Squadron	Champaign
Group 04	IL-008	Quad City Composite Squadron	Moline
	IL-251	Rockford Composite Squadron	Rockford
	IL-271	Dekalb County Composite Squadron	Dekalb
	IL-284	Illinois Valley Composite Squadron	Peru
	IL-334	Whiteside County Composite Squadron	Rock Falls
Group 05	IL-075	Woodfield Composite Squadron	Schaumburg
	IL-263	McHenry County Composite Squadron	Greenwood
	IL-282	Lake in the Hills Composite Squadron	Lake in the Hills
	IL-274	Fox Valley Composite Squadron	West Chicago
Group 06	IL-042	Lake County Composite Squadron	Libertyville
	IL-049	Palwaukee Composite Squadron	Wheeling
	IL-090	Col Compton Composite Squadron	Evanston
	IL-312	Chicago Senior Squadron	Chicago

== Special Activities ==
Illinois Wing hosts a week long Summer Encampment each summer.

Illinois Wing hosts a Spring Encampment on the U.S. Navy's Recruit Training Command in North Chicago Illinois.

The Raymond Johnson Flight Academy has been hosted by Illinois Wing since 1967, providing cadets with familiarization and flight training in powered aircraft, sailplanes, and hot-air balloons.

== Legal protection ==
Members of Civil Air Patrol Air Patrol who are employed in Illinois are generally entitled to unpaid leave from their place of employment when taking part in a Civil Air Patrol mission. Employers who employ between fifteen and fifty employees must provide Civil Air Patrol members with up to fifteen days of unpaid leave annually for employees performing a Civil Air Patrol mission. Employers who employ more than fifty employees must provide Civil Air Patrol members up to thirty days of unpaid leave annually to respond to Civil Air Patrol missions. Employers are forbidden from requiring employees to use accrued vacation leave, personal leave, compensatory leave, sick leave, disability leave, or any other leave to cover the time period the employee is deployed on a mission. These rights are guaranteed under Illinois law.

== Aircraft ==
Illinois Wing is assigned seven powered aircraft.

== See also ==
- Illinois Air National Guard
