= KHP (disambiguation) =

KHP may refer to:

- Potassium hydrogen phthalate, a chemical compound
- khp, the ISO 639-3 for Kapori language
- Kansas Highway Patrol, the highway patrol agency for the U.S. state of Kansas
- Khuddakapāṭha (Khp), a Theravada Buddhist scripture
- Khairpur railway station, the station code KHP
- Kharkiv railway station, the station code KHP
- Kentucky Highway Patrol, a defunct law enforcement agency of Kentucky, U.S.
- Kids Help Phone, the Canadian company
- China, the state in East Asia which is abbreviated as КНР in Russian
