= Kentucky State Police =

- Patch of the KSP

- Flag of Kentucky
- Abbreviation: KSP
- Motto: The Thin Gray Line

Agency overview
- Formed: July 1, 1948
- Preceding agencies: Kentucky Highway Patrol; Kentucky Active Militia
- Employees: 1,630 (as of 2017)
- Annual budget: $227 million

Jurisdictional structure
- Operations jurisdiction: Kentucky, USA
- Area: 40,434 square miles (104,720 km^{2})
- Population: 4,241,474 (2007 est.)
- Legal jurisdiction: As per operations jurisdiction
- General nature: Civilian police

Operational structure
- Headquarters: 919 Versailles Road, Frankfort, Kentucky 40601
- Troopers: 1006 (authorized, as of 2022)
- Civilian employees: 764 (as of 2014)
- Agency executive: Colonel Phillip Burnett, Jr., KSP Commissioner
- Parent agency: Kentucky Justice and Public Safety Cabinet
- Special Units: Special Operations; West and East Drug Enforcement; Critical Incident Response Team; Cannabis Suppression; Aircraft Support; Vehicle Investigations; Commercial Vehicle Enforcement

Facilities
- Posts: 16

Website
- Official website

The Kentucky State Police (KSP) is a department of the Kentucky Justice and Public Safety Cabinet, and the official state police force of the Commonwealth of Kentucky, responsible for statewide law enforcement. The department was founded in 1948 and replaced the Kentucky Highway Patrol. The department's sworn personnel hold the title State Trooper, and its nickname is The Thin Gray Line.

== History ==
In 1948, the Kentucky General Assembly enacted the State Police Act, creating the Kentucky State Police and making Kentucky the 38th state to create a force whose jurisdiction extends throughout the given state. The act was signed July 1 of that year by Governor Earle C. Clements. The force was modeled after the Pennsylvania State Police. The force was the successor agency to the Kentucky Highway Patrol, and inherited the equipment and officers from that organization. KSP is the premier law enforcement agency of Kentucky, having full jurisdiction in all 120 counties and all 33 independent cities. Guthrie F. Crowe served as the force's first commissioner.

== Posts ==
Kentucky State Police troopers operate from 16 regional posts: West Troop contains Posts 1, 2, 3, 4, 5, 12, 15 and 16. East Troop contains Posts 6, 7, 8, 9, 10, 11, 13 and 14. There are also Regional Offices of the KSP Division of Commercial Vehicle Enforcement. West Troop contains Regions 1, 2 and 3. East Troop contains Regions 4, 5 and 6. The Special Enforcement Troop contains Cannabis Suppression, West Drug Enforcement, East Drug Enforcement, Aircraft Support, Vehicle Investigations, Special Operations and the Critical Incident Response Team.

West Troop

- Post 1: Mayfield
- Post 2: Madisonville
- Post 3: Bowling Green
- Post 4: Elizabethtown
- Post 5: Campbellsburg
- Post 12: Frankfort
- Post 15: Columbia
- Post 16: Henderson

East Troop

- Post 6: Dry Ridge
- Post 7: Richmond
- Post 8: Morehead
- Post 9: Pikeville
- Post 10: Harlan
- Post 11: London
- Post 13: Hazard
- Post 14: Ashland

The KSP Division of Commercial Vehicle Enforcement operates from six regional offices:

West Troop

- Region 1 Henderson
- Region 2 Louisville
- Region 3 Georgetown

East Troop

- Region 4 London
- Region 5 Morehead
- Region 6 Pikeville

In addition, the Special Enforcement Troop includes the following branches:

- Cannabis Suppression
- West Drug Enforcement
- East Drug Enforcement
- Aircraft Support
- Vehicle Investigations
- Special Operations
- Critical Incident Response Team (CIRT)

== Organization ==
=== Uniforms of the KSP ===
Troopers wear the standard French gray KSP uniform, consisting of a short sleeve and long sleeve version. Winter trousers are charcoal gray with a 1" black stripe down the side. Summer trousers are French gray with 1" black stripe. Patent leather chukka high top shoes are worn with both uniforms. The badge is worn on the left side of the shirt, with the trooper's name plate directly below on the left breast pocket flap. Officers wear their rank insignia on the shirt collar while all other troopers wear their rank, if applicable, on their shirt sleeves. A white crew neck T-shirt is worn under the uniform shirt. KSP requires a tie with long sleeve it is tucked into the uniform shirt. The campaign hat is French gray in color, and troopers are issued two hats: straw for summer and felt for winter. A Kentucky State Police full color brass seal is worn on the front of the hat. The hat cord is light gray. Commercial Vehicle Enforcement officers uniforms are identical to that of troopers except that the uniform are tan instead of French gray.

=== Vehicles ===
The Kentucky State Police use a variety of police cruisers and patrol vehicles. The current fleet consists of:

- Dodge Charger 5.7L AWD PPV
- Ford Super Duty Crime Scene Response vehicle (one unit per post)
- Ford Explorer Utility Police Interceptors (Commercial Vehicle Enforcement & Post Supervisor)
- Ford Taurus Police Interceptors (Facilities Security)
- Chevrolet Tahoe PPV
- Dodge Durango PPV

The Dodge Charger 5.7L AWD PPV currently serves as the primary KSP fleet vehicle although, since 2024, they are scheduled to be replaced upon age out with the Dodge Durango. This is due to the discontinuation of the Charger PPV. In addition, in 2011, KSP tested a series of vehicles to replace the Ford Ford Crown Victoria Police Interceptor, which was the primary KSP fleet vehicle. These tests included the Chevy Caprice PPV, Ford Taurus as well as the Charger PPV with some of these test vehicles remaining in the KSP fleet. The KSP Division of Commercial Vehicle Enforcement currently utilize the Chevy Tahoe Utility Police Interceptor as they retire their fleet of Ford Explorer and Chevrolet Caprice PPV's. The KSP Facilities Security Branch currently use Ford Taurus-based Police Interceptors.

=== Sidearm ===
In 2017 troopers transitioned from the Glock Model 35 .40 S&W to the Glock Model 17 Gen 5 9mm as their primary sidearm. Troopers also carry a Glock 43x 9mm as their backup sidearm. The Walther PPK/S is also authorized by the KSP as a backup sidearm as well. Prior to 2017 troopers carried a traditional 12 gauge shotgun as their long-range alternative to their sidearm and transitioned to a Smith & Wesson M&P15 patrol rifle (.223). Prior to the Glock Model 35 troopers carried the 10mm Smith & Wesson (Model 1076 was used by the KSP).

=== Overview ===
The department's headquarters are located at 919 Versailles Road in Frankfort while its training academy is located in the former Frankfort Career Development Center at 380 Coffee Tree Road in Frankfort. Cadets training to become troopers undergo a 24-week, paramilitary-style training program. Potential cadets who hold their Kentucky Peace Officers Professional Standards (POPS) certification and have two years of experience as a local, county or state (including Kentucky State Park Rangers and Conservation Officers with the Kentucky Department of Fish & Wildlife Resources) law enforcement officer in Kentucky are eligible to apply to become troopers through the department's Law Enforcement Accelerated Program (LEAP). Those accepted as LEAP cadets must meet all of the other requirements for acceptance into the KSP Academy and undergo an accelerated 13-week academy training class. Sworn Commercial Vehicle Enforcement officers undergo an initial 18 weeks of basic law enforcement officer training at the Department of Criminal Justice Training Academy in Richmond. This is followed by an eight-week training program at the KSP Academy that provides specialized training on commercial vehicle compliance and highway enforcement. After graduation, probationary troopers & CVE officers must complete field training under the supervision of a training trooper/officer at their assigned post (troopers) or region (CVE officers). KSP Facilities Security Branch officers must meet the requirements for and receive a Special Law Enforcement Officer (SLEO) commission under KRS 61.900-930 as well as undergo specialized training, including firearms training. KSP telecommunicators must complete a six-week training program at the KSP Academy.

The KSP operates the state's system of regional crime labs. In addition, the KSP Facilities Security Branch, along with specially assigned state troopers, is responsible for protecting the Governor, Lieutenant Governor, members of the Kentucky General Assembly and state property, including the Kentucky State Capitol Complex.

On July 14, 2008, the Kentucky Vehicle Enforcement department, which is responsible for commercial vehicle enforcement, became an operational division of the KSP.

The department also operates Trooper Island Camp, a juvenile crime prevention program at Dale Hollow Lake State Park.

On February 15, 2017, then-Commissioner Rick Sanders announced the formation of the Critical Incident Response Team (CIRT). Experienced KSP detectives from throughout the Commonwealth were chosen to investigate Officer Involved Shootings (OIS) as well as Critical Incidents that involved Police or Corrections agencies.

=== Rank structure ===
Title	Insignia
Colonel - Commissioner	
Lieutenant Colonel	
Major	
Captain	
Lieutenant	
Sergeant	
Master trooper	No Insignia
Trooper first class	No Insignia
Senior Trooper	No Insignia
Trooper	No Insignia

=== Structure ===
- Commissioner of the State Police
  - Executive Security Branch
  - Legal Office
  - Administration Division
    - Programs
      - Drivers Testing Branch
      - Facilities Security Branch
      - Financial and Grant Management Branch
      - Highway Safety Branch
      - Inspections and Evaluation Section
      - Legislative Security Branch
      - Media Relations Branch
      - Strategic Planning Branch
    - Internal Operations
      - Academy Branch
      - Human Resources Branch
      - Internal Affairs Branch
      - Properties Management and Supply Branch
      - Recruitment Branch
  - Commercial Vehicle Enforcement Division
    - West Troop
      - Region 1
      - Region 2
      - Region 3
    - East Troop
      - Region 4
      - Region 5
      - Region 6
  - Operations Division
    - West Troop
      - Post 1
      - Post 2
      - Post 3
      - Post 4
      - Post 5
      - Post 12
      - Post 15
      - Post 16
    - East Troop
      - Post 6
      - Post 7
      - Post 8
      - Post 9
      - Post 10
      - Post 11
      - Post 13
      - Post 14
    - Special Enforcement Troop
      - Cannabis Suppression
      - West Drug Enforcement
      - East Drug Enforcement
      - Aircraft Support
      - Vehicle Investigations
      - Special Operations
      - Critical Incident Response Team (CIRT)
  - Technical Services Division
    - Forensic Division
      - Central Laboratory – (Frankfort)
      - Eastern Laboratory – (Ashland)
      - Jefferson Laboratory – (Louisville)
      - Northern Laboratory – (Cold Spring)
      - Southeast Laboratory – (London)
      - Western Laboratory – (Madisonville)
    - Office of the Chief Information Officer
      - Communications and Computer Technologies Branch
      - Criminal Identification and Records Branch
      - Headquarters Communications Branch
      - Intelligence Branch

== Demographics ==
=== As of 2025 ===
- Male: 97.25%
- Female: 2.75%
- White: 96.7%
- African-American/Black: 2.5%
- Asian: 0.8%

== See also ==
- Kentucky Active Militia
- List of law enforcement agencies in Kentucky
- State police
- Highway patrol
- Kentucky
- Kentucky Marijuana Strike Force
