= Kentucky Vehicle Enforcement =

Statewide law enforcement agency for Kentucky, U.S.

Kentucky State Police Division of Commercial Vehicle Enforcement
Agency overview
- Formed: July 14, 2008
- Preceding agency: Kentucky Department of Vehicle Enforcement
- Jurisdiction: Commonwealth of Kentucky
- Headquarters: KSP Headquarters; 919 Versailles Road, Frankfort, KY 40601
- Agency executives: Phillip Burnett, Jr., Colonel - KSP Commissioner; Nathaniel Day, Major - CVE Commander; Michael Simpson, Captain - CVE Central; Joey Conn, Captain - CVE West; Jamie Collins, Captain - CVE East
- Parent agency: Kentucky State Police
- Website: https://kentuckystatepolice.org/commercial-vehicle-enforcement/

The Kentucky State Police Division of Commercial Vehicle Enforcement (CVE), commonly known in the Commonwealth as Kentucky Vehicle Enforcement (KVE), is a statewide law enforcement agency for the Commonwealth of Kentucky. The Division employs both sworn officers and civilian commercial vehicle inspectors. CVE's primary purpose is the enforcement of all state laws/regulations on commercial and non commercial vehicles traveling throughout the Commonwealth of Kentucky. CVE's secondary purpose is to conduct drug interdiction operations on the Commonwealth's state and county highways, working jointly with the KSP's Special Operations Division D.E.S.I. (Drug Enforcement and Special Investigations) unit. The CVE Division operates and monitors the Commonwealth's system of commercial vehicle weigh stations throughout Kentucky. Their headquarters is located in Frankfort.

== History ==
The Division of Commercial Vehicle Enforcement was a stand-alone department (known as the Kentucky Department of Vehicle Enforcement) until July 14, 2008, when an executive order from then-Governor Steve Beshear, integrated it into the Kentucky State Police (KSP).

Kentucky Vehicle Enforcement Police patch prior to their transfer to the Kentucky State Police. As of 2017, CVE officers wear the same KSP shoulder patch as state troopers.

== Mission statement ==
The organization's Mission Statement was as follows: "The mission of the Division of Commercial Vehicle Enforcement is to encourage and promote a safe driving environment through education and safety awareness while enforcing State and Federal laws and regulations, placing special emphasis on commercial vehicles."

== Organization ==
The Division was divided into three regions: CVE West, CVE Central, and CVE East. The three regions operated six regional offices.

- CVE West - Ballard, Caldwell, Calloway, Carlisle, Christian, Crittenden, Daviess, Fulton, Graves, Hancock, Henderson, Hickman, Hopkins, Livingston, Lyon, McCracken, McLean, Marshall, Muhlenberg, Ohio, Todd, Trigg, Union, Webster Adair, Allen, Barren, Breckenridge, Bullitt, Butler, Casey, Clinton, Cumberland, Edmonson, Grayson, Green, Hardin, Hart, Jefferson, Larue, Logan, Marion, Meade, Metcalfe, Monroe, Nelson, Russell, Simpson, Taylor, Warren and Washington Counties.
- CVE Central - Bell, Clay, Harlan, Knox, Laurel, McCreary, Pulaski, Rockcastle, Wayne, Whitley, Anderson, Boone, Bourbon, Bracken, Campbell, Carroll, Fayette, Franklin, Gallatin, Grant, Harrison, Henry, Kenton, Nicholas, Oldham, Owen, Pendleton, Robertson, Scott, Shelby, Spencer, Trimble and Woodford Counties.
- CVE East - Breathitt, Floyd, Johnson, Knott, Leslie, Letcher, Magoffin, Martin, Perry and Pike Counties.

== See also ==
- List of law enforcement agencies in Kentucky
