= Kentucky Marijuana Strike Force =

Task force

- Active: 1990–present
- Country: United States
- Agency: Office of the Governor of Kentucky; Kentucky State Police
- Type: multi-agency law enforcement task force
- Role: Law enforcement; marijuana eradication
- Operations jurisdiction: Federal; Kentucky
- Headquarters: Frankfort, Kentucky

The Kentucky Marijuana Strike Force, also known as the Kentucky Governor's Marijuana Strike/Task Force, is a multi-agency law enforcement task force managed by the Office of the Governor of Kentucky and Kentucky State Police Marijuana Suppression Branch, and composed of local, state and federal agencies organized expressly to eradicate illegal cannabis cultivation and trafficking in Kentucky. The task force was established in 1990, to combat marijuana cultivation on public lands in Kentucky that ranks third in the United States, behind California and Tennessee. An estimated $1 billion worth of marijuana is seized in Kentucky annually.

In the wake of the 1989 arrest of the Cornbread Mafia by the Western Kentucky OCDETF, the task force was created in July 1990 by executive order from then Kentucky Governor Wallace Wilkinson. with the backing of the Office of National Drug Control Policy.

Member agencies include the Kentucky Justice Cabinet, Kentucky State Police, Kentucky National Guard, Kentucky Fish and Wildlife, Office of the Attorney General of Kentucky, National Park Service, Civil Air Patrol, Drug Enforcement Administration, US Forest Service, US Marshalls Service, the Federal Bureau of Investigation, the US Attorney's Office for the Eastern District of Kentucky and local sheriff and police departments. The strike force often uses helicopters to fly eradication teams into remote marijuana grow sites in Eastern Kentucky.

Much of the enforcement efforts of the Kentucky Marijuana Strike Force, that occur during the eradication season that lasts from April to October, are concentrated in the area of the Daniel Boone National Forest, in the Appalachian region of eastern Kentucky historically associated with moonshine production, which often ranks first for most marijuana plants eradicated from a national forest in the United States. The eradication effort in the Daniel Boone National Forest showed the most impacts when just 17,000 plants were eradicated from the forest in 2009, compared to the 250,000 plants seized the year before.

== In popular culture ==
- Lieutenant Brent Roper, Kentucky Marijuana Strike Force Commander, was interviewed in 2010 for CNBC's documentary “Marijuana USA”.

== See also ==
- War on drugs
- Office of National Drug Control Policy
- Tennessee Governor's Task Force on Marijuana Eradication
