= Albert Henry Near =

United States Army Air Forces officer

Albert Henry Near (February 19, 1897 – May 27, 1951) was the first Commander of the Kentucky Wing Civil Air Patrol, which was headquartered at Bowman Field in Louisville, Kentucky.

Near was born in Petoskey, Emmet County, Michigan. He was appointed as the Kentucky Wing Commander (KYWG CC) from December 1, 1941 and served until March 22, 1942. The Kentucky Wing of the Civil Air Patrol (CAP) was originally assigned to Region 5 which included Indiana, Ohio, and West Virginia The CAP National Headquarters had Kentucky designated as Wing #53 in accordance with a newly established numbering system for all CAP units. At the time of his appointment, Colonel Near was superintendent of Bowman Field and chairman of the Kentucky Aeronautics Commission, having been originally appointed by Kentucky Governor Keen Johnson in 1941. When the United States became involved with World War II, Albert Neal was a Major with the United States Army Air Forces (USAAF) and assigned to England. He had previously served in World War I as a maintenance sergeant and eventually attained the rank of lieutenant colonel in the USAAF during World War II. His other achievements included membership on President Harry Truman’s Air Coordinating Committee; first chairman of the Kentucky Aeronautical Commission; president of the American Association of Airport Executives; vice-president of the National Aeronautic Association; and director of the Louisville Airport. Near died in Louisville, Kentucky, on Sunday, May 27, 1951, after suffering from a cerebral hemorrhage that occurred on Wednesday, May 23, 1951.
