= List of law enforcement agencies in Kentucky =

This is a list of law enforcement agencies in the Commonwealth of Kentucky.

According to the US Bureau of Justice Statistics' 2008 Census of State and Local Law Enforcement Agencies, the state had 389 law enforcement agencies employing 7,833 sworn police officers, about 183 for each 100,000 residents.

== State agencies ==
- Kentucky Department of Agriculture Law Enforcement
- Kentucky Division of Forestry
  - Kentucky Forest Wardens
- Kentucky Department of Fish and Wildlife Resources
  - Kentucky State Conservation Officers
- Kentucky Department of Parks
  - Kentucky State Park Rangers
- Kentucky Horse Park Police
- Kentucky Justice and Public Safety Cabinet
  - Kentucky Department of Corrections
  - Kentucky Department of Juvenile Justice
  - Kentucky State Police
    - Division of Commercial Vehicle Enforcement
    - Facilities Security Branch
- Kentucky Office of the Attorney General
  - Kentucky Department of Criminal Investigation
- Kentucky Public Protection Cabinet
  - Kentucky Department of Charitable Gaming Enforcement
  - Kentucky Department of Alcoholic Beverage Control
- Kentucky State Fair Board Police Department

== County agencies ==
- Adair County Sheriff's Office
- Adair County Constable
  - Adair County Constable District 1
  - Adair County Constable District 2
  - Adair County Constable District 3
  - Adair County Constable District 4
  - Adair County Constable District 5
  - Adair County Constable District 6
  - Adair County Constable District 7
- Allen County Sheriff's Office
- Allen County Constable
  - Allen County Constable District 1
  - Allen County Constable District 2
  - Allen County Constable District 3
  - Allen County Constable District 4
  - Allen County Constable District 5
- Anderson County Sheriff's Office
- Anderson County Constable
  - Anderson County Constable District 1
  - Anderson County Constable District 2
  - Anderson County Constable District 3
  - Anderson County Constable District 4
  - Anderson County Constable District 5
  - Anderson County Constable District 6
- Ballard County Sheriff's Office
- Ballard County Constable
  - Ballard County Constable District 2
  - Ballard County Constable District 3
  - Ballard County Constable District 5
- Barren County Sheriff's Office
- Barren County Constable
  - Barren County Constable District 1
  - Barren County Constable District 2
  - Barren County Constable District 3
  - Barren County Constable District 4
  - Barren County Constable District 5
  - Barren County Constable District 6
  - Barren County Constable District 7
- Bath County Sheriff's Office
- Bath County Constable
  - Bath County Constable District 1
  - Bath County Constable District 2
  - Bath County Constable District 3
- Bell County Sheriff's Office
- Boone County Sheriffs Office
- Boone County Constable
- Boone County Constable District 1
  - Boone County Constable District 2
  - Boone County Constable District 3
- Bourbon County Sheriff's Office
- Bourbon County Constable
  - Bourbon County Constable District 1
  - Bourbon County Constable District 5
- Boyd County Sheriff's Office
  - Boyd County Detention Center
  - Boyd County Constables Office District 1
- Boyle County Sheriff's Office
- Bracken County Sheriff's Office
- Breathitt County Sheriff's Office
- Breckinridge County Sheriff's Office
- Bullitt County Sheriff's Office
  - Bullitt County Detention Center
- Butler County Sheriff's Office
- Caldwell County Sheriff's Office
- Calloway County Sheriff's Department
- Campbell County Sheriff's Office
- Campbell County Constables
- Carlisle County Sheriff's Office
- Carroll County Sheriff's Office
- Carter County Sheriff's Office
  - Carter County Detention Center
- Casey County Sheriff's Office
- Christian County Sheriff's Office
- Christian County Constable
  - Christian County Constable District 1
  - Christian County Constable District 2
  - Christian County Constable District 3
  - Christian County Constable District 4
  - Christian County Constable District 5
  - Christian County Constable District 6
  - Christian County Constable District 7
  - Christian County Constable District 8
- Clark County Sheriff's Office
- Clay County Sheriff's Office
  - Clay County Constable District 6
- Clinton County Sheriff's Office
- Crittenden County Sheriff's Office
- Cumberland County Sheriff's Office
- Daviess County Sheriff's Office
- Edmonson County Sheriff's Office
- Elliott County Sheriff's Office
- Estill County Sheriff's Office
- Fayette County Sheriff's Office
- Fayette County Constable
  - Fayette County Constable District 1
  - Fayette County Constable District 2
  - Fayette County Constable District 3
- Fleming County Sheriff's Office
- Fleming County Constables Office
- Floyd County Sheriff's Office
  - Floyd County Detention Center
- Franklin County Sheriff's Office
  - Franklin County Detention Center
- Franklin County Constables Office
- Fulton County Sheriff's Office
- Gallatin County Sheriff's Office
- Garrard County Sheriff's Office
- Garrard County Police Department
- Grant County Sheriff's Office
  - Grant County Detention Center
- Graves County Sheriff's Office
- Grayson County Sheriff's Office
- Green County Sheriff's Office
- Greenup County Sheriff's Office
  - Greenup County Detention Center
- Hancock County Sheriff's Office
- Hardin County Sheriff's Department
- Harlan County Sheriff's Department
- Harrison County Sheriff's Office
- Harrison County Constable
  - Harrison County Constable District 3
  - Harrison County Constable District 4
  - Harrison County Constable District 5
- Hart County Sheriff's Office
- Henderson County Sheriff's Office
- Henry County Sheriff's Office
- Hickman County Sheriff's Office
- Hopkins County Sheriff's Office
- Hopkins County Constable
  - Hopkins County Constable District 1
  - Hopkins County Constable District 2
  - Hopkins County Constable District 3
  - Hopkins County Constable District 4
  - Hopkins County Constable District 5
  - Hopkins County Constable District 6
  - Hopkins County Constable District 7
- Jackson County Sheriff's Office
- Jefferson County Sheriff's Office
- Jefferson County Constable
  - Jefferson County Constable District 1
  - Jefferson County Constable District 2
  - Jefferson County Constable District 3
- Jessamine County Sheriff's Office
- Jessamine County Constable
  - Jessamine County Constable District 1
  - Jessamine County Constable District 2
  - Jessamine County Constable District 3
  - Jessamine County Constable District 4
  - Jessamine County Constable District 5
  - Jessamine County Constable District 6
- Johnson County Sheriff's Office
- Johnson County Constable
  - Johnson County Constable District 1
  - Johnson County Constable District 2
- Kenton County Sheriff's Office
- Knott County Sheriff's Office
- Knott County Constable
  - Knott County Constable District 1
- Knox County Sheriff's Office
- Knox County Constable
  - Knox County Constable District 1
  - Knox County Constable District 2
  - Knox County Constable District 3
  - Knox County Constable District 4
  - Knox County Constable District 5
- LaRue County Sheriff's Office
- Laurel County Sheriff's Office
- Lawrence County Sheriff's Office
- Lee County Sheriff's Office
- Leslie County Sheriff's Office
- Letcher County Sheriff's Office
- Lewis County Sheriff's Office
  - Lewis County Detention Center
- Lincoln County Sheriff's Office
- Livingston County Constable District 4
- Livingston County Sheriff's Office
- Logan County Sheriff's Office
- Lyon County Sheriff's Office
- Madison County Sheriff's Office
  - Madison County Detention Center
- Madison County Constable
  - Madison County Constable District 1
  - Madison County Constable District 2
  - Madison County Constable District 3
  - Madison County Constable District 4
- Magoffin County Sheriff's Office
- Marion County Sheriff's Office
- Marshall County Sheriff's Office
- Martin County Sheriff's Office
- Martin County Constable
  - Martin County Constable District 1
  - Martin County Constable District 2
  - Martin County Constable District 3
  - Martin County Constable District 4
  - Martin County Constable District 5
- Mason County Sheriff's Office
- McCracken County Sheriff's Department
- McCreary County Sheriff's Office
- McLean County Sheriff's Department
- Meade County Sheriff's Department
- Menifee County Sheriff's Office
- Mercer County Sheriff's Office
- Metcalfe County Sheriff's Office
- Monroe County Sheriff's Office
- Montgomery County Sheriff's Office
- Morgan County Sheriff's Office
- Muhlenberg County Sheriff's Office
- Nelson County Sheriff's Office
- Nicholas County Sheriff's Office
- Ohio County Sheriff's Office
- Oldham County Sheriff's Department
- Owen County Sheriff's Office
- Owsley County Sheriff's Office
- Pendleton County Sheriff's Office
- Perry County Sheriff's Office
- Pike County Sheriff's Office
- Powell County Sheriff's Office
- Pulaski County Sheriff's Office
- Robertson County Sheriff's Office
- Robertson County Constables
- Rockcastle County Sheriff's Office
- Rowan County Sheriff's Office
  - Rowan County Detention Center
- Russell County Sheriff's Office
- Scott County Sheriff's Office
  - Scott County Detention Center
- Shelby County Sheriff's Office
- Simpson County Sheriff's Office
- Spencer County Sheriff's Office
- Taylor County Sheriff's Office
- Todd County Sheriff's Office
- Trigg County Sheriff's Office
- Trimble County Sheriff's Office
- Union County Sheriff's Office
- Warren County Sheriff's Office
- Washington County Sheriff's Office
- Wayne County Sheriff's Office
- Webster County Sheriff's Office
- Whitley County Sheriff's Office
  - Whitley County Detention Center
- Wolfe County Sheriff's Department
- Woodford County Sheriff's Office

== City agencies ==
- Adairville Police Department
- Albany Police Department
- Alexandria Police Department
- Allen Police Department
- Ashland Police Department
- Auburn Police Department
- Audubon Park Police Department
- Augusta Police Department
- Barbourville Police Department
- Bardstown Police Department
- Barlow Police Department
- Beattyville Police Department
- Bellefonte Police Department
- Bellevue Police Department
- Benton Police Department
- Benham Police Department
- Berea Police Department
- Bluegrass Army Depot Police Department
- Bowling Green Police Department
- Brandenburg Police Department
- Brooksville Police Department
- Butler Police Department
- Calvert City Police Department
- Carrollton Police Department
- Catlettsburg Police Department
- Central City Police Department
- Coal Run Village Police Department
- Cold Springs Police Department
- Corbin Police Department
- Columbia Police Department
- Carlisle Police Department
- Campbellsville Police Department
- Covington Police Department
- Cynthiana Police Department
- Danville Police Department
- Dayton Police Department
- Drakesboro Police Department
- Dry Ridge Police Department
- Edgewood Police Department
- Elkhorn City Police Department
- Elkhown Police Department
- Elkton Police Department
- Elizabethtown Police Department
- Elsmere Police Department
- Erlanger Police Department
- Falmouth Police Department
- Evarts Police Department
- Flatwoods Police Department
- Florence Police Department
- Fort Mitchell Police Department
- Fort Thomas Police Department
- Fort Wright Police Department
- Frankfort Police Department
- Fulton Police Department
- Georgetown Police Department
- Glasgow Police Department
- Greenup Police Department
- Harrodsburg Police Department
- Hartford Police Department
- Hazard Police Department
- Harlan Police Department
- Henderson Police Department
- Heritage Creek Police Department
- Highland Heights Police Department
- Hillview Police Department
- Hodgenville Police Department
- Hollow Creek Police Department
- Hopkinsville Police Department
- Horse Cave Police Department
- Hurstbourne Acres Police Department
- Grayson Police Department
- Greenup Police Department
- Greenville Police Department
- Guthrie Police Department
- Independence Police Department
- Indian Hills Police Department
- Irvine Polive Department
- Jeffersontown Police Department
- LaGrange Police Department
- Lakeside Park/Crestview Hills Police Authority
- Lexington Police Department
- Lincolnshire Police Department
- London Police Department
- Ludlow Police Department
- Louisa Police Department
- Loyall Police Department
- Louisville Metro Police Department
- Lynch Police Department
- Lyndon Police Department
- Madisonville Police Department
- Meadowvale Police Department
- Middlesboro Police Department
- Middletown Police Department
- Millersburg Police Department
- Morehead Police Department
- Morgantown Police Department
- Mount Washington Police Department
- Mt. Olivet Police Department
- Muldraugh Police Department
- Neon Police Department
- Newport Police Department
- Nicholasville Police Department
- Northfield Police Department
- Olive Hill Police Department
- Owensboro Police Department
- Owenton Police Department
- Owingsville Police Department
- Paducah Police Department
- Park Hills Police Department
- Pioneer Village Police Department
- Paris Police Department
- Pikeville Police Department
- Pineville Police Department
- Pippa Passes Police Department
- Powderly Police Department
- Prestonsburg Police Department
- Providence Police Department
- Raceland Police Department
- Radcliff Police Department
- Richmond Police Department
- Russell Police Department
- Sadieville Police Department
- Saint Matthews Police Department
- Shepherdsville Police Department
- Shively Police Department
- Silver Grove Police Department
- Simpsonville Police Department
- Somerset Police Department
- Southgate Police Department
- South Shore Police Department
- Stamping Ground Police Department
- Strathmoore Police Department
- Stanford Police Department
- Smith Grove Police Department
- Scottsville Police Department
- Sparta Police Department
- Shelbyville Police Department
- Taylor Mill Police Department
- Taylorsville Police Department
- Vanceburg Police Department
- Versailles Police Department
- Villa Hills Police Department
- Vine Grove Police Department
- Wayland Police Department
- West Buechel Police Department
- Wilder Police Department
- Wilmore Police Department
- Williamsburg Police Department
- Williamstown Police Department
- Winchester Police Department
- Woodlawn Park Police Department
- Worthington Police Department
- Wheelwright Police Department

== Airport police ==
- Blue Grass Airport Department of Public Safety
- Cincinnati/Northern Kentucky Intl. Airport Police Department
- Louisville Int'l/Regional Airport Authority Public Safety

== County police ==
- Campbell County Police Department
- Kenton County Police Department
- Knott County Police Department
- Oldham County Police Department
- Leslie County Police Department

== Community corrections ==
- Kenton County Detention Center
- Lexington-Fayette Urban County Division of Community Corrections
- Louisville Metro Department of Corrections
- Warren County Regional Juvenile Detention Center

== University agencies ==
- Eastern Kentucky University Police Department
- Kentucky State University Police Department
- Morehead State University Police Department
- Murray State University Police Department
- Northern Kentucky University Police Department
- Transylvania University Public Safety
- University of Kentucky Police Department
- University of Louisville Police Department
- University of Pikeville Public Safety
- Western Kentucky University Police Department
- Southern Baptist Theological Seminary Police Department

== Public schools police ==
- Bourbon County Schools Police Department
- Carter County Schools Police Department
- Clark County Schools Police Department
- Daviess County Schools Police Department
- Fayette County Public Schools Police Department
- Greenup County Schools Division of Law Enforcement
- Harlan County Public Schools Police Department
- Jefferson County Public Schools Police Department
- Johnson County Schools Police Department
- Laurel County Schools Police Department
- Lee County Schools Police Department
- Letcher County Board of Education Police Department
- Martin County Board of Education Police Department
- Menifee County Schools Police Department
- McCracken County Schools Campus Police
- Montgomery County Schools Police Department
- Pike County Board of Education Police Department
- Pulaski County Schools Police Department
- Taylor County Schools Police Department

== Railroad police ==
- Amtrak Police
- CSX Transportation Railroad Police
- Norfolk Southern Railway Police
- RJ Corman Railroad Police

== Specialized police agencies ==
- Tennessee Valley Authority Police Department
- Kentucky Marijuana Strike Force
- Southern Baptist Theological Seminary Police

== Law enforcement training academies ==
- Department of Criminal Justice Training Academy
- Lexington/Fayette Urban County Police Department Academy
- Kentucky State Police Academy
- Kentucky DOC Eastern Region Training Center
- Louisville Metro Police Training Academy
- Bowling Green Training Academy

== Defunct agencies ==
- Blaine Police Department
- Boone County Police Department
- Boyd County Police Department
- Bromley Police Department
- Crescent Springs Police Department
- Crescent Park Police Department
- Devondale Police Department
- Dixie Police Authority
- Eden Police Department
- Fayette County Police Department
- Graymoor-Devondale Police Department
- Graymoor Police Department
- Highland Heights/Southgate Police Authority
- Hindman Police Department
- Houston Acres Police Department
- Inez Police Department
- Jefferson County Police Department
- Kentucky Christian College Police Department
- Kentucky Highway Patrol
- Kentucky Vehicle Enforcement
- Kentucky Water Patrol
- Latonia Police Department
- Lynnview Police Department
- Lexington Division of Police
- Louisville Police Department
- Rolling Hills Police Department
- Sandy Hook Police Department
- South Fort Mitchell Police Department
- Walton Police Department
- Warfield Police Department
- Woodford County Police Department
- Wallins Police Department
- Wurtland Police Department
- Vicco Police Department
