= Kentucky Highway Patrol =

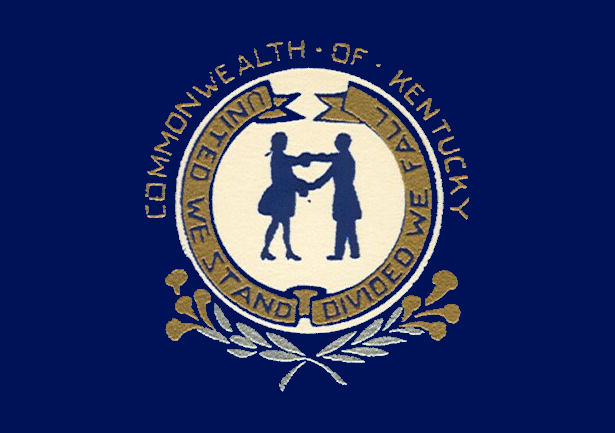
- Old flag of Kentucky from the 1940s
- Abbreviation: KHP

Agency overview
- Formed: 1936
- Dissolved: July 1, 1948
- Superseding agency: Kentucky State Police

Jurisdictional structure
- Operations jurisdiction: Kentucky, U.S.
- Area: 40,434 square miles (104,720 km^{2})
- Legal jurisdiction: As per operations jurisdiction
- General nature: Civilian police

The Kentucky Highway Patrol was founded in 1936 when the Division of Highway Patrol was created as a part of the Kentucky State Highway Department. The Highway Patrol began with 40 officers who enforced traffic laws on Kentucky roads. By 1948 the Kentucky Highway Patrol had 200 officers.

The 1939–40 Police Blue Book published by the International Association of Chiefs of Police listed 146 employees, 56 patrol cars, and 21 motorcycles for the Kentucky Highway Patrol.

On July 1, 1948, the Kentucky Highway Patrol was abolished due to the passage of the State Police Act, which was promoted by Governor Earle C. Clements. The Kentucky Highway Patrol was replaced by the Kentucky State Police, a new agency whose officers had full police powers, not limited to traffic laws. The new Kentucky State Police inherited the officers and equipment of the Kentucky Highway Patrol.

== Fallen officers ==
Six Kentucky highway patrolmen died while on duty during the Kentucky Highway Patrol's 12-year history.

== See also ==
- List of law enforcement agencies in Kentucky
- State police
- State patrol
- Highway patrol
