= Kentucky Active Militia =

- Active: 1941-1947
- Country: United States
- Allegiance: Kentucky
- Type: State defense force
- Role: Military reserve force

Commanders
- Civilian leadership: Governor Keen Johnson; Governor Simeon S. Willis

The Kentucky Active Militia was an official state defense force of Kentucky. It was created to assume the stateside duties of the Kentucky National Guard while the National Guard was in federal service during World War II.

== History ==
During World War I, the state of Kentucky passed legislation allowing for the state to maintain troops other than the National Guard; four companies of State Guard were raised to replace the Kentucky National Guard while it was deployed.

During World War II, the Kentucky Active Militia was created by the Kentucky Active Militia Law, signed by Governor Keen Johnson. The Kentucky Active Militia was responsible for assuming the stateside duties of the Kentucky National Guard. This included policing the Kentucky Derby. Kentucky Active Militia members were armed with two foot long strips of rubber hose and given crowd control responsibilities. By 1944, the Kentucky Active Militia had a strength of 1,674 men.

== Legal status ==
The authority of each state to maintain its own state defense force is recognized by the federal government of the United States under Title 32, Section 109 of the United States Code. Approximately twenty-three states and the Commonwealth of Puerto Rico currently maintain state defense forces. Under Kentucky law, the governor of Kentucky has the legal authority to activate the state defense force, to be known as the Kentucky State Defense Force, whenever any part of the Kentucky National Guard is in federal service.
