= Indiana Wing Civil Air Patrol =

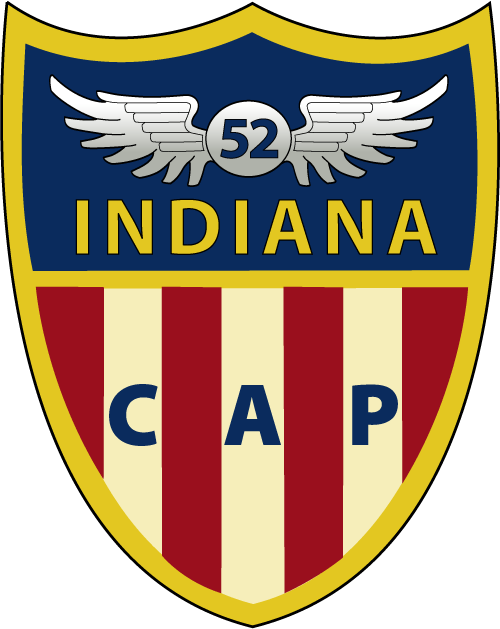
- Indiana Wing of Civil Air Patrol

Associated branches
- United States Air Force

Command staff
- Commander: Col Jamie Griffith
- Deputy Commander: Lt Col David McDonald

Current statistics
- Cadets: 893
- Seniors: 519
- Total Membership: 1,412
- Website: inwg.cap.gov
- Statistics as of August 17, 2025

The Indiana Wing Civil Air Patrol (abbreviated INWG) is the highest echelon of Civil Air Patrol in the state of Indiana. Its headquarters is located in Terre Haute, Indiana. The Indiana Wing involves 1,354 adult and youth volunteers organized into five group headquarters, a legislative squadron, and twenty-five total subordinate squadrons located throughout the state, including four School Enrichment Programs. Civil Air Patrol's 2nd largest cadet squadron, the Anderson Preparatory Academy Cadet Squadron (GLR-IN-803), is located in Anderson, Indiana.

== Missions ==
Indiana Wing performs Civil Air Patrol's three key missions: emergency services, which includes search and rescue (by air and ground) and disaster relief operations; aerospace education for youth and the general public; and cadet programs for teenage youth.

Indiana Wing supports Civil Air Patrol's Emergency Services missions by flying eight Civil Air Patrol aircraft, small Unmanned Aerial Vehicles, and operating twenty vehicles. The Wing operates 19 high-frequency (HF) stations, and 16 very high-frequency (VHF) repeaters and 177 VHF base and mobile radios. Indiana Wing is involved in search and rescue, humanitarian assistance, and disaster relief.

Indiana Wing offers the CAP Cadet Program in a number of communities across the state, and provides a free orientation flight program that flew 277 cadets in 2023. Of the 2023 flights, cadets were provided 348 powered orientation flights and 52 glider orientation flights.

Support for CAP's Aerospace Education mission includes outreach to schools, education for cadets, and participation in local aviation events. As part of CAP's Aerospace Education program teachers who join Civil Air Patrol as an "Aerospace Education Member" may receive a flight in CAP aircraft as well as free national academic-standard aligned books, STEM kits, and award programs. The AEM program has a one-time only fee with no requirement for meeting attendance and uniform wear—and is available for home schools. Additionally, Indiana Wing maintains a hot air balloon for aviation education and community outreach.

== Organizational structure ==
Indiana Wing is organized into a wing headquarters unit, five group headquarters overseeing 25 squadrons, and a legislative squadron. In addition, the Anderson Preparatory Academy Cadet Squadron reports directly to the wing headquarters.

Four group headquarters are aligned with Indiana's Department of Homeland Security districts and have oversight for the squadrons within those districts. The fifth group headquarters oversees units within school districts.

- Indiana Group I: IDHS Districts 1, 2, and 4
- Indiana Group III: IDHS Districts 3 and 6.
- Indiana Group V: IDHS District V.
- Indiana Group XII: IDHS Districts 7, 8, 9, and 10.
- Indiana Group 800: Indiana Wing Schools Group

-
Group	Designation	Squadron Name	Location	Notes
XII	IN-002	Monroe County Composite Squadron	Bloomington	
I	IN-036	Valparaiso Composite Squadron	Valparaiso	
I	IN-049	St Joe Valley Cadet Squadron	Nappanee	
V	IN-069	Col James H. Kasler Senior Squadron	Greenwood	
I	IN-084	Lafayette Composite Squadron	West Lafayette	
I	IN-085	Ferrier Cadet Squadron	Camden	
III	IN-086	Grant County Cadet Flight	Gas City	
V	IN-123	Weir Cook Cadet Squadron	Indianapolis International Airport	
XII	IN-126	Falcon Composite Squadron	New Albany	
I	IN-144	La Porte Senior Squadron	La Porte	
XII	IN-181	181st Composite Squadron	Terre Haute	
V	IN-184	Shelbyville Composite Squadron	Shelbyville	
V	IN-193	Indianapolis Senior Squadron	Indianapolis Metropolitan Airport	
III	IN-201	Fort Wayne Composite Squadron	Fort Wayne	
III	IN-205	205th Composite Squadron	Muncie	
V	IN-206	Eagle Composite Squadron	Carmel	
I	IN-211	Lake County Cadet Squadron	Lake Station	
XII	IN-214	Bakalar Composite Squadron	Columbus	
XII	IN-216	Patoka Valley Cadet Squadron	Huntingburg	
XII	IN-220	River City Cadet Squadron	Evansville	
III	IN-223	Anderson Composite Squadron	Anderson	
V	IN-228	Ft Benjamin Harrison Composite Squadron	Greenfield	
V	IN-802	Titan Cadet Squadron	McKenzie Career Center	School Enrichment Program
Direct Report to Wing HQ	IN-803	Anderson Preparatory Academy Cadet Squadron	Anderson Preparatory Academy	School Enrichment Program
I	IN-806	John Adams High School Cadet Squadron	South Bend	School Enrichment Program
Direct Report to Wing HQ	IN-999	Indiana Legislative Squadron	Indianapolis	General Assembly Members and their Staff

== Past Wing Commanders ==
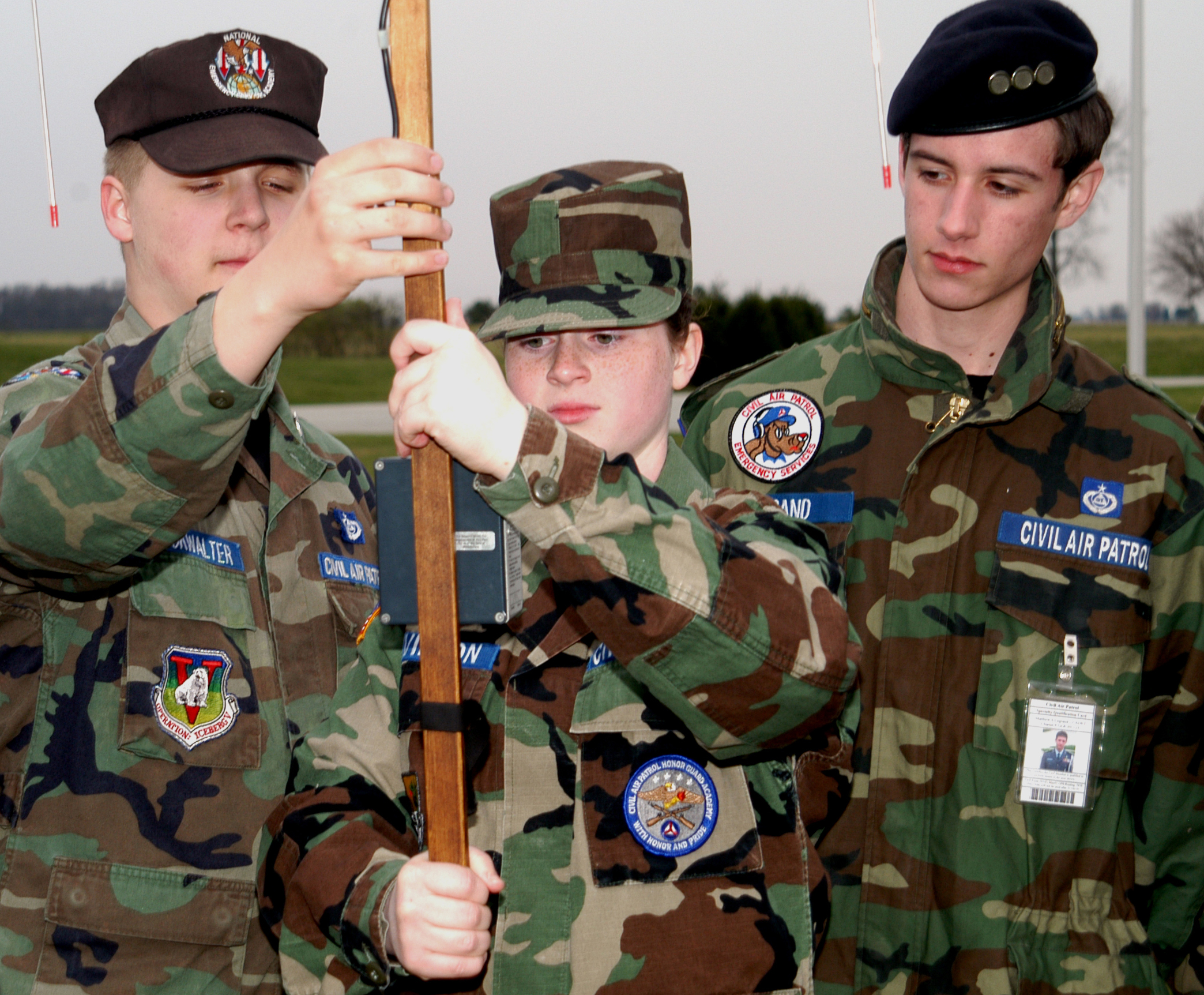
Civil Air Patrol Cadet Senior Master Sgt. Bryce Bookwalter instructs a squad of Indiana CAP cadets in the use of equipment used to locate aircraft ELT signal devices, during a ground team training exercise.

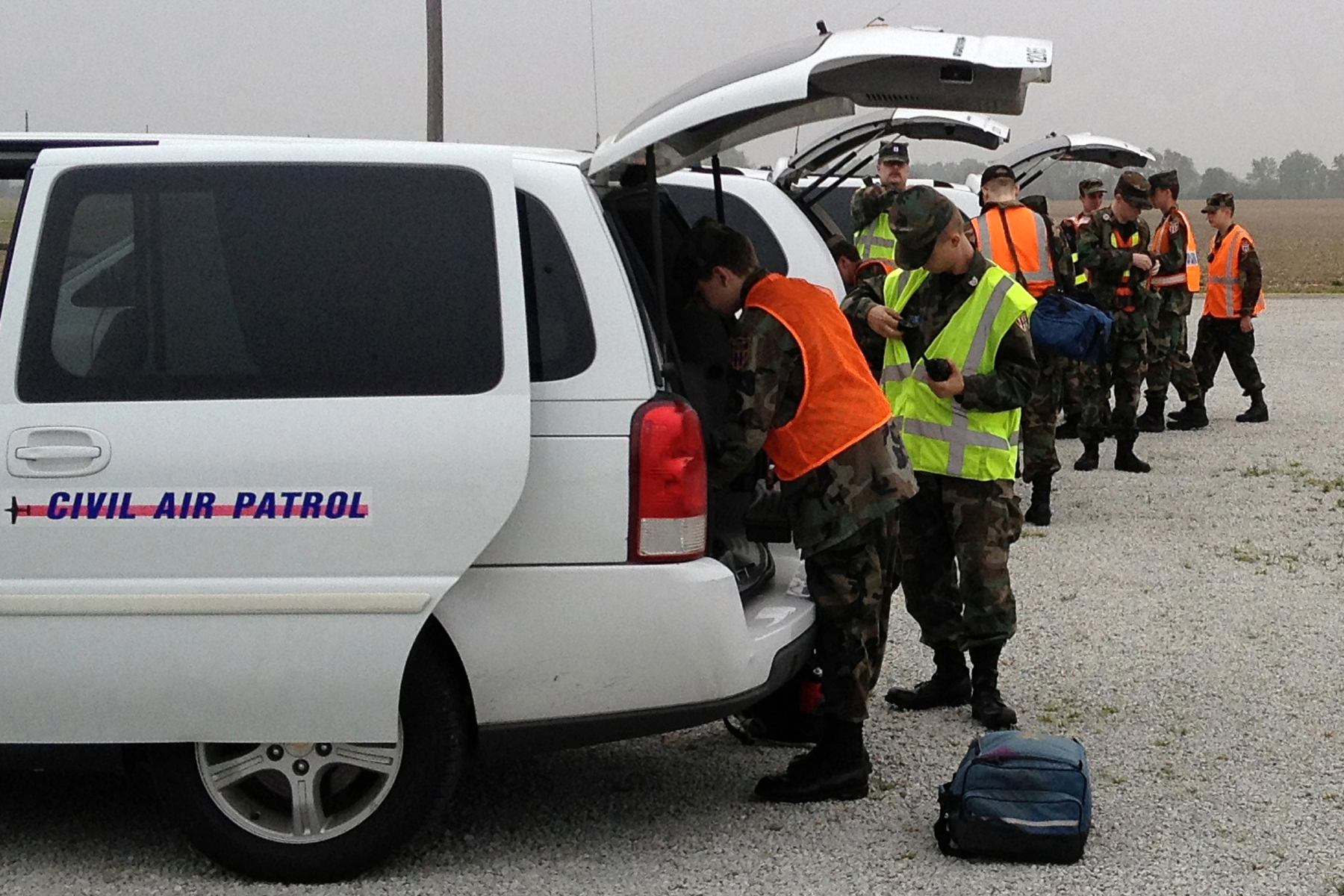
Members of the local Civil Air Patrol prepare to conduct an exercise with the Grissom emergency management team and members of the 434th Communications Squadron.

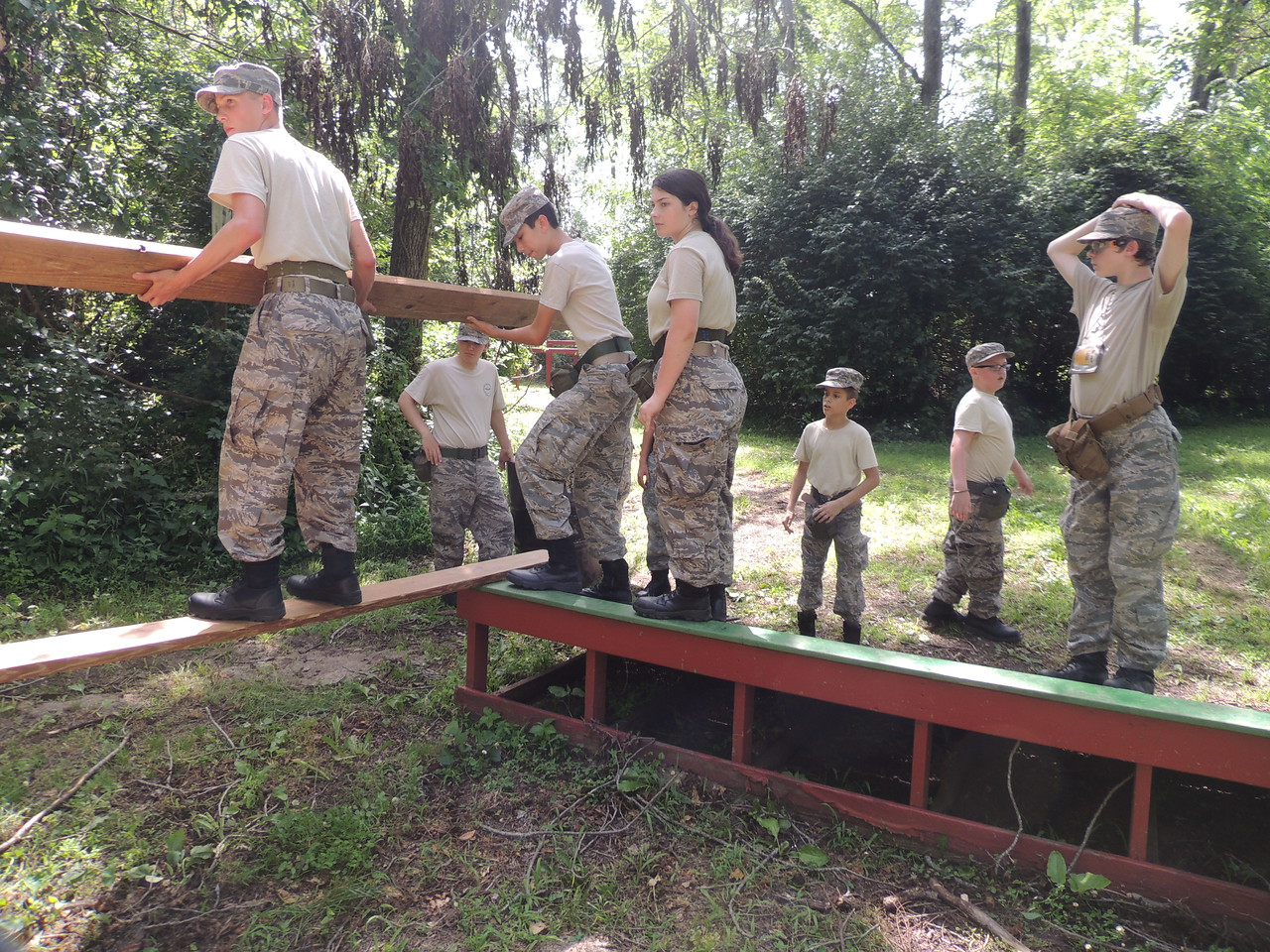
Civil Air Patrol Cadets navigate the conditioning course at Camp Atterbury.

Commanders of the Indiana Wing
Commander's Name	Period of Service
Col Walker W. Winslow	1941–1949
Col Walter B. Smith	1949–1950
Col Merle L. Denney	1950–1952
Col Wayne W. Ricks	1952–1955
Lt Col Sumner M. Sadler	1955–1956
Col Stanley H. Arnolt	1956–1959
Col Donald H. Lessig	1959–1961
Col Cecil W. Armstrong	1961–1962
Col John W. Richards	1962–1964
Col M. Fred Wood	1964–1966
Col Kenneth Lebo	1966–1970
Col M. Fred Wood	1970–1972
Col James N. Mahle	1972–1977
Col Jack R. Hornbeck *	1977–1981
Col Edwin D. DesLauries	1981–1983
Col George W. Young	1983–1987
Col Peter C. Crasher	1987–1989
Col Paul Bergman **	1989–1991
Col Joseph S. Gilkey II	1991–1992
Col Edward F. Mueller	1992–1995
Col Larry W. Landick	1995–1998
Col Glenn A. Kavich	1998–2002
Col Charles Greenwood	2002–2006
Lt Col John Bryan ***	2006–2007
Col W. Mark Reeves	2007–2010
Col Richard L. Griffith ***	2010–2013
Col Matthew R. Creed *	2013–2016
Col Philip Argenti	2016–2020
Col Robert W. Freese	2020–2023
Lt Col Aaron Angelini***	2023–2024
Col Robert W. Freese (Interim)	2024
Col Jamie Griffith***	2024–present
*Went on to serve as Great Lakes Region Commander. **Went on to serve as Great Lakes Region Commander and National Commander in the grade of Brigadier General. ***Spaatz Award recipient.	

== Spaatz Award Recipients ==
Carl A. Spaatz ribbon

The General Carl A. Spaatz Award is the highest award in the Civil Air Patrol cadet program. The award honors General Carl A. Spaatz, who was the first Chief of Staff of the United States Air Force and the second National Commander of Civil Air PatrolAir Patrol.

First awarded in 1964, only 0.5% of CAP cadets ever earn the Spaatz award. Indiana Wing ranks 18th among the 50 U.S. states in the number of Spaatz awards earned. Award recipients from Indiana include:

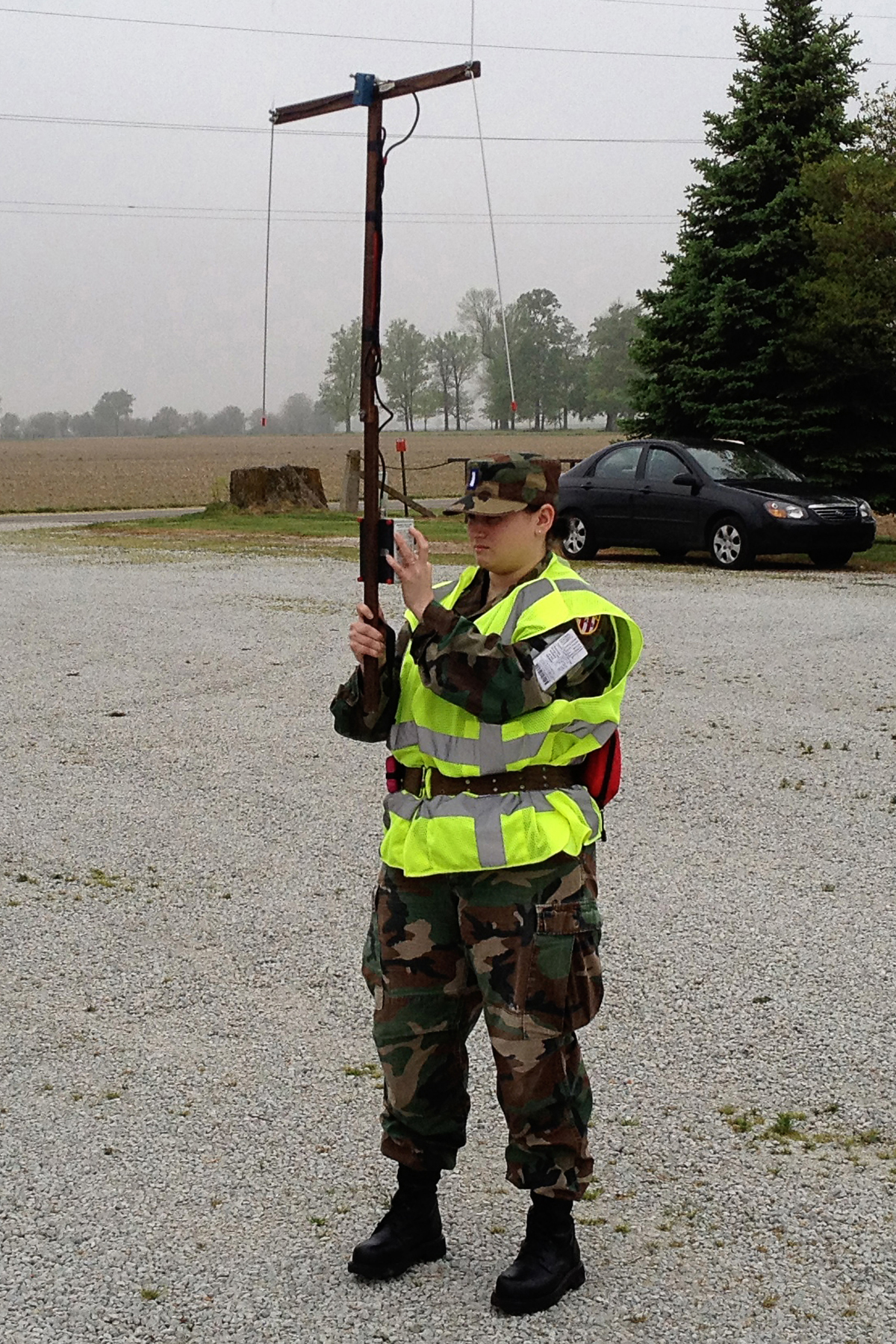
A member of the local Civil Air Patrol operates a radio direction finder during an exercise with the Grissom emergency management team and members of the 434th Communications Squadron in Kokomo, Indiana.

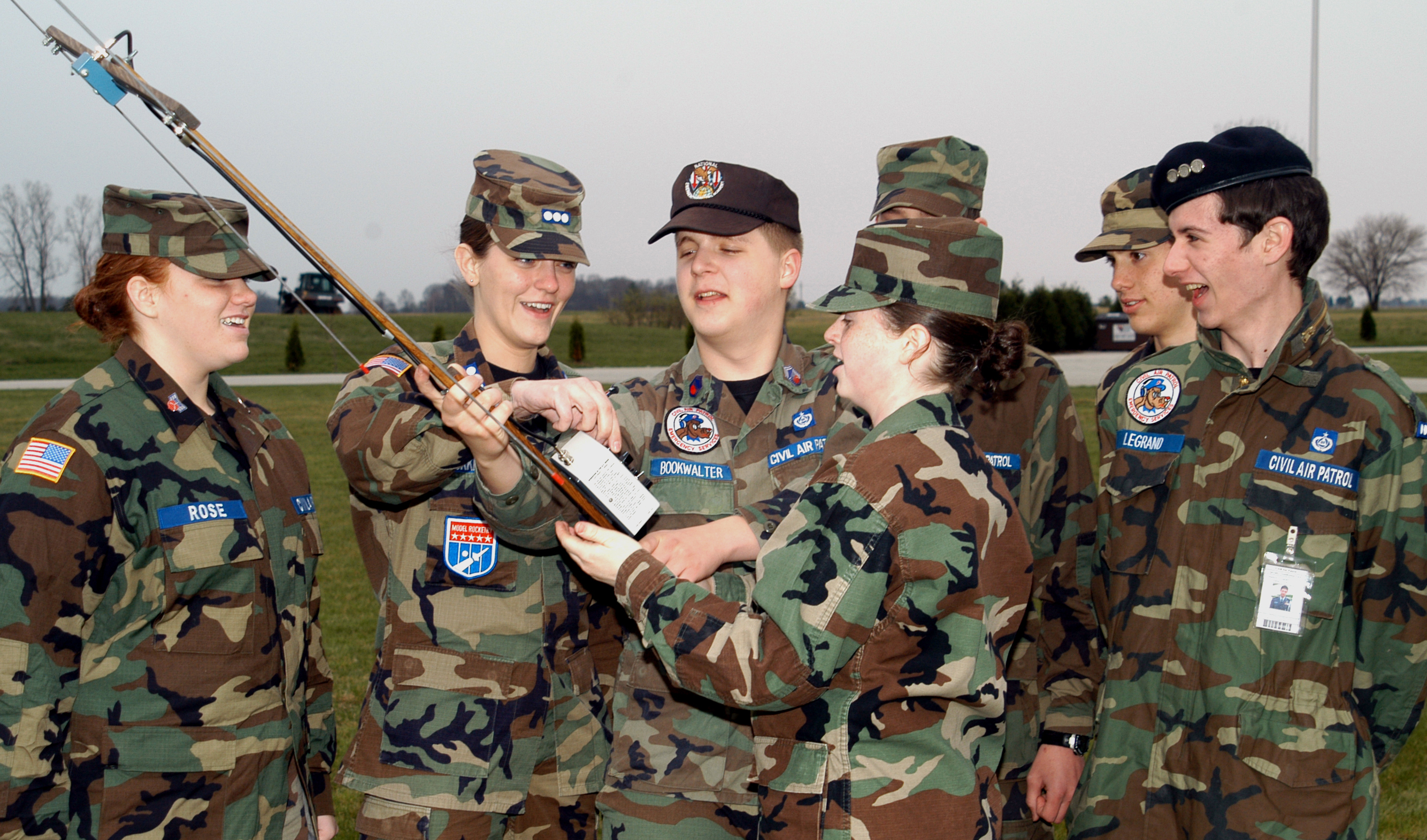
Civil Air Patrol Cadets train with direction finding equipment used to locate aircraft distress beacons referred to as ELTs.

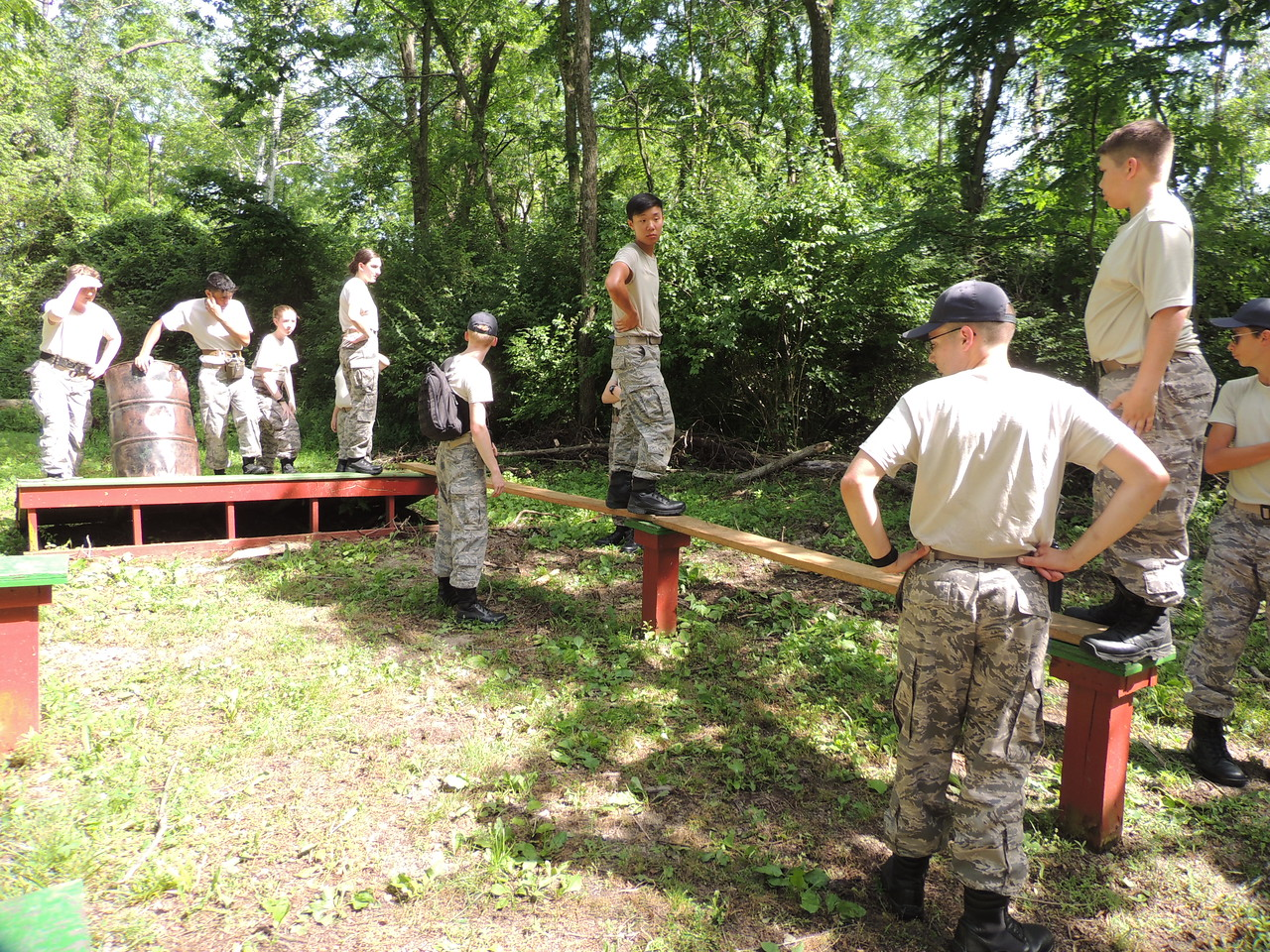
Civil Air Patrol Cadets work together to cross a gap at the conditioning course at Camp Atterbury Joint Maneuver Training Center.

Spaatz Awardees of the Indiana Wing
Award #	Spaatz Recipient	Award Date
24	David G. Ehrman	20-Sep-66
81	Bruce A. Newell	8-Jan-69
181	Michael K. Hayden	8-Sep-72
235	Christine O. McKannon	7-Sep-73
252	Melvin K. Hayden	26-Dec-73
253	Stephen G. Atkins	26-Dec-73
346	Gregory A. Moore	29-Aug-75
358	Michael D. Duke	3-Nov-75
441	Ronald F. Reimer Jr	14-Oct-77
497	Michael J. Caylor	4-Jan-79
498	George F. Williams	4-Jan-79
565	David M. Finkel	9-Feb-81
597	John M. Thackston	9-Mar-82
611	Michael T. Orr	14-Jun-82
612	David J. Amin	14-Jun-82
623	Peter J. Conte	12-Nov-82
665	John P. Moorman	30-Sep-83
679	Chris T. Conte	9-Jan-84
705	James L. Daniels	3-Aug-84
850	Patrick K. McLaughlin	8-Jun-87
852	Mathew M. Roush	11-Aug-87
972	Mark C. Rusk	12-Jan-90
1022	Thomas C. Judd	21-Aug-90
1061	Thomas A. Valentine Jr.	13-May-91
1068	Andrew D. King	24-Jun-91
1178	Michael J. Noffze	6-Jul-93
1196	Nora L. Stephenson	8-Dec-93
1199	David B. Dennis	24-Jan-94
1228	Richard L. Griffith*	24-Oct-94
1262	John F. Bryan*	31-Jul-95
1273	Charles A. Greene	29-Sep-95
1317	Christopher C. Curtis	19-Dec-96
1318	Kathy L. Hoverman	13-Dec-96
1329	Jamie L. Foote*	27-Aug-97
1338	Kelly L. Waelde	15-Aug-96
1365	Jason T. Attinger	28-Apr-98
1454	Noel R. Schutt	19-Mar-02
1470	Meaghan N. Patten	9-Aug-02
1488	David E. Bass	13-Feb-03
1507	Philip M. Foust	27-Jun-03
1646	Kate A. Whitacre	13-Jun-07
1708	Daniel A. Fowl	20-Aug-08
1724	Thomas A. Redfield	10-Jan-09
1849	John-Paul W. Franks	10-Jul-12
1865	Christopher Weinzapfel	9-Dec-12
1867	Elizabeth A. McClamrock	12-Jan-13
1874	Sierra D. Parsons	9-Mar-13
1957	Nathan C. Shinabarger	14-Jun-14
1964	Jason S. Reed	18-Jul-14
2050	Luke Grace	13-Jun-16
2253	Kamryn T. Schmidt	10-Aug-19
2354	Tom L. Huynh	27-Jun-21
2437	Brayden M. Schrock	29-Dec-22
2457	Miriam A. Carpenter	12-May-23
2506	Caitlin O'Brien	7-Jan-24
2510	Elisa C. Miller	27-Jan-24
2522	Priscilla M. Gatewood	19-Apr-24
2537	Richard F. Griffith	15-Jul-24
2540	Andrew Wolfe	30-Jul-24
2557	Caleb R. Johnson	27-Oct-24
2589	Cameron B. Milleman	9-Jun-25
2655	Carson D. Tice	27-Jul-26
2656	Garrett D. Tice	27-Jul-26
* Subsequently, Indiana Wing commander.

== Legal protection ==
Under Indiana law, private employers whose businesses are within the borders of Indiana are forbidden from disciplining their employees who are members of the Indiana Wing, if those employees miss work in order to respond to an emergency as a part of Civil Air Patrol. Private employers are only exempted from this rule if they designate an employee as an "essential employee to the employer," and the state commander of the Indiana Wing must be notified.

The State of Indiana and all political subdivision of the state do not have a right to seek an exemption to giving Civil Air Patrol employees leave time by designating them an "essential employee to the employer." Rather, they are forbidden from penalizing any employee who takes leave from their work responsibilities to respond to a Civil Air Patrol mission.

All Indiana secondary school students, whether public or private, are entitled to leave from school to participate in Civil Air Patrol training and missions. Schools are forbidden by law from marking these students as absent or penalizing them in any way.

== See also ==
- Indiana Air National Guard
- Indiana Guard Reserve
- Civil Air Patrol
