= Kentucky National Guard =

Component of the US National Guard of the state of Kentucky

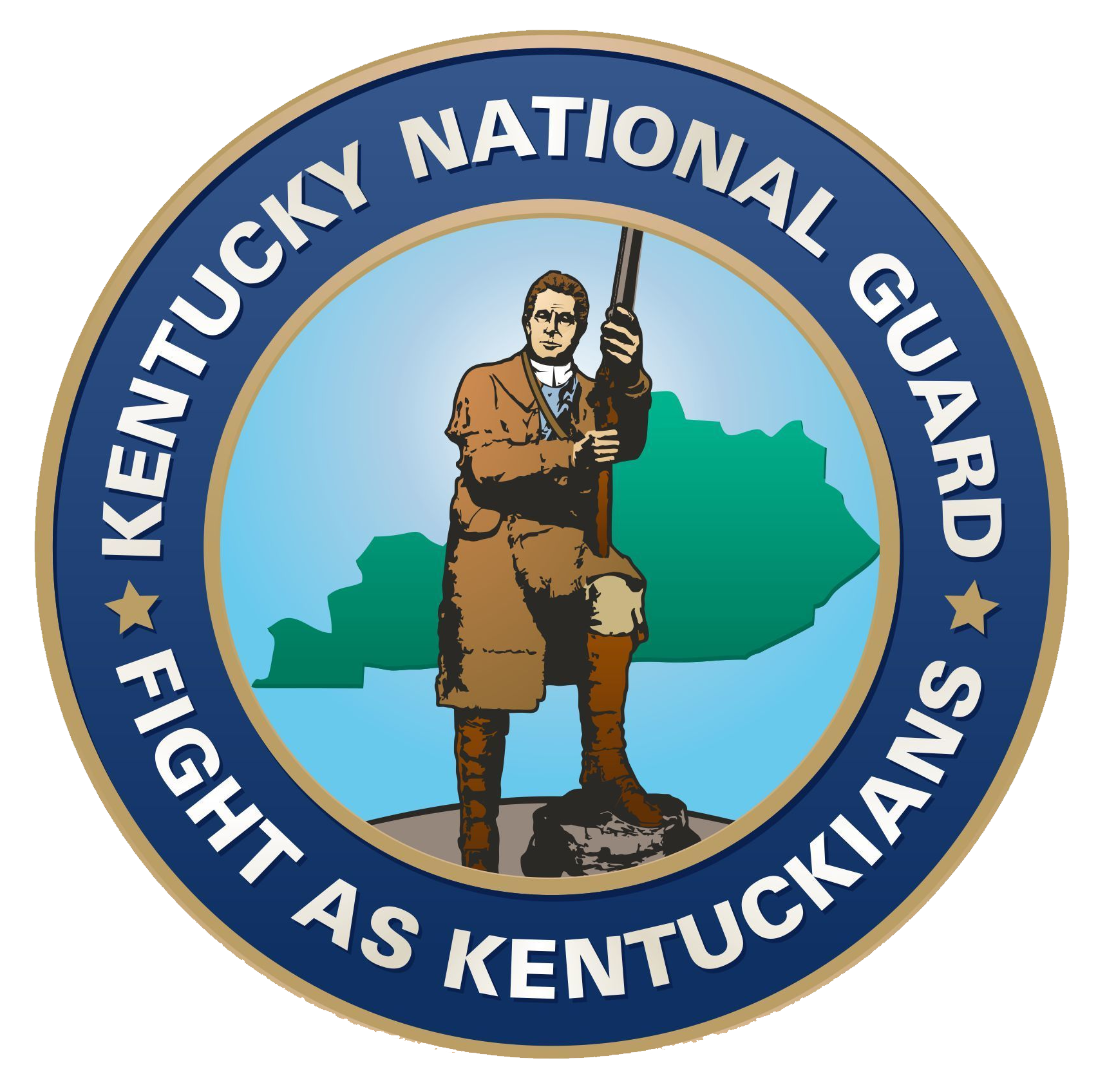
Kentucky National Guard logo honoring Daniel Boone.

The Kentucky National Guard comprises the:

- Kentucky Army National Guard
- Kentucky Air National Guard

== See also ==
- Kentucky Active Militia, the state defense force of Kentucky which replaced the Kentucky National Guard during World War I and World War II.
