= Bridgeport Police Department =

Law enforcement agency in Connecticut, US

- Patch of Bridgeport Police Department
- Abbreviation: BPD

Agency overview
- Formed: 1837; 189 years ago

Jurisdictional structure
- Operations jurisdiction: Bridgeport, Connecticut, United States
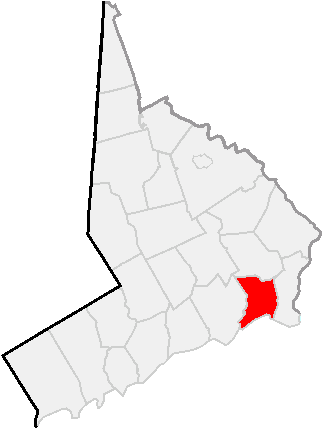
- Map of Bridgeport Police Department's jurisdiction
- Area: 19.4 square miles (50 km^{2})
- Population: 137,912
- General nature: Local civilian police

Operational structure
- Headquarters: Bridgeport, Connecticut
- Sworn members: ▼289 of 400 (2025)
- Agency executive: Roderick Porter, Chief

Website
- Bridgeport Police

The Bridgeport Police Department is the primary law enforcement agency in Bridgeport, Fairfield County, Connecticut, United States. It is responsible for most law enforcement within the geographical boundaries of City of Bridgeport, with the exception of:

- City parks, which are handled by the Bridgeport Park Police Department
- Most judicial warrants and judicial process, which are handled by the Fairfield County State Marshal
- Highway patrol, which is handled by the Connecticut State Police

Bridgeport was the first city in New England to deploy radio patrol police cars, in September 1933.

== Leadership ==
The current Bridgeport Police Chief is Roderick Porter. Roderick Porter has thirty-six years of Law Enforcement experience; thirty of which were served with the Bridgeport Police Department. He has been the Chief since December 2022.

== Officer salary ==
In 2012, the maximum annual salary for police officers was $168,374. In 2020, Connecticut Post sent a Freedom Of Information Request to Bridgeport. It was discovered former police Chief Armando Perez earned $461,061 in 2019. 61 out of the 100 highest earners in Bridgeport were police officers in 2019.

== Crime ==
The department operates within Connecticut's most populous city.

Per the BDP Crime Statistics (2019-2024) Report published by the department, annual citizen complaints decreased from 139 annually in 2019 to 96 annually in 2024 (−31% decrease). Homicides decreased from 15 annually in 2019 to 10 in 2024.

=== Major standoffs ===
==== July 2008 standoff ====
This was a seven-hour standoff situation off Capital Avenue with a mentally unstable man who was heavily armed and believed he was a Soviet spy. The man barricaded himself in his home with his family, including his wife and several children. The standoff lasted for several hours and was a top story in Connecticut.

==== January 2008 standoff ====
In January 2008 a 30-minute standoff occurred. Several buildings and streets were evacuated to make way for police. After 30 minutes the police arrested the man for breach of peace.

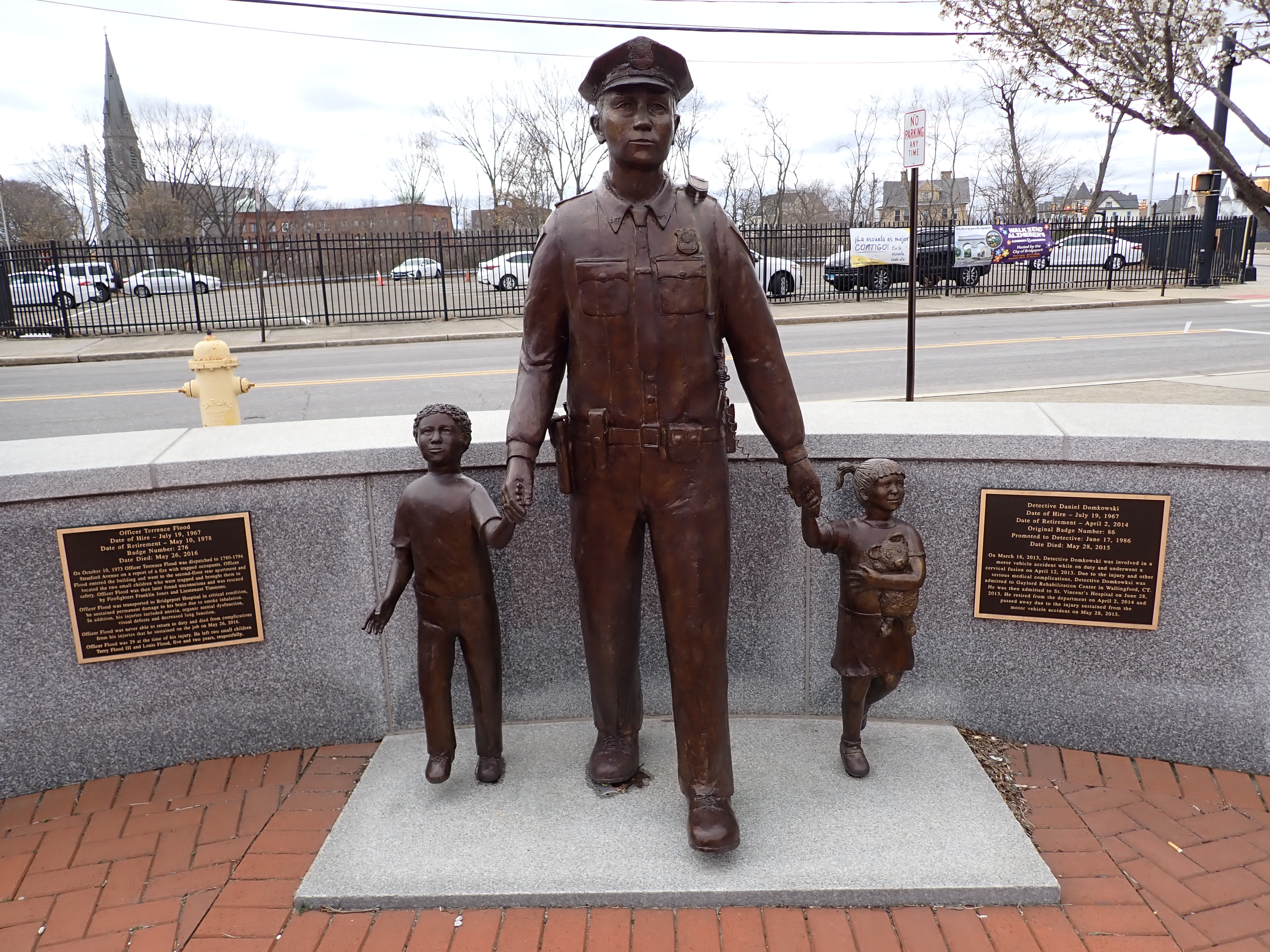
Bridgeport Police Memorial sculpture

==== June 2007 standoff ====
A two-day-long standoff resulted in Andy Garcia being arrested. The situation apparently started when police received a shots-fired call in the middle of the day. Someone reported the suspect's name and licence plate number to police, which led them to a house on Seaview Avenue. When they arrived, a man opened fire. Police evacuated the neighborhood, blocked off the street and put the house under surveillance.

==== March 2005 standoff ====
In March 2005, a man was arrested after shooting at and having a standoff with Bridgeport police officers. Police responded to a dispute call with guns involved on Black Rock Avenue. According to police the suspect had two shotguns and a rifle in the apartment, and was firing at Bridgeport police while having a dispute with a woman.

== Controversies ==
In April 1972, community members in Bridgeport sued members of BPD, along with other city officials, over a charge of police brutality during police action spurred by a rent strike in May 1971.

In 2019, Rebeca Garcia was approved by the City Council as the city’s first female Hispanic assistant police chief. The very next day she was sued. Police captains Brian Fitzgerald, Steven Lougal, and Roderick Porter, and Deputy Police Chief Anthony Armeno, who is behind the lawsuit, alleged her appointment was “unlawful and invalid.” The lawsuit alleges that “The plaintiffs possess qualifications, in the least, equal to those of Captain Rebecca (sic) Garcia, and, under the City Charter must be allowed to compete for the position of assistant police chief, unless legitimately disqualified". Rebeca Garcia eventually became acting police chief one month before the trial challenging her qualifications to be assistant chief is expected to take place.

On September 10, 2020, police chief Armando Perez was arrested by the FBI on 2 counts of wire fraud and three counts of making false statements alongside acting personnel director of Bridgeport David Dunn. Perez faces 50 years while Dunn faces 40. The investigation was a collaboration between the United States Attorney for the Southern District of New York, known for their independence and competence nationally, and the United States Attorney for the District of Connecticut. According to the news release, Perez and Dunn rigged Bridgeport's chief search to ensure Perez would be chosen. The investigation occurred in part thanks to An unnamed officer, who is labeled in court documents as "Officer-1", and his collaboration with federal agents. The documents reveal “Officer-1” recorded most of the incriminating conversations both under the command of the FBI and not under the command of the FBI. He began the recordings soon after his retirement and revealed that he along with others had a central part in the fraud. After Perez's arrest, Perez immediately resigned, and Joe Ganim replaced him with Assistant Police Chief Rebeca Garcia in an acting role. On Monday, October 5, 2020, Perez and Dunn both pleaded guilty to all charges in US District Court in front of Judge Kari A. Dooley as they waived Grand Jury indictments. She required the two pay $149,405 in restitution to the city of Bridgeport as the United States Department of Justice recommended 24 months in prison. Perez is to be sentenced on January 4, 2021, while Dunn will be sentenced on January 11, 2021.

== Popular culture ==
In the 2008 film Pistol Whipped, Steven Seagal plays a former cop from the Bridgeport Police Department.

== See also ==
- List of law enforcement agencies in Connecticut
