= List of law enforcement agencies in Connecticut =

This is a list of law enforcement agencies in the state of Connecticut.

According to the US Bureau of Justice Statistics' 2008 Census of State and Local Law Enforcement Agencies, the state had 143 law enforcement agencies employing 8,281 sworn police officers, about 236 for each 100,000 residents.

== State agencies ==
- Connecticut Department of Emergency Services and Public Protection
  - Connecticut State Police
- Connecticut State Capitol Police
- Connecticut State Division of Criminal Justice
- Connecticut Department of Correction
- Connecticut Department of Energy and Environmental Protection
  - Connecticut State Environmental Conservation Police
- Connecticut Judicial Branch
  - Court Support Services Division
    - Judicial Marshal Services
- Connecticut Department of Mental Health and Addiction Services
  - Public Safety Division
- Connecticut Department of Motor Vehicles
  - Commercial Vehicle Safety Division
- Connecticut Department of Administrative Services
  - Connecticut State Marshal

== Municipal agencies ==
Capitol
- Avon Police Department
- Berlin Police Department
- Bloomfield Police Department
- Canton Police Department
- Coventry Police Department
- East Hartford Police Department
- East Windsor Police Department
- Enfield Police Department
- Glastonbury Police Department
- Granby Police Department
- Hartford Police Department
- Manchester Police Department
- New Britain Police Department
- Newington Police Department
- Plainville Police Department
- Rocky Hill Police Department
- Simsbury Police Department
- Southington Police Department
- South Windsor Police Department
- Suffield Police Department
- Vernon Police Department
- West Hartford Police Department
- Wethersfield Police Department
- Windsor Police Department
- Windsor Locks Police Department

Greater Bridgeport

- Bridgeport Police Department
- Easton Police Department
- Fairfield Police Department
- Monroe Police Department
- Stratford Police Department
- Trumbull Police Department

Lower Connecticut River Valley

- Clinton Police Department
- Cromwell Police Department
- East Hampton Police Department
- Middletown Police Department
- Old Saybrook Police Department

Naugatuck Valley

- Ansonia Police Department
- Bristol Police Department
- Cheshire Police Department
- Derby Police Department
- Middlebury Police Department
- Naugatuck Police Department
- Plymouth Police Department
- Seymour Police Department
- Shelton Police Department
- Thomaston Police Department
- Waterbury Police Department
- Watertown Police Department
- Wolcott Police Department

Northeastern Connecticut

- Plainfield Police Department
- Putnam Police Department

Northwest Hills

- Torrington Police Department
- Winchester Police Department

South Central Connecticut

- Branford Police Department
- East Haven Police Department
- Guilford Police Department
- Hamden Police Department
- Madison Police Department (Connecticut)
- Meriden Police Department
- Milford Police Department
- New Haven Police Department
- North Branford Police Department
- North Haven Police Department
- Orange Police Department
- West Haven Police Department
- Woodbridge Police Department
- Wallingford Police Department

Southeastern Connecticut

- City of Groton Police Department
- Town of Groton Police Department
- Groton Long Point Police Department
- Ledyard Police Department
- New London Police Department
- Norwich Police Department
- Stonington Police Department
- Waterford Police Department
- Willimantic Police Department

Western Connecticut

- Bethel Police Department
- Brookfield Police Department
- Danbury Police Department
- Darien Police Department
- Greenwich Police Department
- New Canaan Police Department
- New Milford Police Department
- Newtown Police Department
- Norwalk Police Department
- Redding Police Department
- Ridgefield Police Department
- Stamford Police Department
- Weston Police Department
- Westport Police Department
- Wilton Police Department

== College and University agencies ==
- Central Connecticut State University Police Department
- Connecticut State Community College Police Department
- Eastern Connecticut State University Department of Public Safety
- Manchester Community College Police Department (To be merged with State Community College Police)
- Southern Connecticut State University Police Department
- University of Connecticut Police Department
- University of New Haven Police Department
- Western Connecticut State University Police Department
- Yale Police Department

== Other agencies ==
- Aquarion Water Company Police
- Candlewood Lake Authority Marine Patrol
- South Central Connecticut Regional Water Authority Police Department
- Lake Housatonic Lake Authority Marine Patrol
- Lake Lillinonah Authority Law Enforcement Division
- Lake Zoar Authority Marine Patrol
- Metropolitan District Commission of Connecticut
- Metropolitan Transportation Authority Police
- Rogers Lake Authority Marine Patrol

== Tribal police agencies ==
- Mashantucket Pequot Police Department
- Mohegan Tribal Police Department
