= Vehicle registration plates of the United States for 1958 =

1958 license plates in the United States

Vehicle registration plates of the United States by year
Vehicle registration plates of the United States for 1957	Events of 1958	Vehicle registration plates of the United States for 1959

Each of the 48 states of the United States of America plus several of its territories and the District of Columbia issued individual passenger license plates for 1958.

== Passenger baseplates ==
Passenger car plates
Image	Region	Design	Slogan	Serial format	Serials issued	Notes
	Alabama					
	Alaska					
	American Samoa					
	Arizona					
	Arkansas					
	California					
	Canal Zone					
	Colorado					
	Connecticut					
	Delaware					
	District of Columbia					
	Florida					
	Georgia					
	Guam					
	Hawaii					
	Idaho					
	Illinois					
	Indiana					
	Iowa					
	Kansas					
	Kentucky					
	Louisiana					
	Maine					
	Maryland					
	Massachusetts					
	Michigan					
	Minnesota					
	Mississippi					
	Missouri					
	Montana					
	Nebraska					
	Nevada					
	New Hampshire					
	New Jersey					
	New Mexico	Embossed red serial with Zia sun symbol separator on golden yellow plate with border line; "NEW MEXICO" centered at bottom; "58" at bottom right	"LAND OF ENCHANTMENT" at top	1-12345; 1/0-1234	Coded by county of issuance (1 or 1/0)	One-digit county plates had the slogan centered, while two-digit county plates had the slogan offset to the right. This practice continued until 1972. One-digit county plates additionally had "19" embossed at the bottom left.
	New York					
	North Carolina					
	North Dakota					
	Northern Mariana; Islands					
	Ohio					
	Oklahoma	Embossed black serial on white plate with border line; "58" at top right	"VISIT OKLAHOMA" at top, offset to left	1-123456; 10-12345		County-coded (1 or 10)
	Oregon					
	Pennsylvania	Embossed yellow lettering and state-shaped border on blue base. "PA 58" embossed at top.				
	Puerto Rico					
	Rhode Island					
	South Carolina					
	South Dakota					
	Tennessee					
	Texas					
	Utah					
	Vermont					
	Virginia					
	Washington					
	West Virginia					
	Wisconsin	Embossed black serial on golden yellow plate; "WIS" at top left and a red on white 1958 tab at top right.	"AMERICA'S DAIRYLAND" embossed at bottom.	A12-345; AB-1234	Coded by month of expiration	K, L, and N used in AB-1234 format as an overflow series.
	Wyoming					

== See also ==
- Antique vehicle registration
- Electronic license plate
- Motor vehicle registration
- Vehicle license
