= G. Sarsfield Ford =

American judge

Judge of the Connecticut Superior Court
- In office 1973–2001
- Nominated by: Governor Thomas J. Meskill

Chief Administrative Judge for the Connecticut Judicial Marshal Services
- In office 2001–2003
- Nominated by: Chief Court Administrator Joseph H. Pellegrino

Administrative Judge in the Fairfield Judicial District
- In office 1986–1990

Personal details
- Born: September 6, 1933 Bridgeport, Connecticut
- Died: May 19, 2013 (aged 79) Fairfield, Connecticut
- Education: University of Notre Dame; Georgetown University Law Center, J.D.

G. Sarsfield Ford (September 6, 1933 – May 19, 2013) was an American jurist.

Born in Bridgeport, Connecticut, Ford graduated from the University of Notre Dame. He then received his Juris Doctor degree from Georgetown University Law Center and was admitted to the Connecticut Bar. He practiced law in Bridgeport, Connecticut. In 1973, he was appointed to the Connecticut Superior Court, and later held the office of Chief Administrative Judge for the Connecticut Judicial Marshal Services.

== Early years ==
After graduating from St Patrick's School in 1951, Ford attended high school at Fairfield College Preparatory School, Connecticut. Following graduation from the University of Notre Dame, he became a law graduate from the Georgetown University in 1958 and joined the Connecticut Bar in February 1959.

== Career span ==
Ford worked for law firms like the Keogh and Candee in Norwalk and the Bridgeport law firm of Clancy and Kenney, also becoming a partner in the latter. 1962 saw his appointment to public defender in Fairfield County and Superior Court Judge in 1973, as designated by Governor Thomas J. Meskill. He became a Senior Judge in 2003. Judge Ford, reputed for his "fair but firm" justice, has been described as "Mr. Clean in a black robe".

== Notable cases ==
- In 1967 Ford was assistant public defender for Harlis Miller, in a case that had national coverage.
- In 1987 Ford presided over the trial of serial killer Michael Ross. The accounts of Karen Clarke of The Day are stored at the Connecticut State Library in Hartford.
- In 1997 Ford was the sole dissenter in the 11-1 censure vote of Harold H. Dean, at the time the state's most senior Superior Court judge.
- In 2000 Ford presided on the Adrian Peeler case and also split Adrian Peeler's case from his brother Russell Peeler, due to evidence in the shooting of the witnesses. Ford also presided on the case against Russell Peeler who was found guilty of ordering two murders. Ford's imposition of a life sentence when the jury deadlocked on a decision on the death penalty was later overturned in 2004 by the Connecticut Supreme Court which ordered a new sentencing hearing after appeal by the prosecutors on the case. The conviction, itself, was upheld. At a new sentencing hearing in 2007, Russell Peeler was sentenced to death, and later, in 2016, became the second formerly condemned prisoner resentenced to life in prison after Connecticut abolished the death penalty for already sentenced prisoners in 2015.

Said Ford at Russell Peeler's sentencing: He doesn't deserve any consideration. He cannot be expected to be rehabilitated and be put back on the street and stay away from the criminal element. ... I'd be a fool to expect that.

- In 2001, Ford presided over an unusual incident where a not guilty verdict was delivered but the accused had fled the courthouse.
