= Vehicle registration plates of the United States for 1957 =

1957 license plates in the United States

Vehicle registration plates of the United States by year
Vehicle registration plates of the United States for 1956	Events of 1957	Vehicle registration plates of the United States for 1958

Each of the 48 states of the United States of America plus several of its territories and the District of Columbia issued individual passenger license plates for 1957.

In 1956, the U.S. states and Canadian provinces came to an agreement with the American Association of Motor Vehicle Administrators, the Automobile Manufacturers Association and the National Safety Council that standardized the size for license plates for vehicles (except those for motorcycles) at 6 inches (15 cm) in height by 12 inches (30 cm) in width, with standardized mounting holes, which has been the standard size for North American license plates since.

== Passenger baseplates ==
Passenger car plates
Image	Region	Design	Slogan	Serial format	Serials issued	Notes
	Alabama					
	Alaska					
	American Samoa					
	Arizona					
	Arkansas					
	California					
	Canal Zone					
	Colorado					
	Connecticut					
	Delaware					
	District of Columbia					
	Florida					
	Georgia					
	Guam					
	Hawai'i					
	Idaho					
	Illinois					
	Indiana					
	Iowa					
	Kansas					
	Kentucky					
	Louisiana					
	Maine					
	Maryland					
	Massachusetts					
	Michigan					
	Minnesota					
	Mississippi					
	Missouri					
	Montana					
	Nebraska					
	Nevada					
	New Hampshire					
	New Jersey					
	New Mexico					
	New York					
	North Carolina	Embossed golden yellow serial on black plate with border line; "NORTH CAROLINA 57" at bottom	"DRIVE SAFELY" centered at top	A-1234; AB-1234		
	North Dakota					
	Northern Mariana; Islands					
	Ohio					
	Oklahoma					
	Oregon					
	Pennsylvania					
	Puerto Rico					
	Rhode Island					
	South Carolina					
	South Dakota					
	Tennessee					
	Texas					
	Utah					
	Vermont					
	Virginia					
	Washington					
	West Virginia					
	Wisconsin	Embossed black serial on golden yellow plate; "EXP" at top left, month of expiration and "57" at top right; slogan at bottom	AMERICA'S DAIRYLAND	A12-345, AB 1234	Coded by month of expiration (A). Second letters were K and L.	
	Wyoming					

== Non-passenger plates ==
Non-passenger Plates
Image (standard)	Region	Type	Design & Slogan	Serial format	Serials issued	Notes

== See also ==
- Antique vehicle registration
- Electronic license plate
- Motor vehicle registration
- Vehicle license
