= Vehicle registration plates of the United States for 1959 =

1959 license plates in the United States

Vehicle registration plates of the United States by year
Vehicle registration plates of the United States for 1958	Events of 1959	Vehicle registration plates of the United States for 1960

Each of the 49 states of the United States of America plus several of its territories and the District of Columbia issued individual passenger license plates for the year 1959.

== Passenger baseplates ==
Passenger car plates
Image	Region	Design	Slogan	Serial format	Serials issued	Notes
	Alabama	Embossed blue lettering, heart logo and rims on white base.	"HEART OF DIXIE" centered embossed at top	Coded by county of issuance: 0-12-345; 00-12-345		
	Alaska	Embossed blue numbers on golden yellow plate with border line; embossed territorial/state flag at left; "ALASKA" embossed in blue block letters centered at top; "58" embossed in top right corner	None	12345	1 to approximately 74000	1958 base plates revalidated for 1959 with white tabs.
	American Samoa					
	Arizona	Embossed white numbers on blue plate with border line; "ARIZONA 59" embossed in white block letters centered at top.	"GRAND CANYON STATE"	ABC-123	AAA-001 to approximately BDY-999	
	Arkansas	Embossed black numbers on white plate with border line; "ARKANSAS 59" embossed in black block letters centered at top	"LAND OF OPPORTUNITY"	1-12345; 10-1234		Coded by county of issuance (1 or 10)
	California	Embossed black lettering on yellow base; "CALIFORNIA" embossed at top left with "56" incused into black embossed box at top right.	None	AAA 123	unknown	1956 base plates revalidated for 1959 with black-on-white stickers.
	Canal Zone	Embossed yellow lettering on black base; embossed and centered "1959 at top and "Canal Zone at bottom	None	12345	unknown	Sample plate shown
	Colorado	Embossed white lettering on green base	"Colorful"	1-1234; 10-1234		County-coded registration
	Connecticut	Embossed white numbers on blue plate with border line; "CONNECTICUT" embossed in white block letters at bottom, offset to left	None	12345; AB123; AB1234; 123-456; AB-1234	Varied by format	
	Delaware	Reflective gold numbers riveted on dark blue, Delaware at top, insert spaces bottom. Insert format continued as original.	None	123456	4 to approximately 225000	First plate in federally mandated 6 x 12 in size. 1958 base renewed with metal tabs for 1959.
	District of Columbia				unknown	
	Florida	Embossed blue lettering and rims on white base; nickname at top with date and state name at bottom.	"SUNSHINE STATE" embossed at top between "19" and "59"	1-234567; 12-123456; 1A-23456; 12A-34567	unknown	County coded (1 or 12) and coded by vehicle weight and type (A).
	Georgia	Embossed white lettering and rims on black plate, with state name embossed at top center and nickname at bottom between halves of date.	"PEACH STATE"	1-A-2345; 12-A-3456		Coded by county (1 or 12) and class (A)
	Guam					
	Hawaii	Embossed white lettering and rims on red base. State name at bottom with slogan at top. Undated.	"ALOHA" embossed at top.	1A-234		1957 base plate in use continuously through 1960 without updated registration on plate.
	Idaho		None			
	Illinois	White lettering embossed on blue base; "ILL 33" at bottom.	"LAND OF LINCOLN" embossed at top	123 456; 1 234 567	1 to approximately 1-277-000	
	Indiana	Royal blue lettering embossed on yellow base; "IND - 59" embossed at top.	LINCOLN YEAR incused in embossed blue box at bottom.	AB 1234		County-coded
	Iowa	Embossed black numbers on yellow plate with border line; "IOWA" embossed in black block letters centered at top; "59" embossed in top right corner.	"none"	1 12345 10 12345		County-coded (1 or 10).
	Kansas	Embossed blue numbers on yellow plate with state-shaped border; "KANSAS 59" embossed in blue block letters centered at top.	"THE WHEAT STATE" embossed in blue block letters at bottom, offset to right.	A/B-12345		County-coded (A/B)
	Kentucky	Embossed white numbers on dark blue plate; "KENTUCKY" and county name embossed in wide white block letters centered at top and bottom respectively; "19" embossed in top left corner and "59" in top right corner.	None	123-456		
	Louisiana	Embossed white numbers on dark blue plate with border line; embossed white pelican in the center; "19 LOUISIANA 59" embossed in wide white block letters at top.	"SPORTSMAN'S PARADISE" embossed in narrow white block letters at bottom	123 456	1 001 to approximately 910 000	
	Maine					
	Maryland	Embossed blue numbers and rims on white plate with border line.	None			
	Massachusetts	Embossed white numbers and rims on red base. White box at top with incused "59 MASS" in red.				
	Michigan		"WATER WONDERLAND" embossed centered at the bottom.	1-234-567		Issued in front and rear pairs.
	Minnesota	Embossed blue numbers on reflective white plate with border line; "MINNESOTA" embossed in blue block letters centered at bottom; "19" embossed in bottom left corner and "58" in bottom right corner.	"10,000 LAKES" embossed in blue block letters centered at top.	1A 1234; MA1234		First number corresponds to congressional district of issue. "M" plates were mail-order issues. 1958 base plates revalidated for 1959 with green tabs.
	Mississippi	White with embossed green lettering and trim. The county name was stamped on the bottom of the license plate.	None	123-456	unknown	
	Missouri		None			
	Montana	Embossed black numbers on unpainted aluminum plate with state-shaped border; "MONTANA" embossed in wide black block letters centered below numbers; embossed "59" to right of state name.	None	1·12345; 10·1234		Coded by county of issuance (1 or 10).
	Nebraska	Black embossed lettering and rims on golden yellow base.	THE BEEF STATE embossed at bottom center	12-3456		County-coded
	Nevada	Embossed blue numbers on white plate with border line; "NEVADA" embossed in blue block letters centered at top; "EXP" embossed in top left corner and "JUN 60" in top right corner.	None	A12345; AB1234		County-coded
	New Hampshire	White base with embossed green lettering and border.	None	1-234		County-coded
	New Jersey	Black lettering embossed on straw-colored base.	None	ABC 123		
	New Mexico	Red embossed lettering and sunburst design on yellow background. "NEW MEXICO" embossed at bottom and sunburst with "33" inside embossed at left.	None	12-3456		County-coded
	New York	Embossed black lettering on gold base; "NY 33" embossed at bottom center.	"none"	A-12-34; 1A23-45		County-coded.
	North Carolina	Blue base with embossed white lettering "NORTH CAROLINA - 33" at bottom.	None	123-456		
	North Dakota	White lettering and border embossed on green base. "ND" embossed at left and "33" embossed at right.	None	123-456	1 to approximately 149-000	
	Northern Mariana Islands					
	Ohio	Embossed red lettering and rims on white plate; "1959 OHIO" embossed at bottom.	None	A·12345; AB·1234; 12345·A; 1234·AB; A·1234·B		Issued in blocks by county
	Oklahoma	Embossed yellow numbers on black plate; "OKLAHOMA 1933" embossed at bottom.	None	1-123456; 10-12345		County-coded
	Oregon		None	123-456		
	Pennsylvania	Embossed yellow lettering and state-shaped border on blue base. "PA 58" embossed at top.	None	ABC 123		
	Puerto Rico					
	Rhode Island	Embossed white numbers on black plate with border line; "RHODE ISLAND 59" embossed in white block letters above numbers.	None	AA1 to WW999		Letters I, Q and U not used, and X, Y and Z used only on replacement plates.
	South Carolina	Embossed white numbers on blue plate; "SOUTH CAROLINA 59" embossed in white block letters at top.	None	A-123-456		Coded by weight class (A)
	South Dakota	Black lettering and border on white base with stamped Mount Rushmore graphic at top.	None	1-1234; 1-A123; 12-1234; 12-A123		Coded by county (1 or 10 prefix). 1957 base plates revalidated for 1959 with red tabs.
	Tennessee	Embossed yellow numbers on black state-shaped plate with border line; "TENN. 54" embossed in yellow block letters centered at bottom.	None	1-12345; 10-1234; 1D-12345; 10D-1234		(D) in registration indicates vehicles weighing over 3,500 lbs.
	Texas	Embossed black lettering on white base. "TEXAS 59" embossed at top.	None	AB-1234		Could be revalidated for subsequent years using metal tabs.
	Utah					
	Vermont	Embossed dark green numbers on white plate; "54 VERMONT" embossed in dark green block letters centered at bottom.	None	12345; A1234		
	Virginia	Embossed white numbers on black plate; "VIRGINIA 1954" embossed in white block letters at top.	None	123-456	1 to approximately 999-999	
	Washington	Embossed white numbers on green plate; "54 WASHINGTON" embossed in white block letters at bottom.	None	123-456 A 12-345 AB		County-coded (A or AB)
	West Virginia	Embossed yellow numbers on black plate with border line; "W. VA. EXP.-6-30-54" embossed in yellow block letters at bottom.	None	123-456		
	Wisconsin	Embossed dark green numbers on white plate; "WIS" embossed in dark green block letters at top, offset to left; month of expiration and "59" embossed in top right corner.	"AMERICA'S DAIRYLAND" embossed in black block letters centered at bottom.	A12-345; AA-1234		First letter corresponds to month of expiration.
	Wyoming	Embossed black numbers and Bucking Horse and Rider on white plate with border line; "54 WYOMING" embossed in black block letters at bottom.	None	1-12345; 10-1234		County-coded

== Non-passenger plates ==
Non-passenger plates
Image (standard)	Region	Type	Design and slogan	Serial format	Serials issued	Notes

== See also ==
- Antique vehicle registration
- Electronic license plate
- Motor vehicle registration
- Vehicle license
