= Robert Ward (Connecticut politician) =

American politician (1952–2021)

3rd Commissioner of the Connecticut Department of Motor Vehicles
- In office 2007–2011
- Deputy: William Ramirez

Minority Leader of the Connecticut House of Representatives
- In office 1995–2007
- Preceded by: Edward C. Karwiecki
- Succeeded by: Lawrence F. Cafero

Member of the Connecticut House of Representatives from the 86th district
- In office 1985–2007
- Preceded by: Timothy P. Ryan
- Succeeded by: Vincent Candelora

Personal details
- Born: November 2, 1952
- Died: May 9, 2021 (aged 68) North Branford, Connecticut, U.S.
- Party: Republican
- Spouse: Anita Siena
- Children: 4
- Education: University of Connecticut (BA); University of Cincinnati (JD)

Robert M. Ward (November 2, 1952 – May 9, 2021) was an American politician who served in the Connecticut House of Representatives from 1984 to 2007, and as the minority leader from 1995 to 2007, as a member of the Republican Party. He was the longest-serving caucus leader in the state legislature in Connecticut's history.

Ward was raised in Connecticut and was educated at Notre Dame High School, University of Kentucky, University of Connecticut, and the University of Cincinnati. He entered politics when he worked as an intern for state legislator Herbert V. Camp Jr. and later became a member of the North Branford Republican Town Committee.

Ward entered electoral politics when he unsuccessfully challenged Representative Dorothy McCluskey for a seat in the Connecticut House of Representatives from the 86th district in 1980. He ran for the seat again in 1982, against Timothy P. Ryan, but lost again. He won election to the state house after defeating Ryan in the 1984 election and continued to serve until his retirement in 2006. Ward was selected to replace Edward C. Krawiecki, who was retiring, as minority leader.

He was lauded for his service in the state legislature, having been named the most effective legislator twice and the "Excellence in State Legislative Leadership" award by the National Conference of State Legislatures. After leaving the state legislature he served on the University of Connecticut Board of Trustees, as Commissioner of the Connecticut Department of Motor Vehicles, and as Auditor of Public Accounts. He died from kidney failure in 2021.

== Early life and education ==
Robert M. Ward was born on November 8, 1952, to Richard Ward and Joan Minnick. He was raised in Derby, Connecticut, and graduated from Notre Dame High School in 1970. He attended the University of Kentucky for one year before graduating cum laude with a Bachelor of Arts degree from the University of Connecticut in 1974. He graduated from the University of Cincinnati with a Juris Doctor in 1978, and was admitted to the Connecticut bar. He was married to Anita Siena for forty-seven years. He was a member of the Honorable Order of Kentucky Colonels.

== Career ==
=== Politics ===
Ward worked as an intern for Herbert V. Camp Jr., the chair of the finance committee in the Connecticut state legislature, while a senior at the University of Connecticut. He later worked as Camp's campaign coordinator for Camp's United States Senate committee in 1974. He served as the clerk of the judiciary committee in 1975. Ward became a member of the North Branford Republican Town Committee and was selected as North Branford's Jaycee of the year in 1980. He served as president of the North Branford Jaycees in 1982.

=== Elections ===
Ward ran for the Republican nomination for a seat in the Connecticut House of Representatives from the 86th district and won the Republican nomination at the convention, but was defeated by incumbent Democratic Representative Dorothy McCluskey. He ran again in the 86th district during the 1982 election, but was defeated by Timothy P. Ryan. He won the Republican nomination again by unanimity for the 86th district in 1984, and defeated Ryan after raising $1,420 against Ryan's $2,800.

In 1986, Ward won renomination by the Republican Party with a unanimous vote at the convention and defeated Democratic nominee Joan Fitch in the general election. He won renomination with a unanimous vote in 1988, and defeated Democratic nominee Ryan in the general election after spending $6,505 against Ryan's $1,619 and spending $2,546 against Ryan's $79. He won renomination with a unanimous vote in 1990, and defeated Democratic nominee Peter Serletti in the general election after spending $2,422 against Serletti's $1,158. Ward defeated the Democratic and A Connecticut Party nominee Colin D. Johnson in the 1992 election. He defeated Democratic nominee Paul Burns in the 1994 election. He won reelection without opposition in 1996, 2000, and 2002. He defeated Democratic nominee Peter Serletti in the 1998 election. He defeated Democratic nominee Ashley Clow Joiner in the 2004 election.

Ward announced that he would not seek reelection to the Connecticut House of Representatives in 2006, and was succeeded by Republican Vincent Candelora.

=== Tenure ===
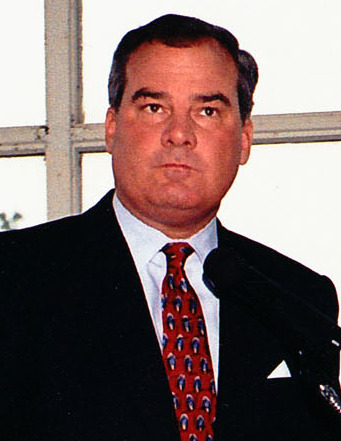
Ward initially opposed calls for Governor John G. Rowland to resign or be impeached, but later came out in support of an investigatory committee and called his refusal to testify an affront.

Ward was selected to serve on the transportation and education committees in 1984. Ward was appointed to serve as a member of the twenty-five member Commission on Quality and Integrated Education by the governor in 1989. He was selected to serve as assistant Minority Leader in 1991, and later as deputy Minority Leader. Ward was selected to replace Edward C. Karwiecki, who was retiring, as Minority Leader in 1994.

Ward endorsed United States Senate Minority Leader Bob Dole for president during the 1988 Republican presidential primary. He endorsed Dole for president again during the 1996 Republican presidential primary and served as vice-chair of Dole's campaign in Connecticut alongside Senate President Pro Tem M. Adela Eads. He served as a delegate for Dole to the Republican National Convention. In 1999, Governor John G. Rowland endorsed Governor George W. Bush for president and fifty out of fifty-three Republicans in the state house, including Ward, and fourteen out of seventeen Republicans in the state senate sent a letter urging Bush to run for president. Ward and Chris DePino, the Chairman of the Connecticut Republican Party, led a five-member delegation to Texas to urge Bush to run for president.

In 2003, Rowland revealed that he had lied when he stated that he and his wife had paid for improvements to their summer home and that it was actually paid for by state employees and contractors, including the Tomasso Group, instead. There were calls for his resignation or impeachment following his admission. Ward initially stated that calls for Rowland's resignation were inappropriate and later made another statement with Senate Minority Leader Louis DeLuca that Rowland's resignation or impeachment was not warranted. However, he came out in support of an investigatory committee while talking to Speaker of the House Moira K. Lyons. Ward later stated that polling showing that a majority of Republicans wanting Rowland to resign was a reinforcement of the state house's unanimous vote to open an impeachment investigation against Rowland. Ward stated that Rowland's refusal to testify was "an affront to the General Assembly. It also is an affront to the people of Connecticut". Rowland announced his resignation on June 22, which took effect on July 1, after the Connecticut Supreme Court ruled five to two against him in a case regarding the state house impeachment committee's authority to compel his testimony.

Ward was selected as the most effective legislator in 1994 and 1996, and was selected as the most admired legislator in 1996. Ward was awarded "Leader of the Year" in 1997, by the National Republican Legislators Association after being nominated by Lieutenant Governor Jodi Rell. The National Conference of State Legislatures awarded him the "Excellence in State Legislative Leadership" in 2004. He was given the Prescott Bush Award by the Connecticut Republican Party in 2006.

== Later life ==
Ward was a member of the University of Connecticut Board of Trustees from 2007 to 2010. Governor Rell appointed him to serve as the 3rd Commissioner of the Connecticut Department of Motor Vehicles in 2007, after he left the state legislature and he served for four years. Ward served as co-chair of a task force alongside Commissioner of Connecticut Department of Public Health Robert Galvin in 2007, that looked into ways to make teenagers drive more safely. He was appointed as the Auditor of Public Accounts by the Connecticut General Assembly in 2011, and served until 2016.

Ward received a kidney transplant from his brother in 2009, and it lasted until 2019. After the kidney failed Ward started using home dialysis and died on May 9, 2021, in North Branford, Connecticut.

== Political positions ==
=== Crime ===
Ward proposed leasing prison cells in Oregon so that Connecticut could send some of its prisoners there to alleviate prison overcrowding in 1991. The state house voted 91 to 54, with Ward voting in favor, in favor of increasing the ways that courts can use the death penalty against murderers in 1991. Following the September 11 attacks Ward called for the state legislature to pass legislation to increase the penalties for making a false threat regarding explosive, chemical, or biological attacks.

=== Economics ===
In 1991, the state house voted 84 to 62, with Ward against, against an amendment favored by Governor Lowell Weicker, which would have banned charitable Las Vegas nights which would have prohibited the Mashantucket Pequot Tribe from opening a casino. He opposed the creation of a state income tax. In 2005, he proposed legislation which would protect fast-food restaurants from lawsuits blaming them for obesity.

=== Sexuality and gay rights ===
Ward attempted to raise the age of consent from fifteen to seventeen in 1984, but his legislation failed in a voice vote. However, another bill by Ward to raise the age of consent from fifteen to sixteen was passed by a vote of 125 to 21 in the state house. Ward voted in favor of legislation which would have banned the usage of Medicaid funds for abortion.

Ward voted against legislation that would have prohibited discrimination against gay people in 1989. In 1989, the state house voted 115 to 29, with Ward voting in favor, against legislation that would have required couples to take an AIDS test before receiving a marriage license. Ward voted in favor of removing sexual orientation from hate crime legislation in 1990. The state house voted 81 to 65, with Ward voting against, in favor of legislation which would prohibit discrimination against gay people in credit, housing, public accommodation, and in the workplace.

In 2005, the state house voted 85 to 63, with Ward voting in favor, in favor of legislation which would recognize civil unions for gay couples and the legislation was later approved by the state senate by a vote of 27 to 9. However, the legislation had an amendment which stated that marriage was between one man and one woman.

== Electoral history ==
1980 Connecticut House of Representatives 86th district election
Party	Candidate	Votes	%
Democratic	Dorothy McCluskey (incumbent)	5,924	56.39%
Republican	Robert Ward	4,582	43.61%
Total votes		10,506	100.00%

1982 Connecticut House of Representatives 86th district election
Party	Candidate	Votes	%
Democratic	Timothy P. Ryan	3,636	54.35%
Republican	Robert Ward	3,054	45.65%
Total votes		6,690	100.00%

1984 Connecticut House of Representatives 86th district election
Party	Candidate	Votes	%
Republican	Robert Ward	5,600	60.59%
Democratic	Timothy P. Ryan (incumbent)	3,642	39.41%
Total votes		9,242	100.00%

1986 Connecticut House of Representatives 86th district election
Party	Candidate	Votes	%
Republican	Robert Ward (incumbent)	3,277	50.58%
Democratic	Joan Fitch	3,202	49.42%
Total votes		6,479	100.00%

1988 Connecticut House of Representatives 86th district election
Party	Candidate	Votes	%
Republican	Robert Ward (incumbent)	5,516	58.38%
Democratic	Timothy P. Ryan	3,932	41.62%
Total votes		9,448	100.00%

1990 Connecticut House of Representatives 86th district election
Party	Candidate	Votes	%
Republican	Robert Ward (incumbent)	5,246	70.04%
Democratic	Peter Serletti	2,244	29.96%
Total votes		7,490	100.00%

1992 Connecticut House of Representatives 86th district election
Party	Candidate	Votes	%
Republican	Robert Ward (incumbent)	5,620	62.84%
Democratic	Colin D. Johnson	2,481	27.74%
A Connecticut Party (1990)	Colin D. Johnson	842	9.42%
Total	Colin D. Johnson	3,323	37.16%
Total votes		8,943	100.00%

1994 Connecticut House of Representatives 86th district election
Party	Candidate	Votes	%
Republican	Robert Ward (incumbent)	4,321	65.71%
Democratic	Paul Burns	2,255	34.29%
Total votes		6,576	100.00%

1996 Connecticut House of Representatives 86th district election
Party	Candidate	Votes	%
Republican	Robert Ward (incumbent)	5,077	100.00%
Total votes		5,077	100.00%

1998 Connecticut House of Representatives 86th district election
Party	Candidate	Votes	%
Republican	Robert Ward (incumbent)	4,126	67.18%
Democratic	Peter Serletti	2,016	32.82%
Total votes		6,142	100.00%

2000 Connecticut House of Representatives 86th district election
Party	Candidate	Votes	%
Republican	Robert Ward (incumbent)	5,211	100.00%
Total votes		5,211	100.00%

2002 Connecticut House of Representatives 86th district election
Party	Candidate	Votes	%
Republican	Robert Ward (incumbent)	3,948	100.00%
Total votes		3,948	100.00%

2004 Connecticut House of Representatives 86th district election
Party	Candidate	Votes	%
Republican	Robert Ward (incumbent)	5,382	56.98%
Democratic	Ashley Clow Joiner	4,064	43.02%
Total votes		9,446	100.00%
