= Connecticut State Capitol Police =

- Abbreviation: SCPD
- Motto: "Protecting Democracy"

Agency overview
- Formed: 1974
- Employees: 56

Jurisdictional structure
- Operations jurisdiction: U.S.
- Legal jurisdiction: State Capitol, Old State House, and the Legislative Office Building.
- General nature: Civilian police

Operational structure
- Headquarters: 300 Capitol Avenue, Hartford, Connecticut, United States
- Agency executive: Luiz Casanova, Chief

Website
- www.cga.ct.gov/cop/default.asp

The Connecticut State Capitol Police is the law enforcement agency responsible for the 17-acre (69,000 m^{2}) Connecticut State Capitol complex in Hartford, Connecticut. A Chief of Police oversees the agency, which employed 30 officers as of 2026.

Capitol Police Officers are responsible for law enforcement operations at the State Capitol, Old State House, and the Legislative Office Building.

== History ==
In 1974, the Connecticut State Legislature created the "Office of the State Capitol Police". The operations of the State Capitol Police were supervised by the Connecticut State Police under the direction of the Joint Committee of Legislative Management, until 1996 when the Legislature reorganized the department as an independent police agency. The State Capitol Police Department maintains statewide jurisdiction and arrest powers to accommodate the diverse nature of their work.

The State Capitol Police Department received accreditation by the Commission on Accreditation for Law Enforcement Agencies (CALEA) on March 22, 2003. Officers are required to meet and maintain police officer certification standards as mandated by state law and regulated by the Connecticut Police Officer Standards and Training Council.

== Rank structure and insignia ==
Title	Insignia
Police Chief	
Lieutenant	
Sergeant	
Corporal	
Officer First Class	
Police Officer	

== See also ==
- List of law enforcement agencies in Connecticut
- Connecticut General Assembly
- Connecticut State Capitol
