= Vehicle registration plates of Connecticut =

Connecticut vehicle license plates

Connecticut
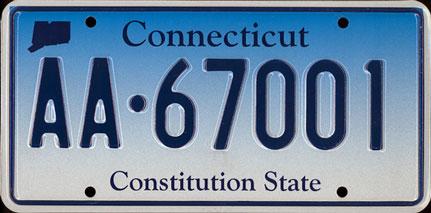

Current series
- Slogan: Constitution State
- Size: 12 in × 6 in 30 cm × 15 cm
- Material: Aluminum
- Serial format: AB·12345 (2015-present); 1AB·CD2 (2013-2015); 1ABCD2 (2013); 123·ABC (2000-2013)
- Introduced: January 1, 2000

Availability
- Issued by: Connecticut Department of Motor Vehicles

History
- First issued: September 1, 1905 (pre-state plates from 1903 through August 31, 1905)

The U.S. state of Connecticut first required its residents to register their motor vehicles in 1903. Registrants provided their own license plates for display until 1905, when the state began to issue plates. Since then, Connecticut has used a variety of license plate designs, and has issued different designs for passenger, non-passenger, and, more recently, optional plate types that often require an additional fee. As of 2026, plates are issued by the Connecticut Department of Motor Vehicles.

For most classes of vehicles, plates are issued in pairs, for the front and rear of the vehicle respectively, though single rear plates were issued between 1980 and 1987. Plates were validated with metal date tabs from 1937 through 1963, then with plate stickers until 2006, and finally with windshield stickers until 2010. Plate stickers continue to be used on plates for vehicles that do not have a windshield, or are part of fleets that frequently rotate plates among vehicles. All issues (including re-issues) since 2000 are currently valid.

Until 2013 Connecticut, as a rule, skipped the number 0 as the leading digit in its plates, with the exception of dealer plates. Between July 2013 and August 2015, temporary 1ABCD2 and 1AB-CD2 serial formats were used, both of which allowed 0 to be used as the leading digit. In August 2015, a permanent AB-12345 serial format was introduced, and the number 0 could be used as the first of the five digits in the serial.

== Passenger baseplates ==
=== 1905 to 1936 ===
Image	Dates issued	Description	Serial format	Serials issued	Notes
	1905–09	White serial on black porcelain plate	C1234	C1 to C9999	Each serial was specific to the motorist, rather than to an individual plate (so if the motorist owned more than one vehicle, the plates on each would display the same serial). Annual re-registration commenced 1907.
	1910	White serial on red porcelain plate	C12345	C1 to approximately C11400	
	1911	Blue serial on white porcelain plate	C12345	C1 to approximately C14000	
	1912	White serial on green porcelain plate	C12345	C1 to approximately C17700	
	1913	White serial on blue porcelain plate	C12345	C1 to approximately C21800	
	1914	White serial on green porcelain plate; vertical "CONN" and "1914" at left and right respectively	12345	1 to approximately 25000	First dated plate.
	1915	Yellow serial on black porcelain plate; vertical "CONN" and "1915" at left and right respectively	12345	1 to approximately 34000	
	1916	White serial on black porcelain plate; vertical "CONN" and "1916" at left and right respectively	12345	1 to approximately 49000	
	1917	Dark blue serial on white flat metal plate; vertical "CONN" and "1917" on dark blue bands at left and right respectively	12345	1 to approximately 62000	
	1918	Dark green serial on white flat metal plate; vertical "CONN" and "1918" on dark green bands at left and right respectively	12-345	1 to approximately 70-000	
	1919	Black serial on white flat metal plate; "CONN. 1919" centered at bottom	12-345	1 to approximately 83-000	
	1920	Embossed blue serial on white plate with border line; "CONN.–1920" centered at bottom	12-345	1 to approximately 99-000	First embossed plate.
	1921	Embossed yellow serial on black plate with border line; "CONN.–1921" centered at bottom	123-456	1 to approximately 110–000	
	1922	Embossed maroon serial on white plate with border line; "CONN.–1922" centered at bottom	123-456	1 to approximately 125–000	
	1923	Embossed white serial on dark green plate; "CONN. 1923" centered at bottom	123-456	1 to approximately 157–000	
	1924	Embossed black serial on gray plate; "CONN. 1924" centered at bottom	12-345	1 to approximately 98-000	Letter prefixes introduced to keep the width of plates down. These were assigned to branch offices as follows: A, E and Y to New Haven; F, H and S to Bridgeport; K and V to Waterbury; N and L to New London; and P and Z to Hartford.
	1924	Embossed black serial on gray plate; "CONN. 1924" centered at bottom	A-1234	Coded by branch office	Letter prefixes introduced to keep the width of plates down. These were assigned to branch offices as follows: A, E and Y to New Haven; F, H and S to Bridgeport; K and V to Waterbury; N and L to New London; and P and Z to Hartford.
	1925	Embossed white serial on navy blue plate; "CONN. 1925" centered at bottom	123-456	1 to approximately 104–000	
	1925	Embossed white serial on navy blue plate; "CONN. 1925" centered at bottom	A-1234	Coded by branch office	
	1926	Embossed black serial on yellow plate; "CONN. 1926" centered at bottom	123-456	1 to approximately 112–000	
	1926	Embossed black serial on yellow plate; "CONN. 1926" centered at bottom	A-12-345	Coded by branch office	
	1927	Embossed white serial on maroon plate; "CONN. 1927" centered at bottom	123-456	1 to approximately 118–000	'S' prefix reassigned to Stamford.
	1927	Embossed white serial on maroon plate; "CONN. 1927" centered at bottom	A-12-345	Coded by branch office	'S' prefix reassigned to Stamford.
	1928	Embossed white serial on navy blue plate; "CONN. 1928" centered at bottom	123-456	1 to approximately 128–000	
	1928	Embossed white serial on navy blue plate; "CONN. 1928" centered at bottom	A-12-345	Coded by branch office	
	1929	As 1927 base, but with "CONN. 1929" at bottom	123-456	1 to approximately 135–000	
	1929	As 1927 base, but with "CONN. 1929" at bottom	A-12-345	Coded by branch office	
	1930	As 1928 base, but with "CONN. 1930" at bottom	123-456	1 to approximately 133–000	'Y' prefix reassigned to Danbury.
	1930	As 1928 base, but with "CONN. 1930" at bottom	A-12-345	Coded by branch office	'Y' prefix reassigned to Danbury.
	1931	As 1927 base, but with "CONN. 1931" at bottom	123-456	1 to approximately 137–000	
	1931	As 1927 base, but with "CONN. 1931" at bottom	A-12-345	Coded by branch office	
	1932	Embossed white serial on navy blue plate; "CONN. 1932" at bottom	1234	Issued in blocks by branch office	All plates were 6 inches (15 cm) in height by 9 1/4 inches (23 cm) in width; this practice continued through 1956. Plates with the A/B123 serial format had the state abbreviation and year offset to the right; this practice continued through 1936.
	1932	Embossed white serial on navy blue plate; "CONN. 1932" at bottom	A123	Issued in blocks by branch office	All plates were 6 inches (15 cm) in height by 9 1/4 inches (23 cm) in width; this practice continued through 1956. Plates with the A/B123 serial format had the state abbreviation and year offset to the right; this practice continued through 1936.
	1932	Embossed white serial on navy blue plate; "CONN. 1932" at bottom	A/B123	Issued in blocks by branch office	All plates were 6 inches (15 cm) in height by 9 1/4 inches (23 cm) in width; this practice continued through 1956. Plates with the A/B123 serial format had the state abbreviation and year offset to the right; this practice continued through 1936.
	1933	Embossed white serial on maroon plate; "CONN. 1933" at bottom	1234	Issued in blocks by branch office	
	1933	Embossed white serial on maroon plate; "CONN. 1933" at bottom	A123	Issued in blocks by branch office	
	1933	Embossed white serial on maroon plate; "CONN. 1933" at bottom	A/B123	Issued in blocks by branch office	
	1934	As 1932 base, but with "CONN. 1934" at bottom	1234	Issued in blocks by branch office	
	1934	As 1932 base, but with "CONN. 1934" at bottom	A123	Issued in blocks by branch office	
	1934	As 1932 base, but with "CONN. 1934" at bottom	A/B123	Issued in blocks by branch office	
	1935	As 1933 base, but with "CONN. 1935" at bottom	1234	Issued in blocks by branch office	
	1935	As 1933 base, but with "CONN. 1935" at bottom	A123	Issued in blocks by branch office	
	1935	As 1933 base, but with "CONN. 1935" at bottom	A/B123	Issued in blocks by branch office	
	1936	Embossed yellow serial on navy blue plate; "CONN. 1936" at bottom	1234	Issued in blocks by branch office	
	1936	Embossed yellow serial on navy blue plate; "CONN. 1936" at bottom	A123	Issued in blocks by branch office	
	1936	Embossed yellow serial on navy blue plate; "CONN. 1936" at bottom	A/B123	Issued in blocks by branch office	

=== 1937 to 1956 ===
Image	Dates issued	Description	Serial format	Serials issued	Notes
	1937–41	Embossed black serial on silver plate; vertical "CONN" at right; tab box at bottom center	1234	1 to 9999	Validated for 1937, 1940 and 1943 with yellow tabs; for 1938, 1941 and 1946 with silver tabs; for 1939, 1942, 1945 and 1947 with light green tabs; and for 1944 with white tabs. In the A/1 123 serial format, the letter progressed before the small number (A/2 through Z/2, then A/3 through Z/3, etc.).
	1937–41	Embossed black serial on silver plate; vertical "CONN" at right; tab box at bottom center	A/ 123	A/ 1 to Z/ 999	Validated for 1937, 1940 and 1943 with yellow tabs; for 1938, 1941 and 1946 with silver tabs; for 1939, 1942, 1945 and 1947 with light green tabs; and for 1944 with white tabs. In the A/1 123 serial format, the letter progressed before the small number (A/2 through Z/2, then A/3 through Z/3, etc.).
	1937–41	Embossed black serial on silver plate; vertical "CONN" at right; tab box at bottom center	A/B 123	A/A 1 to Z/Z 999	Validated for 1937, 1940 and 1943 with yellow tabs; for 1938, 1941 and 1946 with silver tabs; for 1939, 1942, 1945 and 1947 with light green tabs; and for 1944 with white tabs. In the A/1 123 serial format, the letter progressed before the small number (A/2 through Z/2, then A/3 through Z/3, etc.).
	1941–46	Embossed black serial on silver plate; vertical "CONN" at right; tab box at bottom center	1/A 123	2/A 1 to 8/Z 999	Validated for 1937, 1940 and 1943 with yellow tabs; for 1938, 1941 and 1946 with silver tabs; for 1939, 1942, 1945 and 1947 with light green tabs; and for 1944 with white tabs. In the A/1 123 serial format, the letter progressed before the small number (A/2 through Z/2, then A/3 through Z/3, etc.).
	1946–47	As above, but with border line	1/A 123	9/A 1 to 9/Z 999	Validated for 1937, 1940 and 1943 with yellow tabs; for 1938, 1941 and 1946 with silver tabs; for 1939, 1942, 1945 and 1947 with light green tabs; and for 1944 with white tabs. In the A/1 123 serial format, the letter progressed before the small number (A/2 through Z/2, then A/3 through Z/3, etc.).
	1947	As above, but with border line	A/1 123	A/2 100 to approximately Y/3 999	Validated for 1937, 1940 and 1943 with yellow tabs; for 1938, 1941 and 1946 with silver tabs; for 1939, 1942, 1945 and 1947 with light green tabs; and for 1944 with white tabs. In the A/1 123 serial format, the letter progressed before the small number (A/2 through Z/2, then A/3 through Z/3, etc.).
	1948–51	Embossed black serial on reflective aluminum plate with border line; "CT" at bottom right; tab box at bottom center	1234	1 to 9999	Validated for 1948, 1951 and 1954 with yellow tabs; for 1949 and 1952 with silver tabs; for 1950 and 1955 with light green tabs; and for 1953 and 1956 with red tabs.
	1948–51	Embossed black serial on reflective aluminum plate with border line; "CT" at bottom right; tab box at bottom center	A/ 123	A/ 1 to Z/ 999	Validated for 1948, 1951 and 1954 with yellow tabs; for 1949 and 1952 with silver tabs; for 1950 and 1955 with light green tabs; and for 1953 and 1956 with red tabs.
	1948–51	Embossed black serial on reflective aluminum plate with border line; "CT" at bottom right; tab box at bottom center	A/B 123	A/A 1 to Z/Z 999	Validated for 1948, 1951 and 1954 with yellow tabs; for 1949 and 1952 with silver tabs; for 1950 and 1955 with light green tabs; and for 1953 and 1956 with red tabs.
	1948–51	Embossed black serial on reflective aluminum plate with border line; "CT" at bottom right; tab box at bottom center	1/A 123	2/A 1 to 9/Z 999	Validated for 1948, 1951 and 1954 with yellow tabs; for 1949 and 1952 with silver tabs; for 1950 and 1955 with light green tabs; and for 1953 and 1956 with red tabs.
	1951–53	Embossed black serial on reflective aluminum plate with border line; "CT" at bottom right; tab box at bottom center	A/1 123	A/2 100 to Z/9 999	Validated for 1948, 1951 and 1954 with yellow tabs; for 1949 and 1952 with silver tabs; for 1950 and 1955 with light green tabs; and for 1953 and 1956 with red tabs.
	1953–54	As above, but with narrower dies	12345	10000 to 99999	Validated for 1948, 1951 and 1954 with yellow tabs; for 1949 and 1952 with silver tabs; for 1950 and 1955 with light green tabs; and for 1953 and 1956 with red tabs.
	1954	As above, but non-reflective aluminum	A/B 1234	A/A 1000 to A/C 9999	Validated for 1948, 1951 and 1954 with yellow tabs; for 1949 and 1952 with silver tabs; for 1950 and 1955 with light green tabs; and for 1953 and 1956 with red tabs.
	1954–56	As above, but with "CONN" at bottom right	A/B 1234	A/D 1000 to approximately B/B 6000	Validated for 1948, 1951 and 1954 with yellow tabs; for 1949 and 1952 with silver tabs; for 1950 and 1955 with light green tabs; and for 1953 and 1956 with red tabs.

=== 1957 to present ===
In 1956, the United States, Canada, and Mexico came to an agreement with the American Association of Motor Vehicle Administrators, the Automobile Manufacturers Association and the National Safety Council that standardized the size for license plates for vehicles (except those for motorcycles) at 6 inches (15 cm) in height by 12 inches (30 cm) in width, with standardized mounting holes. The 1956 (dated 1957) issue was the first Connecticut license plate that complied with these standards.

Plates continued to be validated with tabs each year through 1960. Monthly staggered registration commenced in 1961; tabs were used for expirations from May 1962 through February 1963, and stickers thereafter.

The "Constitution State" slogan was first used on the 1974 blue-on-white base. This base did not hold up well and was discontinued in 1976; remaining plates were recalled in 1990 and replaced with white-on-blue plates bearing the same serials.

From 1980 through 1987, only rear plates were issued as a cost-saving measure. When front plates became mandatory again in 1987, the design of the 1976 white-on-blue base was changed in order to distinguish between plates issued in pairs and rear-only plates, with a state shape added in the top left corner and the "Constitution State" slogan moved from the top to the bottom.

The current sky blue base was introduced in January 2000. Between September 2000 and August 2002, all remaining 1957–74 and 1976–99 plates were replaced with plates on this base bearing the same serials. Hence, serials issued in 1957 can be seen on the current base.

Plate stickers continued to be issued through August 2006 (the last being used for August 2008 expirations). From September 2006 through July 2010, windshield stickers were used instead (the last being used for July 2012 expirations); these were discontinued after the Connecticut Department of Motor Vehicles began allowing police agencies to use license plate scanners to verify registrations.

The older 123·ABC format was in use from 1980 to 2013 - on both the 1976 and 2000 bases. After its exhaustion, the 1ABCD2 and 1AB·CD2 formats were used, until a computer upgrade was completed in 2015. Since then, Connecticut has used the seven-character AB·12345 format, beginning from AA·00001. Plates progressed to the current "B" series in 2020.

Image	Dates issued	Description	Slogan	Serial format	Serials issued	Notes
	1957	Embossed white serial on blue plate with border line; "CONNECTICUT" at bottom, offset to left	none	12345	1 to 99999	In the two-letter serial formats, serials with C or D as the first letter were reserved for Combination and Used Dealer plates respectively.
	1957	Embossed white serial on blue plate with border line; "CONNECTICUT" at bottom, offset to left	none	AB 123	AA 1 to ZZ 999	In the two-letter serial formats, serials with C or D as the first letter were reserved for Combination and Used Dealer plates respectively.
	1957	Embossed white serial on blue plate with border line; "CONNECTICUT" at bottom, offset to left	none	AB1234	AA1000 to BH9999	In the two-letter serial formats, serials with C or D as the first letter were reserved for Combination and Used Dealer plates respectively.
	1958–66	Embossed white serial on blue plate with border line; "CONNECTICUT" at bottom, offset to left	none	123·456	100·000 to 999·999	In the two-letter serial formats, serials with C or D as the first letter were reserved for Combination and Used Dealer plates respectively.
	1966–74	Embossed white serial on blue plate with border line; "CONNECTICUT" at bottom, offset to left	none	AB·1234	BJ·1000 to NZ·9999; ZA·1000 to ZF·9999	In the two-letter serial formats, serials with C or D as the first letter were reserved for Combination and Used Dealer plates respectively.
	1974–76	Embossed blue serial on reflective white plate with border line; "CONNECTICUT" centered at bottom	"CONSTITUTION STATE" centered at top	AB·1234^{1}	PA·1000 to approximately TP·4999	
	1976–80	Embossed reflective (glass-beaded) white serial on blue plate with border line; "CONNECTICUT" centered at bottom	"CONSTITUTION STATE" at top	AB·1234^{1}	TP·5000 to YZ·9999; ZG·1000 to ZZ·9999	
	1980–87	Embossed reflective (glass-beaded) white serial on blue plate with border line; "CONNECTICUT" centered at bottom	"CONSTITUTION STATE" at top	123·ABC^{1}	100·AAA to 999·EVX	Letters I and Q not used in this serial format. 'C' series reserved for Combination plates.
	1987 – December 1999	Similar to above, but with "CONNECTICUT" at top and embossed state shape at top left	"CONSTITUTION STATE" at bottom	123·ABC^{1}	100·EVY to 999·NZM	'L' series reserved for optional Preserve the Sound plates.
	January 2000 – June; 2013	Embossed dark blue serial on reflective gradient sky blue and white plate with dark blue border line; "Connecticut" screened in dark blue centered at top; screened dark blue state shape at top left	"Constitution State" screened in dark blue centered at bottom	123·ABC^{2}	100·NZN to 999·ZZX	'O' series not used; 'V' series reserved for Veteran plates.
	June – December 2013	Embossed dark blue serial on reflective gradient sky blue and white plate with dark blue border line; "Connecticut" screened in dark blue centered at top; screened dark blue state shape at top left	"Constitution State" screened in dark blue centered at bottom	1ABCD2	0AAAA0 to 9AGGX9	Temporary serial formats used until the completion of a computer upgrade to allow standard seven-character serials (below). Initial 1ABCD2 format revised with addition of dot separator in response to visibility concerns. Letters C, I, Q, Y and Z not used in either format; O used in the 1ABCD2 format but not in the 1AB·CD2 format.
	December 2013 – August 2015	Embossed dark blue serial on reflective gradient sky blue and white plate with dark blue border line; "Connecticut" screened in dark blue centered at top; screened dark blue state shape at top left	"Constitution State" screened in dark blue centered at bottom	1AB·CD2	0AG·HA0 to 9AX·XX9	Temporary serial formats used until the completion of a computer upgrade to allow standard seven-character serials (below). Initial 1ABCD2 format revised with addition of dot separator in response to visibility concerns. Letters C, I, Q, Y and Z not used in either format; O used in the 1ABCD2 format but not in the 1AB·CD2 format.
	August 2015 – present	Embossed dark blue serial on reflective gradient sky blue and white plate with dark blue border line; "Connecticut" screened in dark blue centered at top; screened dark blue state shape at top left	"Constitution State" screened in dark blue centered at bottom	AB·12345	AA·00001 to BW·99865 (as of October 31, 2025)	Standard seven-character serials introduced following the completion of the aforementioned computer upgrade. Letters I, O, and Q not used.

Notes

- 1 Plus remakes of serials issued on previous bases: 123–456 and AB-1234 formats
- 1 Plus remakes of serials issued on previous bases: 123–456, AB-1234, and 123-ABC formats (serials from 100-AAA to 999-NZM)
- 2 Plus remakes of serials issued on previous bases: 123–456, AB-1234, and 123-ABC formats (serials from 100-AAA to 999-NZM)

== Current plate types ==
=== Non-passenger types ===
A number of non-passenger types now use the AB·12345 serial format introduced on passenger plates in 2015.

Image	Type	Design	Serial format	Notes
	All Terrain	As Motorcycle plate, but with "All Terrain" at bottom	G·1234	This type probably started in the 1970s. Used on off-road recreational vehicles.
	Amateur Radio	As passenger base, with lightning bolt used as separator	FCC call sign	This type started in the mid-1950s.
	Ambulance	As passenger base, but with "Ambulance" in place of slogan	1234	
	Apportioned	As passenger base, but with red serial and border line, and "Apportioned" in place of slogan	12345·A	This type appears to have started in the mid-1980s, from 1000·A.
	Bus	As passenger base, but with "Bus" in place of slogan	1234; AB·12345	
	Camp Trailer	As passenger base, but with "Camp Tr." in place of slogan	123·456; AB·12345	This type started in 1924. Used on private trailers.
	Camper	As passenger base, but with "Camper" in place of slogan	12345; 123·456	This type started in 1969.
	Classic Motorcycle	Blue on white	1234	Used on collectable motorcycles that are at least 20 years old. Previously "Early American," black on white.
	Classic Vehicle	Blue on white	00·ABCD	Used on collectable vehicles (except motorcycles) that are at least 20 years old. Previously "Early American," black on white. The earliest of the "Early American" plates were issued in 1952. These were porcelain plates, black on a white background. Original sequence of 12345 was replaced by 1A·123 format, which carried over after the black on white design was changed to the new blue on white on March 29, 2014. 00·ABCD serial format introduced 2015; shared with standard Motorcycle plates.
	Combination	"Constitution State" legend; "COMB" embossed vertically at right. This type started in 1922, with the same size, colors and format as regular passenger plates but with a 'C' prefix.	C·123456	Previously CA·1234, C·12345, 12345, 123·CAB, 1C·2345, 12C·345 on past bases remade on the current base; 12345·C, 1CA·234, 12C·A34, 1234·CA, and 1234·DA on the current base.
	Combination – Handicapped	"Constitution State" legend. Wheelchair embossed to right of serial; "COMB" embossed vertically to right of wheelchair.	123·R; 123·S; 123·T	
	Commercial	As passenger base, but with red serial and border line, and vertical "COMM" embossed to left of serial	A·12345; AB·12345	
	Connecticut News Photographer	"Constitution State" legend.	12·C/N/P	
	Construction	As passenger base, but with red serial and border line, and "Construction" in place of slogan	1234	This type probably started in the late 1960s or early 1970s. Generally used on construction vehicles with little or no highway use.
	Factory	As passenger base, but with red serial and border line, and "Factory" in place of slogan	1234	This type started in the mid-1920s.
	Farm	As passenger base, but with red serial and border line, and "Farm" in place of slogan	12345	This type started in 1933.
	Fire Apparatus	As passenger base, but with red serial and border line, and "Fire Apparatus" in place of slogan	1234	This type started circa 1963.
	Handicapped	As passenger base	123·A; 1234·Z; 1234·Y	
	Hearse	As passenger base, but with "Hearse" in place of slogan	U·123; U·8123; AB·12345	This type started in the mid-1920s; the 'U' prefix was for "undertaker".
	Interstate	As passenger base, but with "Interstate" in place of slogan	Z1234Z	
	Livery	As passenger base, but with "Livery" in place of slogan	L1234L	This type started in 1910. Used on limousines and for-hire cars, but not taxis.
	Medal of Honor		1	
	Medical Doctor		MD·1234	MD·0001 to MD·0999 followed MD·1000 to MD·9999
	Motorcycle	Similar to passenger base, with "Conn" at top and "Motorcycle" at bottom	123·456; 00·ABCD	00·ABCD serial format introduced 2015; shared with Classic Vehicle plates.
	Motorcycle – Handicapped	As standard Motorcycle plate	123·M; 123·N	
	Municipal	As passenger base, but with "Municipal" in place of slogan	1·AB; 12·AB; 123·AB; 1·ABC; 12·ABC; 123·ABC	This type started in the mid-1970s. Used on town/city government vehicles, including police cars and dump trucks. The letters in the serial indicate the municipality.
	Municipal – Preserve the Sound	Uses a "MUNICIPAL CT" sticker in place of validation sticker.	1·AB; 12·AB; 123·AB; 1·ABC; 12·ABC; 123·ABC	Letters signify municipality.
	New York Press	As passenger base	NYP·123	Used by news reporters to park in Working Press zones in New York City.
	Official		1	
	School Bus	Gradient sky blue and white with school bus graphic at left; "CONNECTICUT" at top and "SCHOOL BUS" at bottom	S1234S; 12A34; AB·12345	School buses used Service Bus plates prior to the mid-1990s. In the 12A34 serial format, the letter progressed S, A, B.
	School Bus/Livery Bus	As School Bus plate, but with "SCHOOL BUS/LIVERY BUS" at bottom	1SL23	
	Service Bus	As passenger base, but with "Service Bus" in place of slogan	12345	This type started sometime in the 1940s. Used on private transportation vehicles that carry persons without charge. Until the mid-1990s, these included school buses.
	Snowmobile	As Motorcycle plate, but with "Snowmobile" at bottom	12345	This type started in 1969.
	State Service Bus		123; AB·12345	This type started sometime in the 1970s. Plates are typically used on buses belonging to the State Vocational schools, the State University system, and prisoner transport buses.
	Taxi	As passenger base, but with "Taxi" in place of slogan	T1234T	This type started in 1931.
	Trailer	As passenger base, but with red serial and border line, and "Trailer" in place of slogan	V·12345; W·12345; AB·12345	This type probably started in the early 1930s. Used on commercial trailers.
	Transporter	Embossed maroon serial on yellow plate with border line; embossed state shape and "CONNECTICUT" at top; "TRANS." at bottom	1234	This type probably started in the late 1940s. Has a variety of uses, including for the movement of unregistered vehicles for the purposes of inspection or sale, and on vehicles being repossessed.
	Vanpool	As passenger base, but with "Vanpool" in place of slogan	1234	This type started in 1980. Used on carpool commuter vans.
	Wrecker	Embossed black serial on orange plate with border line; embossed state shape and "CONNECTICUT" at top; "WRECKER" at bottom	12345; AB·12345	This type started circa 1954.

=== Optional issues ===
Image	Type	Design	Serial format	Notes
	Optional Issues – Passenger		123·ABC; 1ABC2	Types confirmed as using 1ABC2 format: Blue Knights, Combat Wounded, Ducks Unlimited, Fraternal Order of Police, Garden Clubs, Greenways, Laos War Veteran, Meriden, Norwich, Olympic Spirit, Silent Service, UCONN. Letters I, O, and Q are used in any letter position. Elks previously used 123-ELK; UCONN 1999 NCAA National Champions: 123·PEP; Olympic Spirit: 123·WIN; Penn State University: 123·PSU.
	Special issues – Combination		1CAB2	
	Candlewood Lake Authority			
	Caring for Pets		123·PET; 123·DOG; 123·CAT; 123·TLC; 123·WAG; 123·WOF; 1ABC2	
	Keep Kids Safe		123·ZZY	Previously 123·KID, 123·TOT, 123·ZZZ.
	Olympic Spirit		123·WIN; 1ABC2	
	Police Memorial		123·OFC; 1ABC2	
	Preserve the Sound – Passenger		123·LBC	
	Home of the Patriots – Passenger			In 1998, New England Patriots owner Robert Kraft sought to relocate the team's home to downtown Hartford, Connecticut. Kraft and then-Connecticut Governor John G. Rowland were photographed at a related press conference shaking hands and holding a "Home of the Patriots" sample plate.
	Preserve the Sound – Camp Trailer			
	Preserve the Sound – Camper	"CAMP" embossed vertically.	123·LA	
	Preserve the Sound – Combination	"COMB" printed vertically to left of serial.	123·LA	Serials issued in descending order from 999·LZ.
	Preserve the Sound – Combination Handicapped	"COMB" printed vertically to left of serial.	123L	
	Preserve the Sound – Commercial	"COMM" printed vertically to left of serial; red serial.	123·CA	Previously 000·LA, for which the high is 269·LC.
	Preserve the Sound – Handicapped		123L	
	United We Stand – Passenger		1BAC2	Original format was 000·USA.
	United We Stand – Combination	"CO" and "MB" embossed vertically above and below separator dot.	1BCA2	Original format was USA·123.
	Veteran – Passenger		123·VBC	Originally 123·VET, then VAA and up.
	Veteran – Camper			
	Veteran – Combination	"CO" and "MB" embossed vertically above and below separator dot.	123·VSA	Originally 123·VET.
	Veteran – Combination Handicapped	Wheelchair embossed at right of plate. Format of 1V23 followed by "COMB" embossed vertically through at least 1V13; switched to format of 1V·23 with "CO" and "MB" embossed vertically above and below a separator dot at 3V·56 or lower.	1V·23	
	Veteran – Commercial		123·VZA	
	Veteran – Handicapped	Wheelchair embossed to left of serial.	1V·23	Previously 000·V
	Veteran – Motorcycle	"Veteran – MC" legend.		
	Veteran with V/E/T		123 V/E/T	
	Veteran – POW		123 P/O/W	
	Volunteer Firefighter – Passenger	"Constitution State" slogan with small logo at right.	123·AB	
	Volunteer Firefighter – Combination	"Constitution State" slogan with small logo at right.	123·CA	

=== Annual types ===
Image	Type	Design	Serial format	Notes
	Dealer – Motorcycle New	"Dealer" legend.	MXA·0, MXAA·0, MXA·00, MXAA·00, MXA·000	Numerical suffix signifies the dealership, which receives plates with sequential letters following the X.
	Dealer – Motorcycle Used	"Dealer" legend.	MDA·0, MDAA·0, MDA·00, MDAA·00, MDA·000	Numerical suffix signifies the dealership, which receives plates with sequential letters following the D.
	Dealer – Passenger New	"Dealer" legend.	XA·0, XAA·0, XA·00, XAA·00, XA·000, XAA·000, XA·0000	Numerical suffix signifies the dealership, which receives plates with sequential letters following the X.
	Dealer – Passenger Used	"Dealer" legend.	DA·0, DAA·0, DA·00, DAA·00, DA·000, DAA·000, DA·0000	Numerical suffix signifies the dealership, which receives plates with sequential letters following the D.
	Dealer – Special	"Dealer" legend.	SX·0000	Issued sequentially, not coded by dealership.
	Dismantler	"Dismantler" legend.	DA·0000	
	Repair	"Repair" legend.	RA·000, RA·0000	Numerical suffix signifies the repairer, which receives plates with sequential letters following the R.

=== Political types ===
On both flat blue on white and Preserve the Sound bases:

- Assistant Majority Leader
- Assistant Minority Leader
- Deputy Majority Leader
- Deputy Minority Leader

== Municipality codes ==
Code	Municipality
AS	Ansonia
AV	Avon
BA	Barkhamsted
BD	Bloomfield
BE	Berlin
BF	Beacon Falls
BK	Brookfield
BL	Bethel
BM	Bethlehem
BPT	Bridgeport
BR	Branford
BT	Bristol
BU	Burlington
BW	Bridgewater
BY	Bethany
CH	Cheshire
CL	Clinton
CN	Canton
CO	Colchester
COR	Cornwall
CP	Chaplin
CR	Chester
CU	Columbia
CV	Coventry
CW	Cromwell
DA	Danbury
DAR	Darien
DE	Derby
DR	Deep River
DU	Durham
EG	East Granby
EH	East Hartford
EHA	East Haven
EL	East Lyme
ELL	Ellington
EM	East Haddam
EN	East Hampton
ENF	Enfield
ES	Essex
ET	Easton
FA	Fairfield
FN	Farmington
FWD	Farmington Woods District (Farmington/Avon)
GL	Glastonbury
GLP	Groton Long Point
GO	Goshen
GR	Granby
GRO	Groton
GU	Guilford
GW	Greenwich
HE	Hebron
HFD	Hartford
HN	Hamden
HR	Hartland
KI	Killingly
KW	Killingworth
LD	Ledyard
LE	Lebanon
LFD	Litchfield
LI	Lisbon
MA	Manchester
MDC	Metropolitan District Commission, a non-profit municipal corporation that provides water to most of Hartford County
MDF	Middlefield
MDN	Madison
ME	Meriden
MF	Mansfield
MFD	Milford
MI	Middlebury
MN	Middletown
MO	Marlborough
MON	Monroe
MTV	Montville
NA	Naugatuck
NB	New Britain
NBR	North Branford
NC	New Canaan
NE	Newington
NF	New Fairfield
NFK	Norfolk
NH	New Haven
NHD	New Hartford
NHN	North Haven
NL	New London
NM	New Milford
NO	Norwich
NT	Newtown
NW	Norwalk
NWT	Second Taxing District of City of Norwalk (South Norwalk Electric and Water)
OL	Old Lyme
OR	Orange
OS	Old Saybrook
OX	Oxford
PL	Plainville
PO	Portland
PRO	Prospect
PT	Putnam
PY	Plymouth
RB	Roxbury
RE	Redding
RI	Ridgefield
RH	Rocky Hill
RPV	Regional Refuse District #1
SA	Salem
SBY	Southbury
SE	Seymour
SF	Stratford
SH	Shelton
SI	Simsbury
SO	Southington
SOM	Somers
ST	Stamford
STF	Stafford
STN	Stonington
SU	Suffield
SW	South Windsor
TH	Thomaston
TO	Torrington
TR	Trumbull
UN	Union
VE	Vernon
WAS	Washington
WB	Westbrook
WBY	Waterbury
WE	Weston
WF	Wallingford
WFD	Waterford
WH	West Hartford
WI	Wilton
WIN	Windsor
WL	Windsor Locks
WM	Windham
WN	West Haven
WO	Wolcott
WOO	Woodbridge
WP	Westport
WR	Winchester/Winsted
WT	Watertown
WTD	Wethersfield
WWL	Willington
WY	Woodbury

== State agency plates ==
Most state agencies in Connecticut register their vehicles with state plates. The plate starts with a number to represent the agency that owns the vehicle. Some agencies, such as the Connecticut State Police, register some vehicles using regular passenger or combination plates.

Code	Agency
1-	Department of Motor Vehicles
2-	Department of Transportation
5-	Department of Administrative Services – Fleet vehicles, leased to other agencies
9-	University of Connecticut (UCONN)
36-	Western Connecticut State University – Police
46-	Eastern Connecticut State University – Police
50-	Department of Energy and Environmental Protection
56-	Department of Emergency Services and Public Protection – State Police special vehicles (mobile crime lab, fire investigation unit, etc.)
58-	Department of Emergency Management and Homeland Security – CT-TF1 Urban Search & Rescue
79-	Department of Veteran Affairs – Vehicles belonging to the Veterans Home in Rocky Hill
