= Dorothy McCluskey =

American politician and conservationist (died 2013)

- McCluskey c. 1975

Member of the Connecticut House of Representatives from the 86th district
- In office 1975–1983
- Preceded by: Hoyte G. Brown Jr.
- Succeeded by: Timothy P. Ryan

Personal details
- Born: Dorothy Soest; 1928 or 1929 Middletown, Connecticut, U.S.
- Died: February 15, 2013 (aged 84) Mystic, Connecticut, U.S.
- Party: Democratic
- Spouse: Donald Shepard McCluskey
- Children: 3
- Education: Wheaton College (B.A.); Yale School of the Environment (M.F.S.)

Dorothy McCluskey (1928 or 1929 – February 15, 2013) was an American politician and conservationist from Connecticut. McCluskey was among the first women to graduate from the Yale School of the Environment, and she worked extensively in the field of conservation. She served in the Connecticut House of Representatives from 1975 to 1983, representing the 86th district as a Democrat.

== Personal life and education ==
Dorothy Soest was born in Middletown, Connecticut. In 1949, she graduated from Wheaton College in Massachusetts, where she earned an interdisciplinary bachelor's degree in philosophy and physics. McCluskey subsequently studied at the University of Oslo under a Fulbright scholarship, where she researched the life of Fridtjof Nansen.

In 1973, four years after Yale University became coeducational, McCluskey became the second woman to earn a Master's in Forest Science from the Yale School of the Environment.

In October 1954, McCluskey married Donald Shepard McCluskey, an alumnus of the Yale School of Engineering. Together, they had three children. Following McCluskey's service in the Connecticut House of Representatives, they moved to Block Island, Rhode Island.

== Conservation career ==
McCluskey worked in conservation, particularly in Connecticut and Rhode Island, and through Yale University. From 1973 to 1974, she was project manager of the Connecticut Inland Wetlands Project, a Ford Foundation pilot program. From 1985 to 1990, she was director of government relations for the Connecticut chapter of The Nature Conservancy.

In 1994, McCluskey started the Dorothy S. McCluskey Visiting Fellowship at the Yale School of the Environment. The fellowship provides up to one year of support for senior managers and scientists from the global non-profit environmental community who wish to study or conduct research at the school. Past recipients of the fellowship include Wangarĩ Maathai, Randal O'Toole, Robert Stanton, and Angela Cropper. In 2002, McCluskey endowed the fellowship in perpetuity with a $1 million donation.

== Political career ==
McCluskey first entered Connecticut politics in the late 1960s, when she helped create the town of North Branford's conservation commission. In the 1970s, she also served on the town's planning and zoning board.

In 1974, McCluskey was elected to the Connecticut House of Representatives, having focused much of her campaign on the local issue of the New Haven Water Company. In response to the Safe Drinking Water Act, the New Haven Water Company had proposed selling off its watershed land to offset increased expenses from the more frequent water testing required to remain in compliance with the law. McCluskey called for a moratorium on the sale of the land until an environmental study could be conducted to determine the impact on drinking water quality, and the company was converted from a private water utility to the government-owned South Central Connecticut Regional Water Authority in 1980 via special legislation. In 1996, McCluskey and fellow Connecticut politician and conservationist Claire C. Bennitt published a book about the process titled Who Wants to Buy a Water Company? From Private to Public Control in New Haven.

McCluskey served in the House of Representatives for four terms, representing the 86th district as a Democrat. She did not run for reelection in 1982, and she was succeeded by Timothy P. Ryan.

Following her service in the House of Representatives, McCluskey continued working in local government. From 1986 to 2001, she served on New Shoreham, Rhode Island's planning board.

== Death ==
McCluskey died on February 15, 2013, in Mystic, Connecticut. She was 84.
