= Claire Begg =

American politician (died 2025)

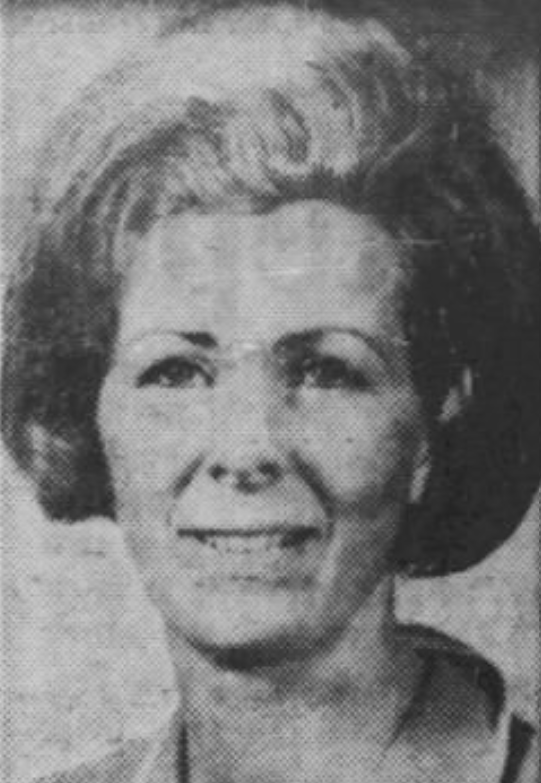

Member of the Connecticut House of Representatives from the 86th district
- In office 1971–1973
- Preceded by: William V. Begg
- Succeeded by: Hoyte G. Brown Jr.

Personal details
- Born: Waterbury, Connecticut, U.S.
- Died: February 15, 2025 Southbury, Connecticut, U.S.
- Party: Democratic
- Spouse(s): William V. Begg; Thomas G. Prezioso; Lew Capuano
- Children: 5
- Education: Waterbury Catholic High School; Quinnipiac College

Claire Begg Prezioso Capuano (died February 15, 2025) was an American politician who served in the Connecticut House of Representatives from 1971 to 1973, representing the 86th district as a Democrat. Begg's predecessor was her first husband, William V. Begg, who died in office in March 1971, two months into serving his third term. She was elected to serve the remainder of his unexpired term and did not run for reelection in 1972. Begg was succeeded by Hoyte G. Brown Jr. in 1973.
