= Louise Smith (state trooper) =

American police officer

- Occupation: Connecticut State Trooper
- Known for: Being the first female black state police officer

Louise Smith is a retired trooper with the Connecticut State Police from Durham, Connecticut. She is the first black woman to serve in a state police force in the United States.

== Personal life ==
At the time of her commissioning she resided in Durham, Connecticut. She claims to have received support to continue with her career as a law enforcement officer from the 1970s television show Get Christie Love, which featured a black woman working as a detective in Los Angeles.

== Career ==
She graduated the police academy and took her oath of office in 1968. She was the first black woman to join a state police force in Connecticut, and in fact she was the first to do so in the nation. She did not know at the time of her graduation that she was making national history, an article in Connecticut about the graduation simply remarked that “another woman” had graduated. She followed in the footsteps of Albert Washington of Branford who became the first black Connecticut state trooper in 1964.

Acceptance of her presence by existing state troopers was mixed, with some treating her as a sister and others refusing to even speak to her. Many in the public were also uncomfortable interacting with a black female law enforcement officer.

During the trial of Black Panther activist Angela Davis, she was assigned to escort Davis from the courtroom to her cell; deputies mistakenly locked up Smith with Davis before realizing their mistake.

== See also ==
- Women in law enforcement in the United States
