= Connecticut State Marshal =

Law enforcement agency in Connecticut

Connecticut State Marshals
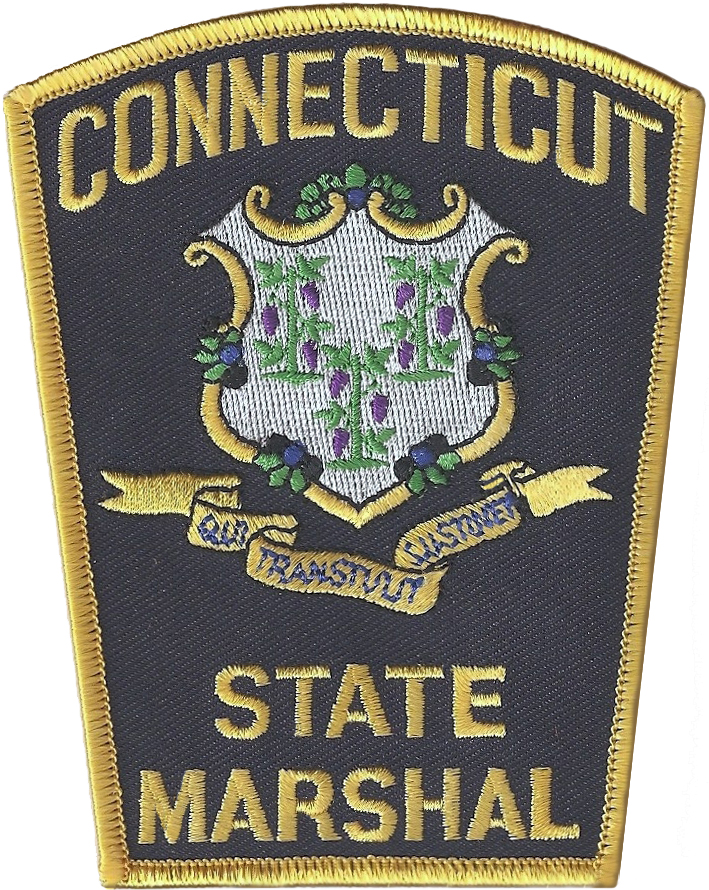
- Patch of the Connecticut State Marshals

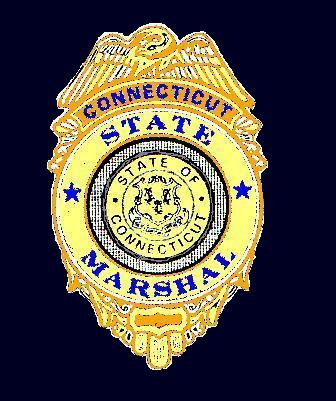
- Badge of the Connecticut State Marshals

Agency overview
- Formed: 2000
- Preceding agency: Connecticut County Sheriffs

Jurisdictional structure
- Operations jurisdiction: Connecticut, USA
- Legal jurisdiction: State of Connecticut
- Governing body: State of Connecticut
- General nature: Civilian police

Operational structure
- Headquarters: Hartford, Connecticut
- Marshals: 180
- Parent agency: State Marshal Commission

Website
- https://www.jud.ct.gov/faq/marshals.htm

Connecticut state marshals are sworn law enforcement officers in the state of Connecticut. Their primary duty is to serve and execute civil process directed to them from courts or various state and federal agencies. There are approximately 180 state marshals serving in Connecticut, appointed to specific counties within the state. Connecticut state marshal operations are overseen by the State Marshal Commission, an executive branch commission within the Department of Administrative Services, located in Hartford, Connecticut.

== History ==
Prior to state marshals, Connecticut had sheriff's offices dating back to the 1600s. In 2000, following several corruption scandals involving sheriffs, Article IV, Section 25 of the 1965 Constitution of the State of Connecticut (which specified the election of county sheriffs), was repealed. The sheriffs were replaced with the state marshal system and judicial marshals.

Sheriffs in Connecticut had several powers and duties under Connecticut statutes: deputy sheriffs received and executed process, and special deputy sheriffs handled transportation of prisoners and courthouse security. In 2000, the General Assembly created the state marshal system with Public Act 00-99 to replace the sheriff's offices. With the abolition of sheriffs, the special deputy sheriffs and their direct judicial functions were absorbed into the judicial branch and became judicial marshals, and the deputy sheriffs became state marshals.

== Oversight ==
The state marshal system consists of an eight-member State Marshal Commission, appointed for a three-year term, which sets training requirements and professional standards among other things; a 24-member advisory board – marshals elected by other marshals for one year – for communicating with the branches of government and discussing law changes and issues important to marshals; and approximately 180 state marshals, allocated by county. Two members of the State Marshal's Advisory Board also sit ex officio on the State Marshal Commission. The appointed members of State Marshal Commission include a chairperson appointed by the governor of Connecticut, a judge of the superior court appointed by the chief justice of the Connecticut Supreme Court, and members each appointed by the speaker of the House of Representatives, the president pro tempore of the Senate, the majority and minority leaders of the House of Representatives, and the majority and minority leaders of the state Senate. The state marshal system is a function of the executive branch of state government, although a current list of state marshals is also publicized by the Judicial branch on its website.

== Services ==
Connecticut state marshals have a broad range of statutory authority, and perform a number of functions for courts and other state and federal agencies. Duties and services include, but are not limited to, serving court documents (including summons and complaint, restraining orders, subpoenas, and contempt citations), transferring minors in emergency ex parte custody matters, enforcing judgments (including bank executions, wage garnishments, and seizure of property), evictions, serving tax warrants, and arresting individuals on bench warrants and capias mittimus warrants.

Connecticut state marshals are not directly employed by the State of Connecticut. They are compensated on a fee-for-service basis for each process served or executed, and are required to run their operations independently. This arrangement for the compensation of process fees is a legacy from the deputy sheriffs, and has a long history in the legal system in Connecticut dating back through the 17th century. State marshal fees are set by Connecticut General Statutes. Self-represented parties who are financially indigent can petition Connecticut courts for a waiver of service of process fees, wherein the State of Connecticut would pay the state marshal on behalf of the self-represented party. According to state law, the State of Connecticut through the Judicial Branch also pays marshal's fees for service of restraining and civil protection orders throughout the State of Connecticut.

Connecticut organizations that utilize the services of state marshals include the judicial system (Superior Court, Juvenile Court, Support Enforcement, Office of Victim Advocate, etc.); other agencies/quasi agencies of the State of Connecticut (Attorney General’s Office, Office of Consumer Protection, Department of Children and Families, Statewide Grievance Committee); municipalities (cities and towns), attorneys, and members of the general public intending to represent themselves in court. Connecticut state marshals also serve documents from other states as well as federal courts and agencies.

== Operations ==
Unlike other law enforcement officers throughout the State of Connecticut, state marshals do not generally wear a standard uniform. State marshals often perform their duties in plain clothes and unmarked cars. They are issued numbered badges and a photo ID card from the State of Connecticut. State marshals are required to carry identification while in the performance of their duties and display it upon request.

State marshals usually serve civil process by either leaving the document with the recipient or where the recipient normally resides ("in-hand" vs. "abode"). Generally, State marshals make abode service by leaving the process in the door jamb or between a storm door and a main door, although state marshals frequently serve papers by sliding papers into residences through the door jamb, and also by rubber banding or taping the papers to residence doors. Service of process is often done during regular business hours, however marshals are not prohibited from serving documents very early in the morning or late evening hours, on weekends and holidays, or at individual's workplaces, or in other public or private spaces.

State marshals in the performance of execution or service of process functions, have the right of entry on private property and are not subject to trespassing and are not liable for property damage or injury. Connecticut state marshals can carry firearms, pepper spray, handcuffs, and batons while on duty. Training is conducted at the Connecticut Police Academy.

== Warrant Unit ==
The Connecticut state marshals have a warrant unit made up of approximately 35 POSTC certified state marshals. Marshals in the capias unit are provided unmarked vehicles by the State of Connecticut, generally kept at local state police barracks. State marshals are empowered to arrest individuals statewide under the authority of a capias or capias mittimus warrant. Such warrants are civil arrest warrants issued by the court ordering an officer to take an individual into custody for violating a court order or for failing to appear in court after receiving a summons to appear, a subpoena, or a citation. Most commonly, capias warrants are issued by family support magistrates in the context of a child support matter where the individual who owes back child support has failed to appear for a hearing. In these matters the warrant is issued based on a failure to appear in court when summoned. State marshals also arrest individuals under capias warrants for failing to appear in court or for a deposition after receiving a subpoena.

== See also ==
- List of law enforcement agencies in Connecticut
- Marshal
