= Connecticut's 86th House of Representatives district =

American legislative district

Connecticut's 86th State House of Representatives district
Representative
Vincent Candelora; R

Connecticut's 86th House of Representatives district elects one member of the Connecticut House of Representatives. It includes the town of North Branford, along with parts of Durham, Guilford, and Wallingford. The district has been represented by Republican Vincent Candelora since 2007.

== List of representatives ==
Representative	Party	Years	District home	Note
William V. Begg	Democratic	1967 – 1971	Waterbury	
Claire Begg	Democratic	1971 – 1973	Waterbury	
Hoyte G. Brown Jr.	Republican	1973 – 1975	Northford	
Dorothy McCluskey	Democratic	1975 – 1983	Northford	
Timothy P. Ryan	Democratic	1983 – 1985	North Branford	
Robert Ward	Republican	1985 – 2007	Northford	Served as Minority Leader of the Connecticut House of Representatives
Vincent Candelora	Republican	2007 – present	North Branford	Serving as Minority Leader of the Connecticut House of Representatives

== Recent elections ==
=== 2020 ===
2020 Connecticut State House of Representatives election, District 86
Party	Candidate	Votes	%
Republican	Vincent Candelora (incumbent)	8,497	61.37
Democratic	Vincent J. Mase Sr.	4,783	34.54
Independent Party	Vincent Candelora (incumbent)	566	4.09
Total votes		13,846	100.00
Republican hold			

=== 2018 ===
2018 Connecticut House of Representatives election, District 86
Party	Candidate	Votes	%
Republican	Vincent Candelora (Incumbent)	6,796	62.3
Democratic	Vincent Mase	3,961	36.3
Green	Colin Souney	144	1.3
Total votes		10,901	100.0
Republican hold			

=== 2016 ===
2016 Connecticut House of Representatives election, District 86
Party	Candidate	Votes	%
Republican	Vincent Candelora (Incumbent)	8,740	86.17
Unaffiliated	Vincent Mase	1,403	13.83
Total votes		10,143	100.0
Republican hold			

=== 2014 ===
2014 Connecticut House of Representatives election, District 86
Party	Candidate	Votes	%
Republican	Vincent Candelora (Incumbent)	5,967	100.0
Total votes		5,967	100.0
Republican hold			

=== 2012 ===
2012 Connecticut House of Representatives election, District 86
Party	Candidate	Votes	%
Republican	Vincent Candelora (Incumbent)	7,275	100.0
Total votes		7,275	100.0
Republican hold			
