= Connecticut State Capitol =

State capitol building of Connecticut, US

- U.S. National Register of Historic Places
- U.S. National Historic Landmark
- North Facade of the Connecticut State Capitol (2026)

- Location within Connecticut Location within the United States
- Interactive map showing the location of Connecticut State Capitol
- Location: Hartford, Connecticut
- Coordinates: 41°45′51″N 72°40′56″W
- Built: 1878; 148 years ago
- Architect: Richard M. Upjohn; James G. Batterson
- Architectural style: Eastlake; Victorian Gothic; Renaissance Revival
- NRHP reference No.: 70000834

Significant dates
- Added to NRHP: December 30, 1970
- Designated NHL: December 30, 1970

The Connecticut State Capitol is located north of Capitol Avenue and south of Bushnell Park in Hartford, the capital of Connecticut. The building houses the Connecticut General Assembly; the upper house, the State Senate, and lower house, the House of Representatives, as well as the office of the Governor of the State of Connecticut. The Connecticut Supreme Court occupies a building (built 1908–1910) across Capitol Avenue.

== History ==
The current building is the third capitol building for the State of Connecticut since the American Revolution.

The General Assembly of Connecticut (state legislature) met alternately in Hartford and New Haven since before the American Revolution. When in Hartford, the General Assembly met in the Old State House, designed in 1792 by Charles Bulfinch, and when sitting in New Haven, in a State House designed in 1827 by Ithiel Town. After the Civil War, the complications of this plan began to be evident, and both Hartford and New Haven competed to be sole state capital. Hartford won, and the new sole capital needed one central capitol building. The General Assembly authorized a million dollar project, and two competitors, James G. Batterson and Richard M. Upjohn, vied to be awarded the project. Upjohn won, but Batterson, a stone importer and merchant and not an architect, was named the building contractor. Batterson then continually revised the Upjohn plan to more and more closely resemble his own plan. The central tower, for example, is Batterson's, not Upjohn's. Batterson's extensive elaboration of Upjohn's plan ended up more than doubling the cost to over $2,500,000.

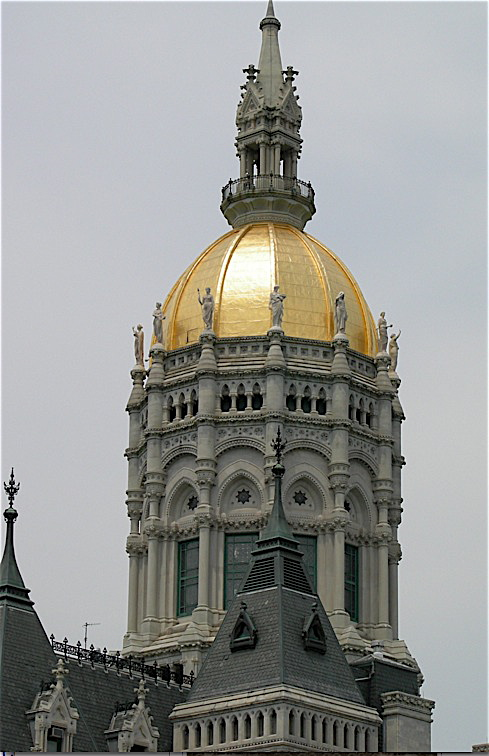
Dome detail

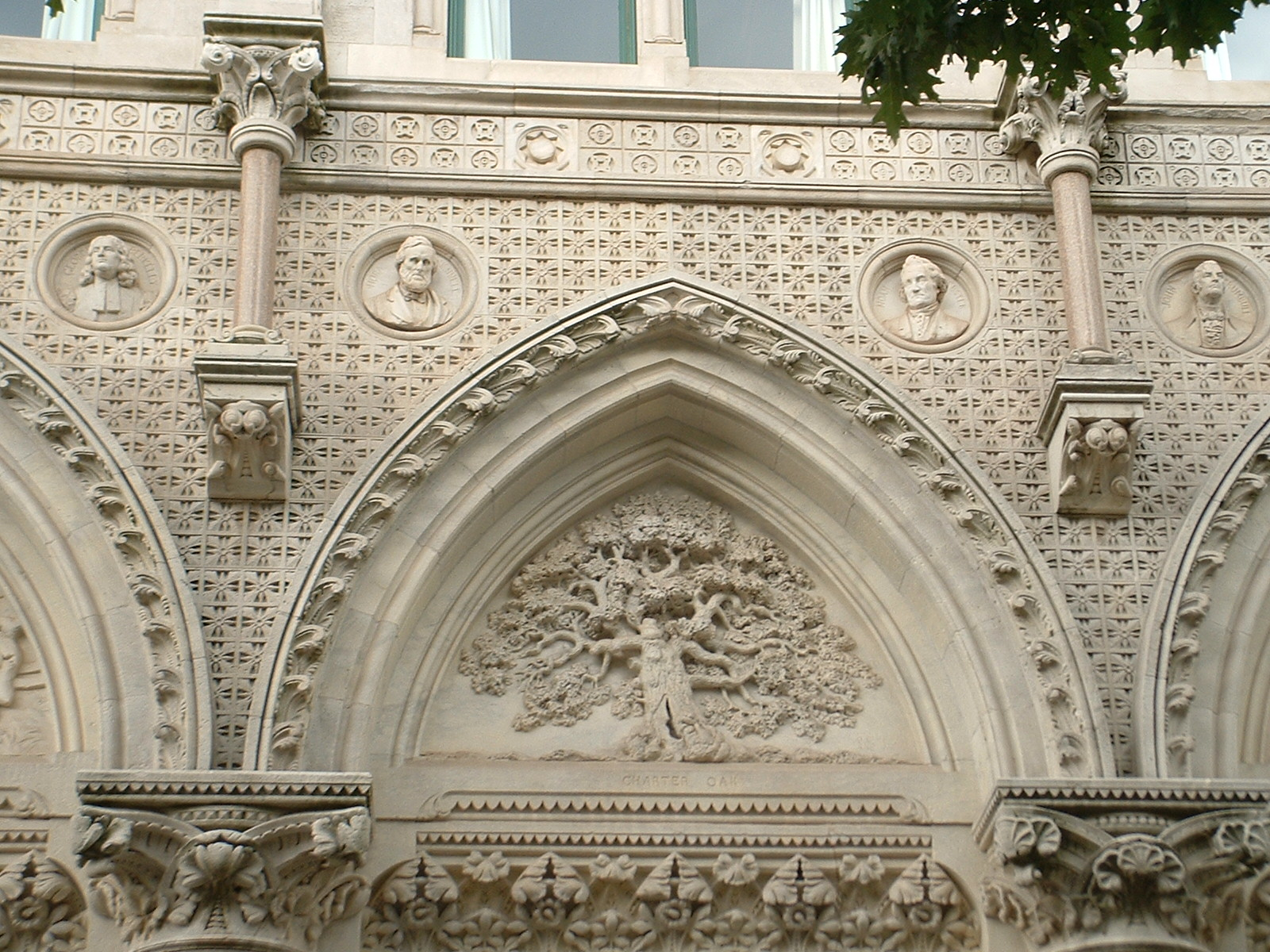
The Charter Oak relief above the East entrance, with the busts of Horace Bushnell and Noah Webster above

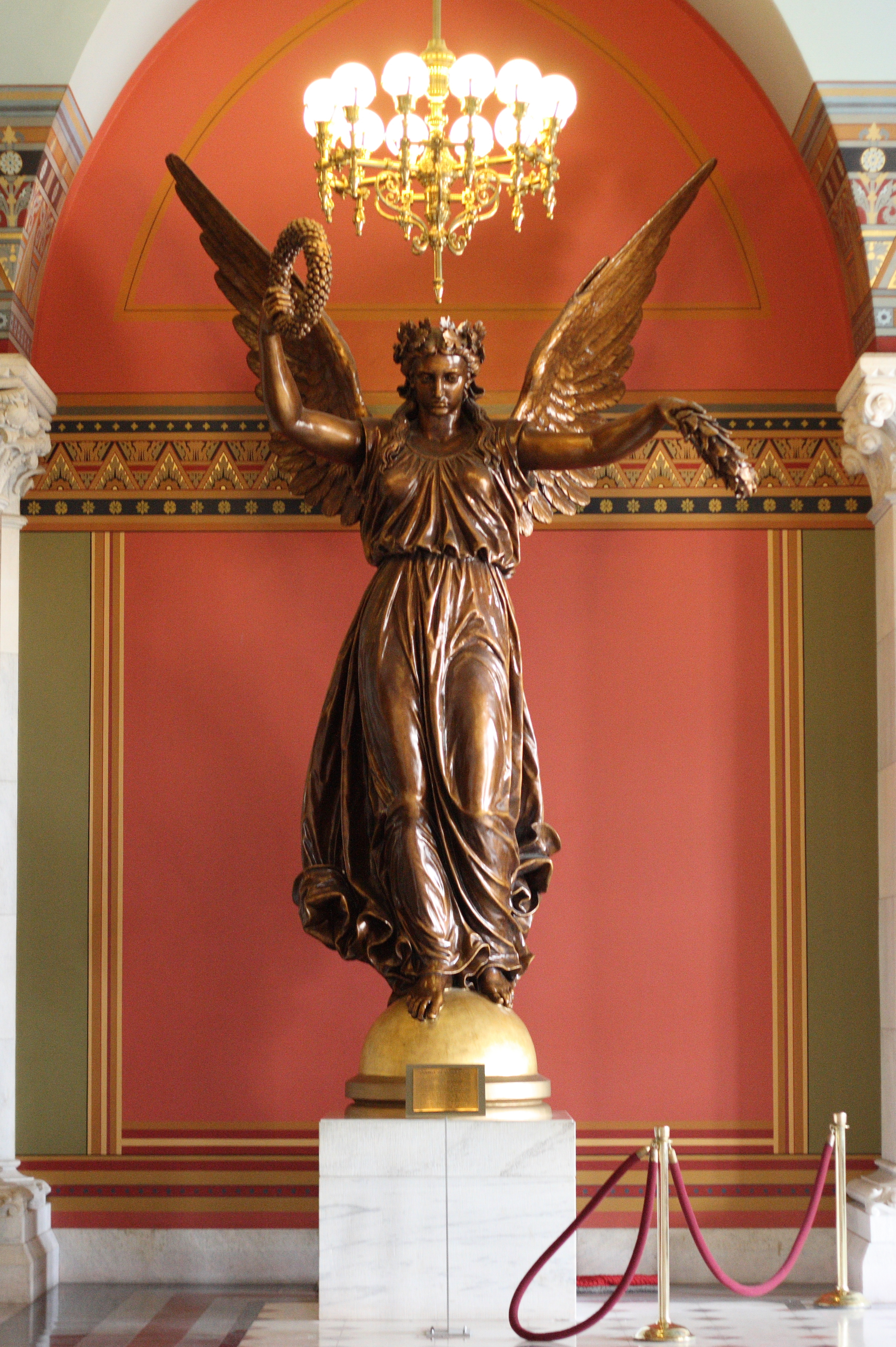
The Genius of Connecticut by sculptor Randolph Rogers (1877–78); a plaster version of the bronze statue (destroyed) originally mounted on top of the dome, is exhibited on the main floor.

Richard M. Upjohn's design is in the Eastlake style, with French and Gothic Revival styled elements. Construction of the building began in 1871. The building was completed in 1878, and it opened for the session of the General Assembly of Connecticut in January 1879. The New York Times described the newly constructed building: "a vast mass of white marble (is) this imposing structure, and in the dazzling sunshine of a New-England Summer noon sparkles like a fairy palace of frost work."

The site of the Capitol was chosen since it is adjacent to Bushnell Park and had access to more surrounding open space than the older building in the immediate downtown. The site was originally the location of the old Trinity College and was then known as "Trinity Hill", and the city street to the immediate east is still named Trinity Street. (Trinity College relocated to a new campus south of the downtown.)

Some galleries on the building's main floor hold historical artifacts, principally battle standards of Civil War units. The flags were deposited with the state by 10,000 of the state's veterans, who formed a procession to the Capitol, and deposited 30 regimental flags on September 17, 1879. This action was taken to make the building a memorial to the Civil War.

The building suffered some crowding of offices, and the introduction of partition walls and other temporary expedients which detracted from the plan of the building up to 1979 and 1989 when efforts began at restoration.

The State Capitol was designated as a National Historic Landmark in 1971.

== Architecture ==
The building is one of the largest Eastlake style buildings. The exterior is of marble from East Canaan, Connecticut and granite from Westerly, Rhode Island. The building is roughly rectangular, the interior spaces organized around two open interior courts that run vertically to large skylights. In the center is a third circular open rotunda beneath the dome. The larger hall of the House of Representatives forms an extension on the south side.

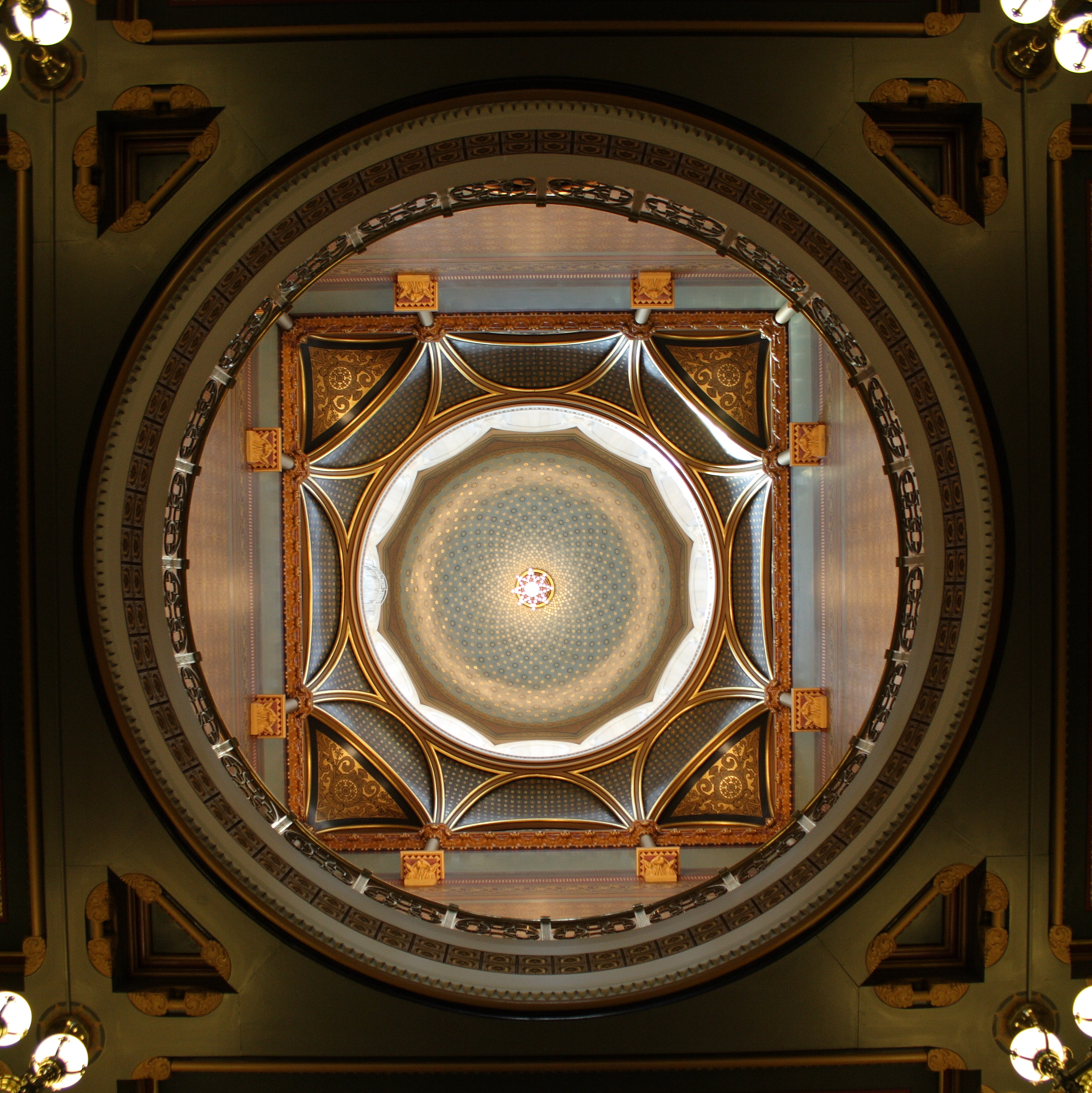
Interior of building Rotunda

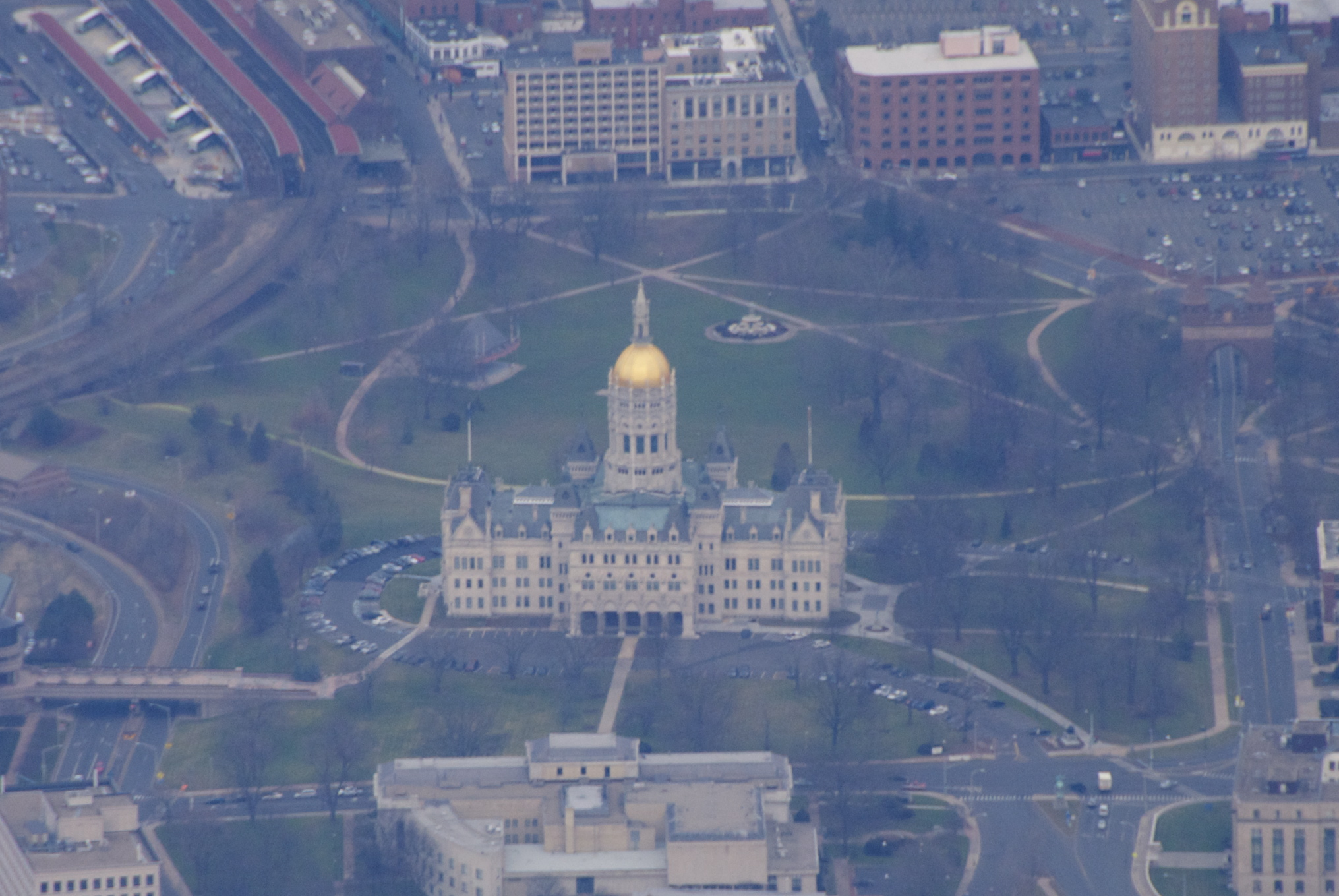
Aerial view of the Connecticut State Capitol

The building's ornately decorated facades display statuary and include several statues, medallions and carved tympana over the doors (except the west, which only has statues). The statues are of politicians and other people important to the state's history, including the Reverend Thomas Hooker (1586–1647), Major John Mason (1600–1672), Governor John Winthrop Jr. (1605/1606–1676), Roger Sherman (1721–1793), Revolutionary War Governor Jonathan Trumbull (1710–1785), Noah Webster (1758–1843), General Joseph Hawley (1826–1905), Civil War Secretary of the Navy Gideon Welles (1802–1878), and United States Senator Orville Hitchcock Platt (1827–1905). There are 24 niches for sculpture, eight of which are still empty. The last one added was that of Ella T. Grasso (b. 1919), the first female governor of the state, who died in 1981 of cancer shortly after resigning her office.

There are high relief scenes from the state's history in the 16 tympana above the doors, except for the carving above the main north door, which is of the state seal. The typanum of the main east door holds The Charter Oak by Charles Salewski, the first piece of sculpture created for the Capitol. The interior floors used white marble and red slate from Connecticut, and some of the colored marble is from Italy.

The statues, medallions, and tympana are grouped by period. The north facade has six statues, five tympana, and two medallions, and the carvings are of pre-Revolutionary War figures. The east and west facades contain people from the Revolutionary War or government service, and the south facade's figures are from the Civil War and onwards.

The central domed tower is distinctive. The dome itself is 32 ft (9.8 m) tall; on top of that is a cupola 55 ft (16.8 m) in height, and the drum below is 75 ft (22.9 m), making the drum taller than the 70 ft (21.3 m) height of the main walls. The overall height of the tower is 257 ft (78.3 m).

The building's dome originally had a large statue on top, named The Genius of Connecticut, which was taken down in 1938 after being damaged in the great hurricane of that year. The statue was cast in bronze from a plaster original, and was 17 ft 10 in (5.4 m) tall, and weighed 7,000 lb (3,175 kg). It was executed in Rome and was cast in Munich, Germany. During World War II, the piece was donated to the federal government and melted down as part of the war effort to make ammunition and machine parts. The original plaster statue is now at the capitol, and has been coated in bronze. In 2002, Proposed Bill No. 5273 before the General Assembly sought authorization to make a new casting of the statue to restore the design for the capitol dome. The project finally passed in 2009, and a new bronze cast has been made. It has not yet been mounted on the summit of the dome, awaiting an additional $200,000 in funding.

At the exterior base of the dome are 12 statues in six pairs representing Agriculture, Commerce, Education/Law, Force/War, Science/Justice, and Music.

The interior has two matching ornate open stairwells and all of the building interior is painted in a multi-colored scheme continuing the 1870s Eastlake design aesthetic throughout.

The Capitol Building is open to the public, with self-guided and guided tours available on weekdays. Guided tours begin inside the West Entrance of the Legislative Office Building.

== See also ==
- Connecticut State Capitol Police
- List of National Historic Landmarks in Connecticut
- National Register of Historic Places listings in Hartford, Connecticut
- List of state and territorial capitols in the United States
