= Vincent Candelora =

Connecticut politician

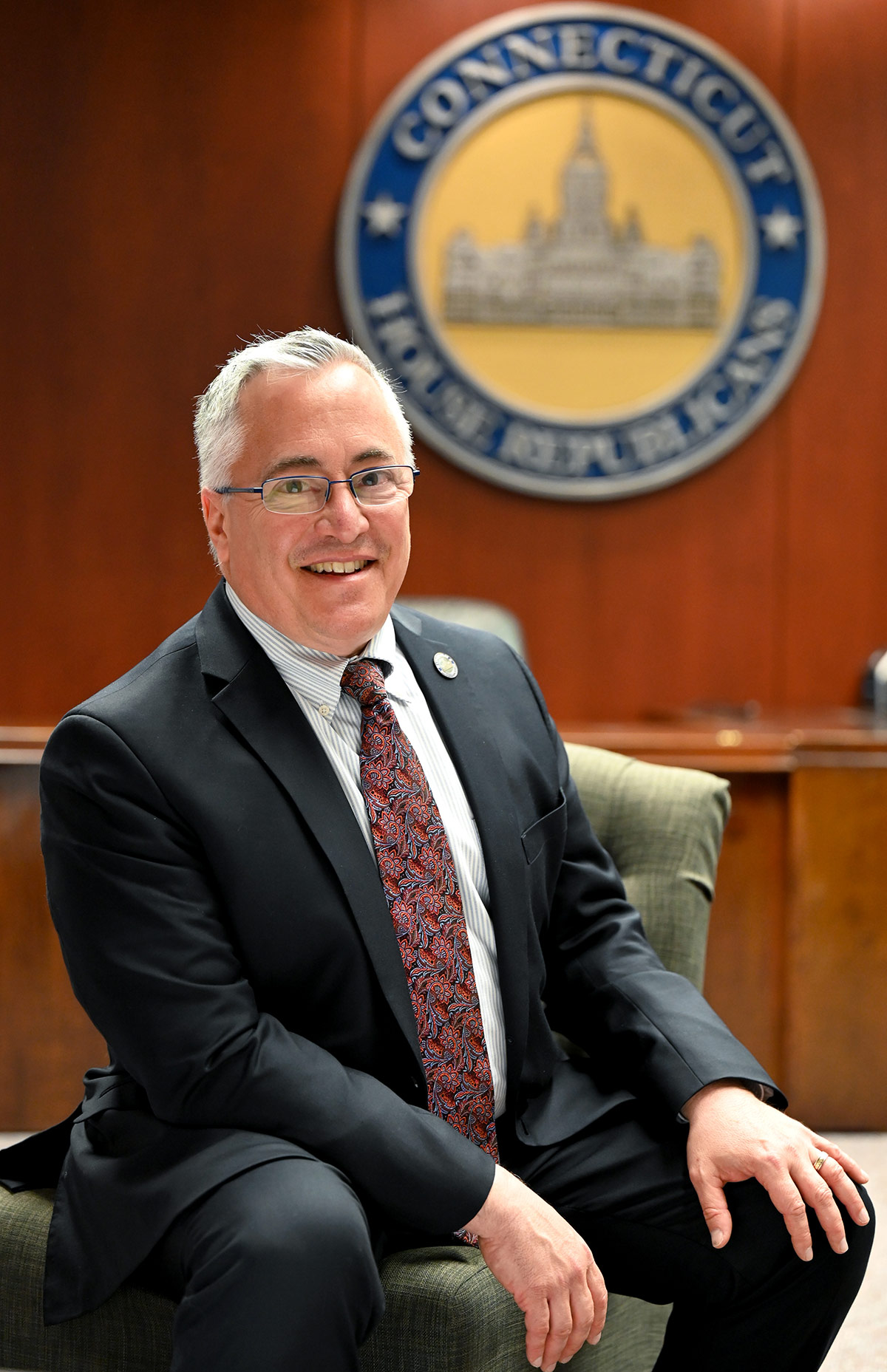

Minority Leader of the Connecticut House of Representatives
- Incumbent
- Assumed office January 6, 2021
- Preceded by: Themis Klarides

Member of the Connecticut House of Representatives from the 86th district
- Incumbent
- Assumed office January 2007
- Preceded by: Robert Ward

Personal details
- Party: Republican
- Spouse: Carolyn Candelora
- Children: 3
- Education: Connecticut College (BA); Pennsylvania State University (JD)

Vincent John Candelora is an American businessman, lawyer, and politician. Candelora is the State Representative for the 86th House District and also serves as the Republican Minority Leader in the Connecticut House of Representatives.

== Education ==
In 1992, Candelora earned a BA degree from Connecticut College. In 1995, Candelora earned a JD degree from Pennsylvania State University's Dickinson School of Law.

== Career ==
As a businessman, Candelora is the owner and manager of Connecticut Sportsplex. Candelora also works for Taconic Wire.

Candelora's political career began as a council member of North Branford, Connecticut, where he served three terms.

In 2006, Candelora was elected to the legislature. On November 8, 2016, Candelora defeated Vincent Mase and won the General election. On November 6, 2018, Candelora defeated Vincent Mase again and won the General election.

Candelora is a Republican member of the Connecticut State House of Representatives for District 86, serving his 7th term. Candelora's district includes the communities of Northford, North Guilford, Durham, and Wallingford.

== Awards ==
- 2017 Connecticut Alliance of YMCA 2017's legislative champion. Given by Wallingford YMCA.
- 2018 Charles Stetson Award. Given by Family Institute of Connecticut.

== Personal life ==
Candelora's wife is Carolyn. They have three children. Candelora resides in North Branford, Connecticut.

Connecticut House of Representatives
Preceded by Themis Klarides	Minority Leader of the Connecticut House of Representatives; 2021–present	Incumbent
