= Connecticut Department of Emergency Management and Homeland Security =

State agency of Connecticut, US

Connecticut Division of Emergency Management and Homeland Security

State agency overview
- Jurisdiction: Connecticut
- Headquarters: 1111 Country Club Road Middletown, CT 06457
- State agency executive: Ronnell A. Higgins, Commissioner
- Parent State agency: Connecticut Department of Emergency Services and Public Protection
- Website: portal.ct.gov/demhs

The Connecticut Division of Emergency Management and Homeland Security (DEMHS) is a state agency of Connecticut. Its headquarters are located at the Department of Emergency Services and Public Protection building in Middletown.
