= Connecticut Judicial Marshal =

Court officers

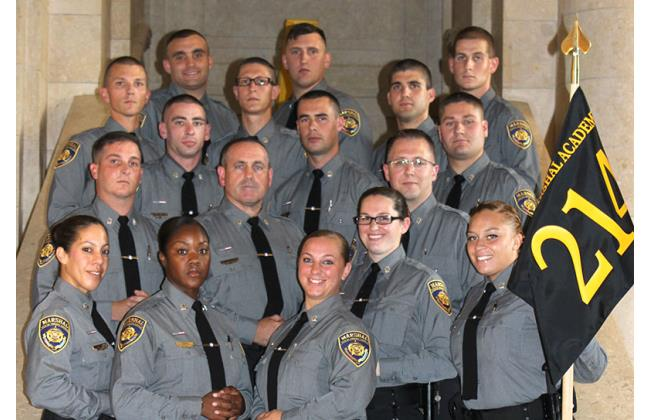
Judicial Marshal academy class in 2014

The Connecticut Judicial Marshals are Court Officers in the state of Connecticut. The Judicial Marshals are sworn peace officers, with powers of arrest. They perform prisoner transport and courthouse security.

The Connecticut Judicial Marshal System was created to replace the now-defunct Connecticut County Sheriffs in 2000 and fulfills all of the services that the county sheriffs departments carried out:

- Prisoner transport and processing
- Judicial security
- Bailiff
- Courthouse Security
- Staff cell blocks within Judicial Branch courthouses

In 2016 the Judicial Branch closed its 24-hour lockup facilities in Hartford and New Haven and now rely upon the Department of Corrections for after-hours supervision of prisoners.

Judicial Marshals are required to be biennially certified in the use of pepper spray, handcuffs, defensive batons, and CPR. In a departure from their predecessors in the County Sheriffs office, Judicial Marshals do not carry firearms at any time during the performance of their duties.

== History ==
Prior to December 2000, the duties of the current judicial marshals were the responsibility of 8 elected "high sheriffs." Numerous allegations of corruption caused the voters of Connecticut to disband and abolish all sheriffs within the state, by a vote of nearly 2-1.

== See also ==
- List of law enforcement agencies in Connecticut
- US Marshall Service Court Security Officers
- Bailiff
