= Connecticut Department of Emergency Services and Public Protection =

State agency of Connecticut, US

State agency overview
- Jurisdiction: Connecticut
- Headquarters: 1111 Country Club Road Middletown, CT 06457
- State agency executive: Ronnell A. Higgins, Commissioner
- Child agencies: Commission on Fire Prevention and Control (CFPC); Connecticut State Police (CSP); Connecticut Department of Emergency Management and Homeland Security (DEMHS); Police Officer Standards and Training Council (POSTC); Division of Scientific Services (DSS); Division of Statewide Emergency Telecommunications (DSET)
- Website: portal.ct.gov/despp

The Connecticut Department of Emergency Services and Public Protection, formerly the Connecticut Department of Public Safety, is a statewide law agency of Connecticut for law enforcement, fire services, and scientific services. Its headquarters are in Middletown. The current commissioner is Ronnell A. Higgins. The Department of Emergency Services and Public Protection was created due to a statewide reorganization of state agencies. The reorganization dissolved the Department of Public Safety, merged the Commission on Fire Prevention and Control, dissolved the Department of Emergency Management and Homeland Security (DEMHS) and merged the Police Officer Standards and Training Council (POST).

== DESPP Divisions ==
- Division of Fire Services
- Connecticut State Police
- Police Officer Standards and Training Council
- Division of Scientific Services
- Statewide Emergency Telecommunications
- Emergency Management and Homeland Security
