= Connecticut State Police =

- Patch of Connecticut State Police

- Badge of Connecticut State Police
- Abbreviation: CSP
- Motto: “ Professionalism through an elite and diverse team of men and women. Respect for ourselves and others through our words and actions. Integrity through adherence to standards and values that merit public trust. Dedication to our colleagues, our values, and to the service of others. Equality through fair and unprejudiced application of the law."

Agency overview
- Formed: May 29, 1903; 123 years ago
- Employees: 875 Troopers and 533 Civilian Employees (as of 2022)

Jurisdictional structure
- Operations jurisdiction: Connecticut, USA
- Connecticut State Police Troop map
- Area: 5,544 square miles (14,360 km^{2})
- Population: 3,502,309 (2007 est.)
- General nature: Civilian police

Operational structure
- Headquarters: Middletown, Connecticut
- Troopers: 875 Troopers (as of 2022)
- Civilian Employees: 533 Civilian Employees (as of 2020)
- Agency executive: Daniel Loughman, Colonel
- Parent agency: Connecticut Department of Emergency Services and Public Protection

Facilities
- Troops: 12

Website
- Connecticut State Police

The Connecticut State Police (CSP) is the state police and highway patrol of the U.S. state of Connecticut, responsible for statewide traffic regulation and law enforcement, especially in areas not served by (or served by smaller) municipal police. It is a division of the Connecticut Department of Emergency Services and Public Protection. The CSP currently has about 875 troopers as of June 28, 2022, and is headquartered in Middletown, Connecticut. The Connecticut State Police is also responsible for protecting the Governor of Connecticut, Lieutenant Governor of Connecticut, and their families.

== History ==
=== Early history ===
The Connecticut State Police was created under House Bill #247 on May 29, 1903. Initially, five men, paid three dollars a day, were hired to enforce state liquor and vice laws, making it one of the oldest State Police forces in the nation. It was originally composed of five troopers primarily responsible for interdicting the production of moonshine. Early troopers traveled the state by railroad until automobile and motorcycle patrols were instituted, and troopers would often spend five to six days working, eating, and sleeping in the barracks constructed around the state. By 1924, seven such barracks had been built. The organization was heavily militaristic, and its internal culture was similar in this regard to other state police agencies in New England.

=== Modern history ===
In 1968 Louise Smith graduated from the State Police Academy becoming the first black woman to join a state police force in the United States.

In 1984 a federal judge found that the State Police systematically discriminated against minorities and ordered the State Police to increase the number of minorities in specialist positions as well as increase minority promotion rates.

In 1987 the Connecticut State Police were sued by the Connecticut chapter of Men and Women for Justice for discriminating against Black and Hispanic officers and officer candidates as well as other Civil Rights Act violations. The State Police chose to settle the case and made an agreement that the State Police would hire at least 10% Black and Hispanic officers, an accurate reflection of the State’s demographics in the early 1980s. In 2018 the hiring practices of the State Police remained the minimum allowed under their legally binding agreement with 5% of officers being Black and 5% being Hispanic despite Black and Hispanic Americans constituting over 25% of Connecticut's citizens in 2018.

In 1997 the Connecticut State Police was at the center of Connecticut Governor John G. Rowland’s Geargate scandal Surplus military equipment intended for the State Police was diverted by Rowland and close associates for their personal use. Equipment and apparel including sleeping bags, camouflage jackets, helmets, and a bayonet made their way into the hands of Rowland’s children, his staff, his security detail, and the husband of then Lt. Gov. Jodi Rell. The diversion was organized by State Trooper Eugene D’Angelo and was uncovered through a joint State Police and Department of Defense investigation.

In 2015 State Police Troop H and Troop C were among six Connecticut police departments singled out in a state report on racial bias in policing for having the most "significant disparities in their traffic stops data,” in particular traffic stop rates for Black and Hispanic drivers were much higher during the day when officers can easily visually establish the ethnicity of a driver before a stop than at night. The report was the most comprehensive report of its kind ever compiled by a state at the time of its release.

On December 31, 2018, Stavros Mellekas took over as the commander of the Connecticut State Police, replacing George F. Battle.

==== Fake ticketing scandal ====
In June 2023, following a news report revealed that four state troopers had fabricated hundreds of traffic stop tickets, an audit released by researchers at the University of Connecticut and Northeastern University found that nearly 26,000 reports made to the state's racial profiling database could not be corroborated, and that possibly over 58,000 falsified records were created. The audit found that the State Police overreported traffic infractions that were said to involve White non-Hispanic drivers, and underreported incidents which were said to involve Black or Hispanic drivers. State Police Colonel Stavros Mellekas said that the number of falsified records declined after 2018, and noted that no state resident received a fake ticket, but rather that state troopers made up fake traffic stops to skew information in the agency's racial profiling system.

Upon its release, the report attracted concern from members of the Connecticut General Assembly and civil rights groups such as the ACLU, whose Connecticut chapter released a statement saying the ticket falsifications showed "breathtaking disrespect" for the state's ban on racial profiling, and efforts to reduce systemic racism in policing.

By July, the scandal had drawn the scrutiny of numerous investigations. The Department of Emergency Services and Public Protection, which oversees the Connecticut State Police, received a subpoena from the federal Department of Transportation, and its Commissioner, James Rovella, stated that it could also receive an inquiry from the Justice Department. Separately, governor Ned Lamont appointed Deidre M. Daly, a former federal prosecutor, to investigate how the misconduct occurred, how it went unreported for years, and how to prevent future misconduct. While this was happening, state officials placed an officer on administrative leave after he reported motorists he interacted with as Native American when they belonged to other racial groups.

By August 4, the United States Department of Justice announced it was taking over the investigation into the scandal. On August 10, the Connecticut State Police Union voted no confidence in the Commissioner of the Department of Emergency Services and Public Projection, James Rovella, and the Colonel of the Connecticut State Police, Stavros Mellekas. The President of the Connecticut State Police Union complained that the two officials "stood by idly, as you allowed others to publicly make false allegations, destroy the morale of our Troopers, and dismantle the reputation of the State Police". By this time, speculation over a civil rights component within the ongoing federal investigation began, as some lawyers commented that the federal government could enter into a consent decree with the state government if it found that the falsification of traffic stops was widespread enough to skew demographic data collected.

In October 2023, following the controversy and union no-confidence votes, Commissioner James Rovella and Colonel Stavros Mellekas retired, and Governor Lamont appointed former Yale public safety chief Ronnell Higgins to head the Department of Emergency Services and Public Protection.

On February 1, 2024, Deidre Daly released the findings of the independent investigation, which concluded that the scope of intentional falsification was "far more limited" than the initial audit had indicated. The inquiry found no evidence that troopers or constables coordinated to skew racial profiling statistics or conceal discriminatory enforcement. Investigators determined that 74 of the 81 active troopers and constables flagged in the 2023 audit were unlikely to have committed intentional misconduct, instead attributing the vast majority of discrepancies to deficient data-entry practices, inadequate training, technical and software synchronization issues, and systemic leadership failures to audit records dating back to 2018. However, the report referred six active troopers and one constable to the agency's internal affairs division for suspected intentional falsification—primarily motivated by an effort to appear more productive to supervisors.

== Weapons ==
In 2012, CSP transitioned to the SIG Sauer P220R .45 ACP pistol. Prior to this, the SIG Sauer P229 had been issued since 1996.

In June 2022, CSP began transitioning to the Glock 45 9mm fitted with a tactical light and night sights. Troopers also began carrying only two spare magazines as opposed to the three issued with the SIG P220R.

== Organization ==
The Connecticut State Police is headquartered in Middletown, Connecticut.

=== Troops ===
The CSP is divided into 11 troops, each of which has a lieutenant troop commander, a master sergeant executive officer, several patrol sergeants, a detective unit, and a full complement of personnel for patrol. The "resident troopers" in that troop area are also assigned to the troop. Additionally, each troop has its own dispatchers and clerical unit, and most have one or more mechanics to service the fleet.

Some troops, because of their location, are tasked primarily with highway patrol functions while other troops in more rural areas serve as rural police, i.e.: response to crimes, patrol of towns and neighborhoods, and providing police services to many Connecticut towns that do not have police departments of their own. (Connecticut has no County Sheriff Departments).

- Troop A – Southbury
- Troop B – Canaan
- Troop C – Tolland
- Troop D – Danielson
- Troop E – Montville
- Troop F – Westbrook
- Troop G – Bridgeport
- Troop H – Hartford
- Troop I – Bethany
- Troop K – Colchester
- Troop L – Litchfield
- Troop H – BDL – Bradley International Airport in Windsor Locks, Troop H – Hartford at BIA supports Airport security functions as airport police, incident investigation, and backs up the airport management. Troop H also works with the Customs and Border Protection and the DEA.

=== Other units ===
Other units organized by the CSP that are not divided by troops include:

- Statewide Organized Crime Investigative Task Force
- Statewide Narcotics Task Force
- Welfare Fraud Unit
- Criminal Intelligence Unit
- Fire Marshal Division
- Training Division
- Licensing and Permits Section
- Forensics Laboratory
- Photography and Identification unit
- Polygraph Unit
- Fleet management & Purchasing
- Emergency Services Unit, including the following subunits:
  - Aviation
  - Bomb Squad
  - SCUBA (Dive Team)
  - K-9
  - Tactical Units (SWAT)
  - Mass Transit Security Explosive Detection Unit

The CSP also has a contingent of volunteer surgeons and volunteer chaplains.

== Vehicles ==
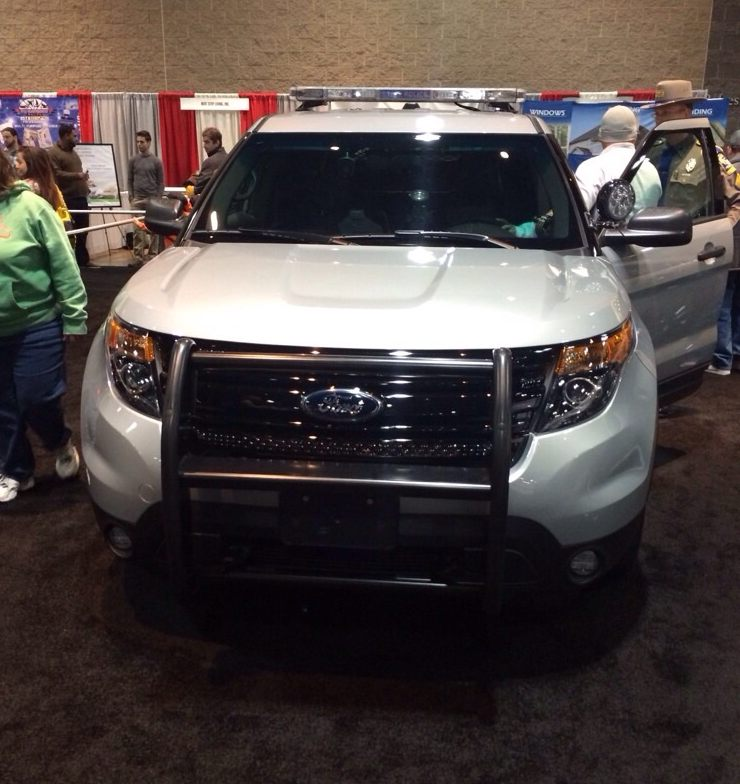
A Ford Police Interceptor Utility used by the Connecticut State Police. Note the all-grey paint scheme and the lack of markings.

Uniquely, the CSP uses a fleet consisting almost entirely of unmarked police cars, most commonly in grey, with or without custom-marked detachable roof-mounted lightbars. The reason for their use of unmarked cars is ascribed to officers’ ability to take cars home and use them in a personal capacity where markings may not be desired. The models used by the CSP are most commonly typical police vehicles such as the Ford Crown Victoria Police Interceptor, Ford Police Interceptor Sedan, Ford Police Interceptor Utility, Chevrolet Caprice, and Dodge Charger, but the CSP sometimes also uses vehicles not traditionally used by law enforcement, such as various assorted models from Ford, Chevrolet, Chrysler, Dodge, Ram, Buick, Toyota, and Mazda.

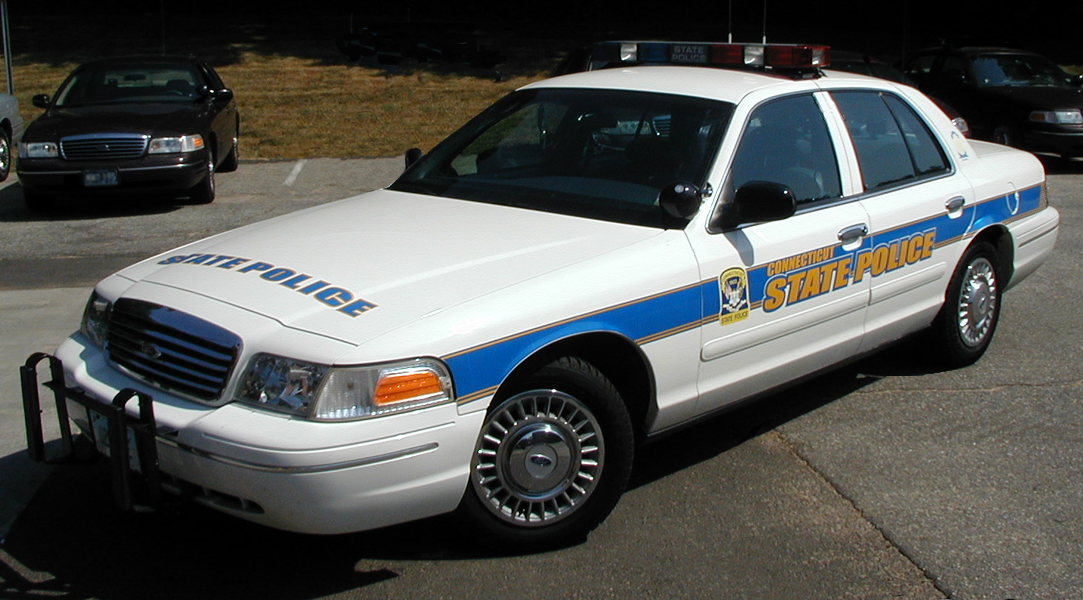
A marked Ford Crown Victoria Police Interceptor used by the Connecticut State Police for special purposes.

Though most of the CSP's fleet is unmarked, there are still vehicles that do have markings. Each troop is issued one marked car featuring a livery consisting of white with CSP badging on the doors and blue-and-yellow pinstripes running along the length of the car; these are typically used for ceremonial purposes, parades, or community patrols. CSP police motorcycles are painted black with text identifying them as state trooper units on the sides and front windshield. CSP police helicopters use a livery of navy blue, black, maroon, and dark brown.

The CSP uses radar, lidar, and VASCAR systems for speed enforcement.

In September 2022, the CSP used a helicopter from the Massachusetts National Guard to locate illegal cannabis cultivation sites.

== Rank structure ==
Title	Insignia
Colonel	
Lieutenant Colonel	
Major	
Captain	
Lieutenant	
Master Sergeant	
Sergeant	
Trooper First Class	
Trooper	

== Fallen officers ==
Since the establishment of the Connecticut State Police, 26 troopers, and 1 K9 have died in the line of duty.

Officer	Date of death	Details
Pearle E. Roberts	November 25, 1922	Motorcycle accident
Bartholomew M. Skelly	November 14, 1925	Motorcycle accident
Irving H. Nelson	April 6, 1928	Gunfire
Lloyd J. Eukers	July 21, 1928	Motorcycle accident
Stanley C. Hellberg	June 1, 1929	Motorcycle accident
Leonard H. Watson	October 22, 1932	Motorcycle accident
Charles F. Hill	November 6, 1941	Vehicular assault
Edward P. Jesmonth	July 20, 1943	Automobile accident
Kenneth W. Stevens	June 6, 1944	Heart attack
Frank A. Starkel	July 19, 1948	Accidental
Ernest J. Morse	February 13, 1953	Gunfire
James W. Lambert	October 29, 1960	Struck by vehicle
Joseph M. Stoba Jr.	August 6, 1962	Gunfire
Carl P. Moller	February 13, 1976	Vehicular assault
Thomas F. Carney	December 6, 1982	Struck by vehicle
James H. Savage	January 22, 1986	Struck by vehicle
Jorge A. Agosto	November 22, 1989	Struck by vehicle
Russell A. Bagshaw	June 5, 1991	Gunfire
Edward W. Truelove	November 13, 1992	Automobile accident
Phillip A. Mingione	May 25, 1994	Struck by vehicle
Kenneth Hall	September 2, 2010	Struck by vehicle
Kevin Miller	March 29, 2018	Automobile accident
Walter Greene Jr.	May 31, 2018	9/11 related illness
Eugene K. Barron, Jr.	May 25, 2020	9/11 related illness
Brian Mohl	September 2, 2021	Weather/Natural disaster
K9 Broko	December 21, 2023	Gunfire
Aaron Pelletier	May 30, 2024	Struck by vehicle

== See also ==
- List of law enforcement agencies in Connecticut
