= Connecticut Department of Motor Vehicles =

Management of licenses and registration

Agency overview
- Jurisdiction: Government of Connecticut
- Headquarters: 60 State Street, Wethersfield, CT 06109
- Agency executive: Tony Guerrera, Commissioner
- Website: Official website

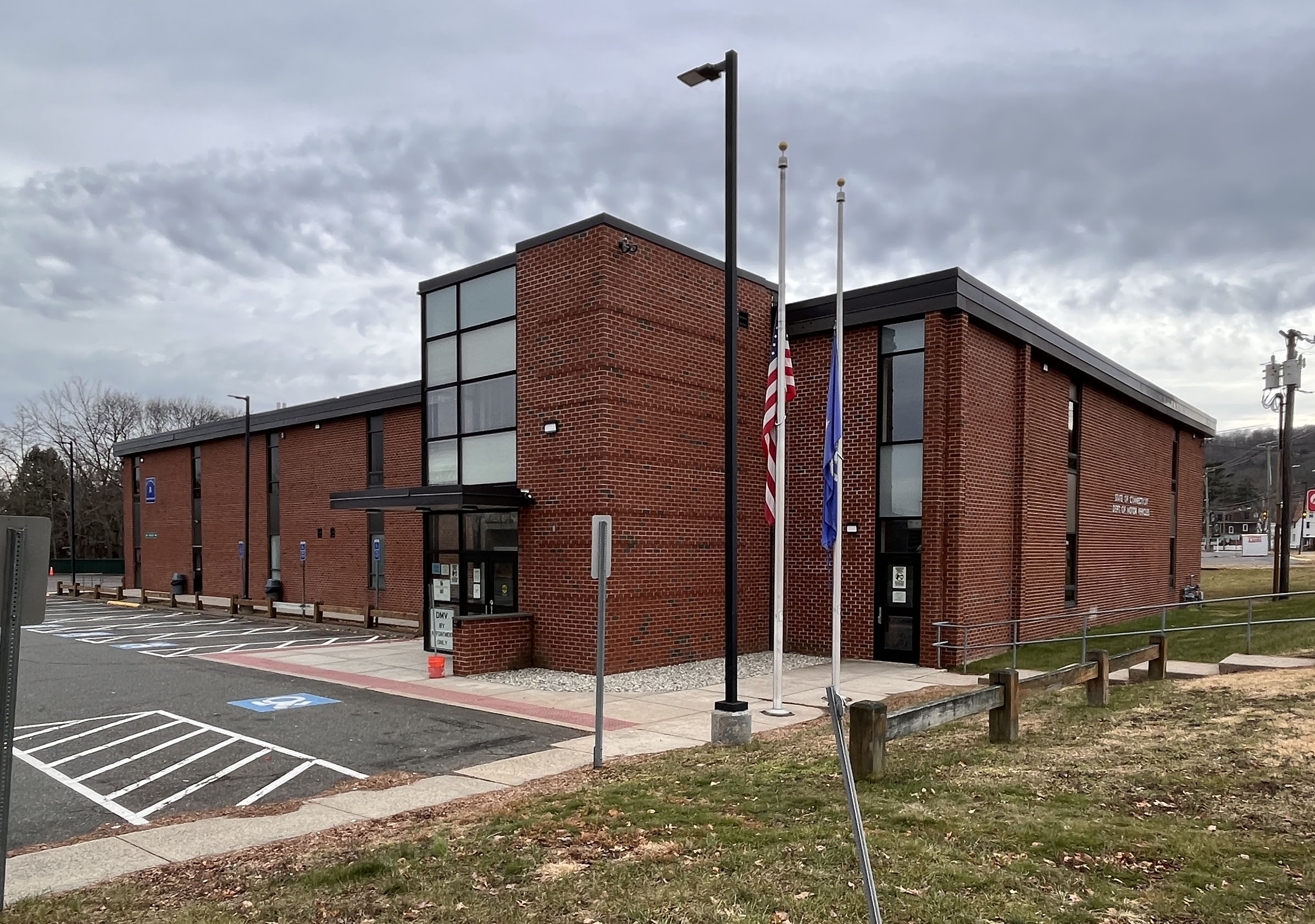
The Connecticut Department of Motor Vehicles office in Hamden, Connecticut

The Connecticut Department of Motor Vehicles is a state agency of Connecticut (in the United States) that manages state driver's licenses and vehicle registration. The agency has its headquarters in Wethersfield.

== Commercial Vehicle Safety Division (DMV Police) ==
The DMV's Commercial Vehicle Safety Division (CVSD); colloquially known as the "DMV Police" are the state's lead agency for commercial motor vehicle enforcement, a function performed in many other states by a Department of Transportation or state police agency. The division administers the federal Motor Carrier Safety Assistance Program (MCSAP) in Connecticut and is designated by statute to operate the state's commercial weigh stations. Motor vehicle inspectors are certified by the Connecticut Police Officer Standards and Training Council and have powers of arrest.

The division has statewide arrest authority in motor vehicle matters, and its inspectors are assigned to units covering auto theft, motor carrier enforcement, weigh station operations, student transportation, dealer and repairer enforcement, and criminal investigations.

Enforcement duties include truck safety and size and weight enforcement, school bus inspection, vehicle identification and auto theft investigation, registration enforcement, and traffic law enforcement. The division operates six fixed weight and inspection stations and patrols highways and secondary roads throughout the state.

Under Connecticut General Statutes § 14-163c, the Commissioner of Motor Vehicles may adopt regulations incorporating the Federal Motor Carrier Safety Regulations, and may impose civil penalties for repeat violations.

Inspection authority extends to DMV inspectors as well as state and municipal police officers who have completed federally prescribed training.
