= State police (United States) =

Police department of a U.S. state

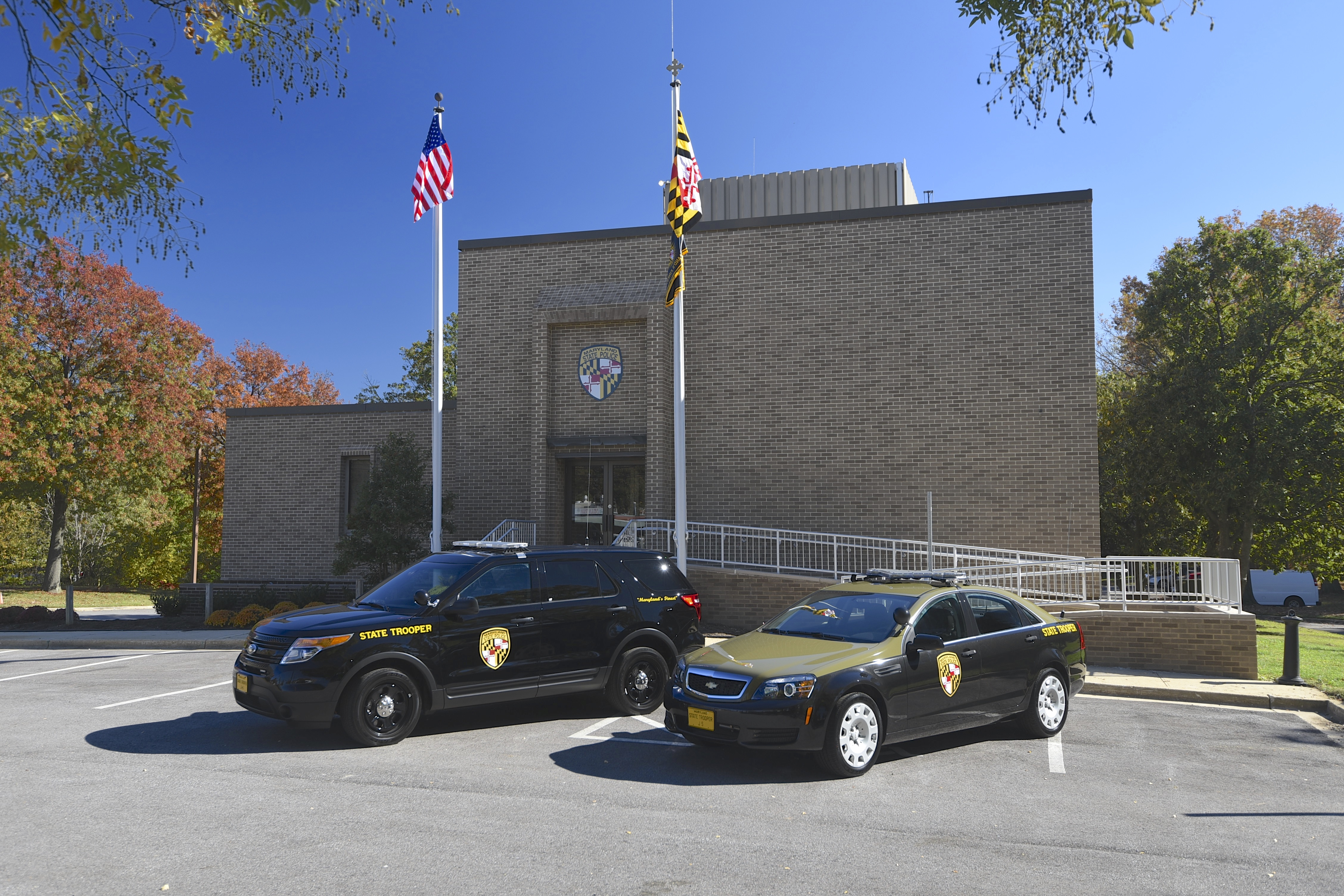
Maryland State Police, at Barrack J, Annapolis (2015)

In the United States, the state police and highway patrol is a police body unique to each 50 U.S. states: 48 contiguous states, Alaska, and Hawaii having statewide authority to conduct law enforcement activities and criminal investigations. In general, state policemen or highway patrolmen, known as state troopers or state officers, perform functions that do not fall within the jurisdiction of a county’s sheriff (Vermont being a notable exception), such as enforcing traffic laws on state highways and interstates, overseeing security of state capitol complexes, protecting governors, training new officers for local police forces too small to operate an academy and providing technological and scientific services. They also support local police and help to coordinate multi-jurisdictional task force activity in serious or complicated cases in states that grant full police powers statewide.

A general trend has been to bring all of these agencies under a state-level Department of Public Safety. Additionally, they may serve under different state departments, such as the Highway Patrol under the state Department of Transportation and the marine patrol under the Department of Natural Resources. Twenty-three U.S. states use the term "State Police." Forty-nine states have a State Police agency or its equivalent, with Hawaii being the only state with a Sheriff Division of the Hawaii Department of Law Enforcement with statewide jurisdiction.

== History ==
The Texas Rangers are the earliest form of state law enforcement in the United States, becoming an American law enforcement force following the annexation of Texas to the US in 1845. They were originally organized by Stephen F. Austin in 1823 for settlers in what was then the Mexican state of Coahuila y Tejas. The first ranger force consisted of ten men charged with providing protection from Native American attacks. Though the rangers of this era are today considered law enforcement officers, they rarely wore badges and were little more than volunteers; the Mexican military was officially in charge of law enforcement for the area. The Rangers later served as a paramilitary force during the Texas Revolution which led to the creation of the sovereign country of the Republic of Texas, under which they served from 1836 until annexation by the US in 1845. They then continued their role for the state of Texas, serving especially on the U.S.-Mexico border, and in several armed military conflicts, including the Mexican–American War and the American Civil War. They continued to fill basic law enforcement and frontier protection roles until the close of the "wild west" era. In the early 1900s, they transformed into a criminal investigative agency. The history and legacy of the Texas Rangers has spawned numerous depictions in popular culture. The colloquial image of a Texas Ranger "always [getting] their man" has likewise made the Rangers a revered and highly competitive agency within law enforcement, with fewer than 1 in 100 applicants being considered for a single position.

The Pennsylvania State Police (PSP) force emerged in the aftermath of the anthracite mine strike of 1902, in Pennsylvania. The passage of legislation on May 2, 1905, did not provoke controversy because it was quietly rushed through the mine-owner dominated legislature, but the strike-breaking role of the new police elicited strong opposition from organized labor, who likened them to the repressive Russian cossacks under the tsar. President Theodore Roosevelt, himself a former President of the New York City Police Commission, noted that the Pennsylvania State Police were intended to replace the Coal and Iron Police, a private company police used primarily to counter union organizing:

When the laboring masses rocked in mortal combat with the vested interest, the State stepped in to prove her impartial justice by selling her authority into the vested interests' hands! ... whenever the miners elected to go out on strike ... they invariably found the power of the State bought, paid for, and fighting as a partisan on their employers' side. Nor was there any attempt made to do this monstrous thing under mask of decency.

Roosevelt's assertions notwithstanding, the Iron and Coal Police continued to operate in increasing numbers into the 1930s.

The formation of the New York State Police (NYSP) force on April 11, 1917, was done amidst controversy and public debate, and the legislation creating it passed by only one vote. Proponents of a proposal to establish the New York State Police depicted state police as the policemen-soldiers of an impartial state in labor disputes, and saw in them no gendarmerie, intimating that labor's opposition was "un-American". Instead, they were to be more like the trooper police of Australia, both of which had a much more respectable reputation than the maligned forces evoked by trade unionists. Outside of Pennsylvania, the new state police were also established to free up the National Guard from strikebreaking duties, which was extensive in the later 19th century and early decades of the 20th.

The strikebreaking demands on the New York state police decreased over time and their mandate modernized with the creation of the inter-state highway system and proliferation of the automobile. While the early "state troopers", as the name implies, were mounted troops, by mid-century they were fully motorized police forces..

Two years later on June 19, 1919 the newly formed West Virginia State Police (WVSP) was formed to combat and put down the rising violence of organized labor in the coal and mining industry. 3 West Virginia State Troopers were killed in the two years it took to put down the uprising. The WVSP was also used very heavily during the prohibition era for hunting down and destroying moonshine stills/operations throughout the mountainous and rural areas of West Virginia, which resulted in some deaths of WVSP Troopers. WVSP is the 4th oldest State Police agency in the United States of America. Governor John Jacob Cornwell was insistent upon having a State Police force which he said, "was mandatory in order for him to uphold the laws of our state." Part of the compromise was the name of the organization: "West Virginia Department of Public Safety" was the official name until 1995 when the name was changed to "West Virginia State Police" during the legislative session.

The federal government in the 1920s was generally distrustful of southern states establishing state police, fearing the agencies would be used to oppress black citizens from voting and exercising their civil rights. Additionally, southern states were non-union and had little need for such state police, as did some northern mining states. During this time the Ku Klux Klan (KKK) was also on a resurgence. In response, the southern states established agencies to regulate the increasing problems related to motor vehicles and highway safety, such as licensure compliance, vehicle registration, speed enforcement, vehicular equipment safety, vehicle insurance laws and drunken driving. Over time, these agencies were vested with general police powers, but remained focused primarily on highway and vehicular law enforcement.

North Carolina for example established a DMV motor vehicle theft investigations unit in 1921 to combat a rising problem with car theft, but the state realized a need for a larger, uniformed highway patrol agency to solely enforce traffic laws statewide. Local NC sheriffs did not have the personnel, resources or training to do so during that era, but did not want their powers usurped by a per-se state police agency. Thus, the NC State Highway Patrol was established on July 1, 1929. Its original command staff was sent to the Pennsylvania State Police Academy for training. Upon completion, these lieutenants and a captain returned to NC and started the SHP with a training camp for new recruits at Camp Glenn, a WW1 abandoned army post in Morehead City. Chartered to enforce traffic laws only, in the early 1930s the NCSHP had added in its charter that it had powers to deal with among other crimes, bank robbery. This was done at the request of the federal government, so that local states could assist the FBI during the rash of bank robberies in the gangster era of the Great Depression in the 1930s. During this time, the FBI issued 100 spare Thompson .45 caliber sub-machineguns to the NCSHP, to prepare NC troopers to help the FBI combat the rash epidemic of bank robberies at the time. The expected scores of bank robberies never occurred in NC, instead being an epidemic confined to the sparsely-populated and vast areas of the Southwest, Midwest and Great Plains states from Texas to Minnesota. The guns were kept in the main SHP armory in Raleigh and never issued. The weapons were returned to the Federal government in the mid-1980s.

In 1919 Virginia established a motor vehicle enforcement agency and it was established as state police in 1932. Kentucky established a highway patrol in 1935 and it was established as state police in 1948, but these states, located on the border of the previous Civil War south, were more under the watchful eye of the federal government than were deeper southern states. The only deep south, former Confederate State to have a true state police agency is Louisiana. The Louisiana State Police also first started out as a highway patrol agency but in 1936 it was established as a state police, at the desire and influence of the late Governor Huey Long, who used the troopers as a powerful body guard force. Long is often called one of the most powerful Democratic politicians in US history.

== Types of state police agencies ==
In many states, the state police are known by different names: the various terms used are "State Police", "Highway Patrol", "State Highway Patrol", "State Patrol", and "State Troopers". Some agencies' names are actually misnomers with respect to the work regularly done by their members. All but two state police entities use the term "trooper" to refer to their commissioned members; California and New Mexico are the lone exceptions, using the term "officer" instead. New Mexico has commissioned and certified volunteer State Troopers in the New Mexico Mounted Patrol, a self-governing state agency, separate from the New Mexico State Police. (Until 2015, Arizona also used "officer", but has since switched to "trooper".) These titles are usually historical and do not necessarily describe the agency's function or jurisdiction. Colloquial or slang terms for a state trooper may include "troop," "statey," "stater," or—in trucker slang—"Smokey", "full-grown bear", or "Polar Bear" if the police vehicle is all white. Some regional slang terms also exist for specific agencies.

Alaska and Arkansas are the only states with both a highway patrol and a state police. The Alaska Highway Patrol is a bureau of the Alaska State Troopers while the Arkansas Highway Patrol is the uniformed patrol division of the Arkansas State Police. A separate Arkansas Highway Police exists as part of the Arkansas Department of Transportation but exists as a work-zone and commercial vehicle enforcement agency. The New Hampshire Highway Patrol, also a commercial vehicle enforcement agency, has since been merged into the New Hampshire State Police as Troop G - Commercial Vehicle Enforcement.

=== State police ===
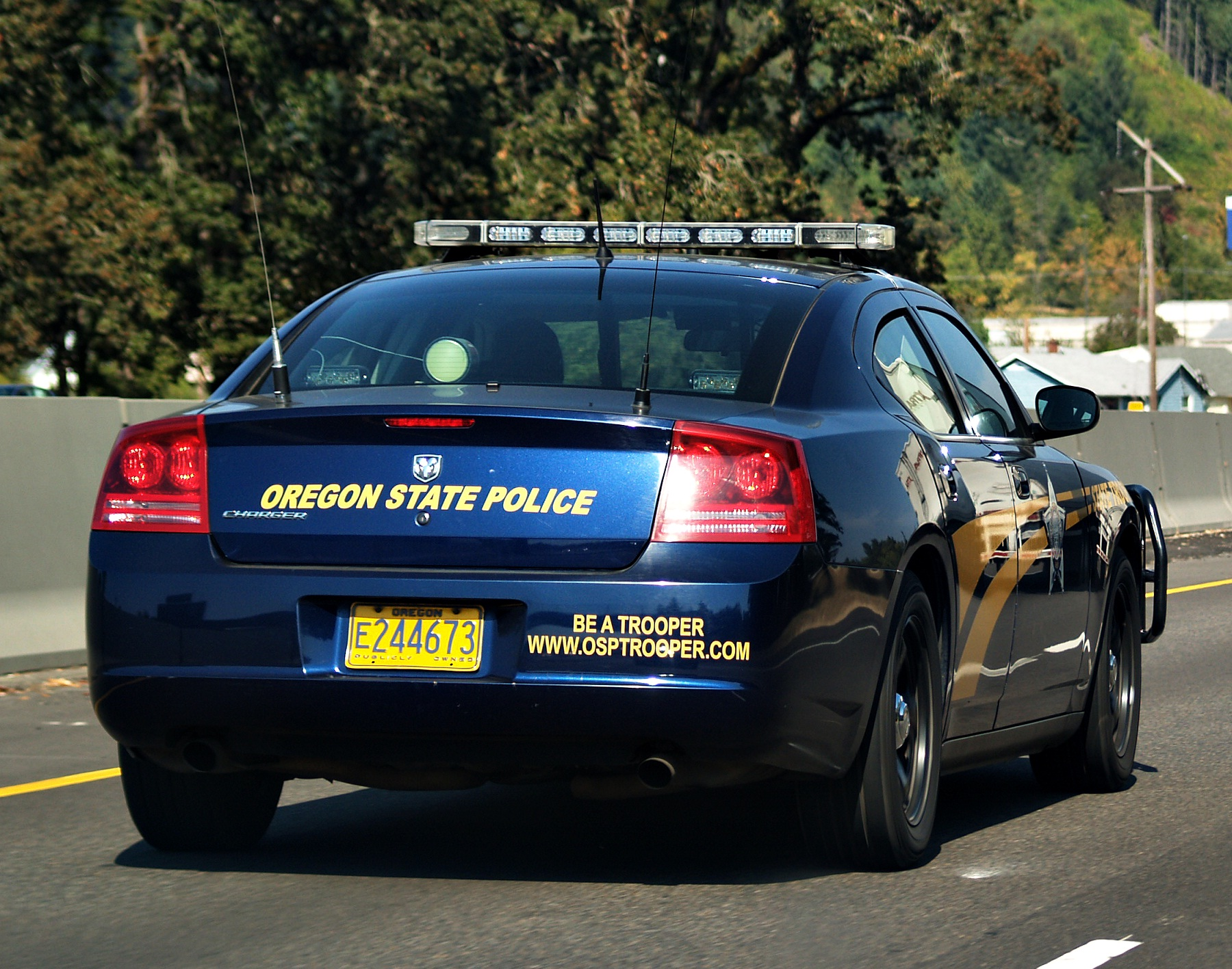
An Oregon State Police vehicle (2012)

Though many forces use the term "state police," its meaning is not consistent from agency to agency. In many places, it is a full-service law enforcement agency which responds to calls for service, investigates criminal activity, and regularly patrols high-crime areas. On the other hand, some state police agencies, despite the name, are strictly tasked with traffic enforcement, though their members usually retain full police powers; the Arkansas State Police is an example.

==== States with state police ====
- Arkansas State Police (Note: The uniformed division of the Arkansas State Police is called the Arkansas Highway Patrol)
- Connecticut State Police
- Delaware State Police
- Idaho State Police
- Illinois State Police
- Indiana State Police
- Kentucky State Police
- Louisiana State Police
- Maine State Police
- Maryland State Police
- Massachusetts State Police
- Michigan State Police
- New Hampshire State Police
- New Jersey State Police
- New Mexico State Police
- New York State Police
- Nevada State Police
- Oregon State Police
- Pennsylvania State Police
- Rhode Island State Police
- Vermont State Police
- Virginia State Police
- West Virginia State Police

=== Highway patrol and state troopers ===
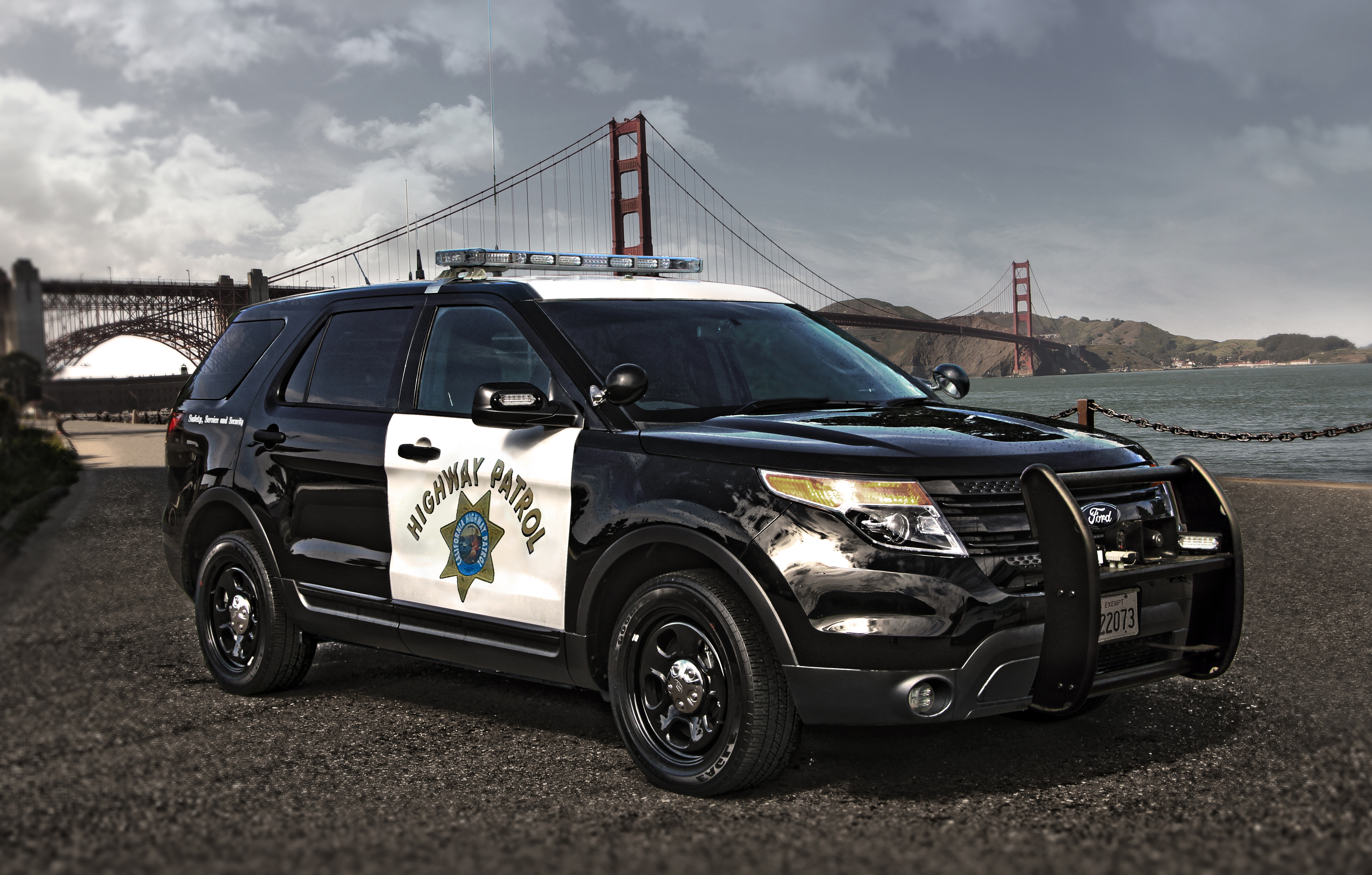
A California Highway Patrol vehicle (2015)

Several agencies use the term "highway patrol," though this name can be misleading in some cases. Some highway patrol agencies are, as their name implies, dedicated to enforcing state traffic laws on the highways; a few are full-service state police agencies which regularly respond to calls and conduct inner-city policing functions; and yet others are a bridge, focusing primarily on traffic enforcement but providing general policing services when and where necessary. Their primary concern is enforcing motor vehicle laws, but they also assist with other incidents. These include riots, prison disturbances, labor related disturbances, and providing security at sporting events.

==== States with highway patrol ====
- Alabama Highway Patrol
- Arizona Highway Patrol
- California Highway Patrol
- Florida Highway Patrol
- Kansas Highway Patrol
- Mississippi Highway Patrol
- Montana Highway Patrol
- North Dakota Highway Patrol
- Nevada Highway Patrol
- Oklahoma Highway Patrol
- South Carolina Highway Patrol
- South Dakota Highway Patrol
- Tennessee Highway Patrol
- Texas Highway Patrol
- Utah Highway Patrol
- Wyoming Highway Patrol

==== States with state highway patrol ====
- Missouri State Highway Patrol
- North Carolina State Highway Patrol
- Ohio State Highway Patrol

==== States with state patrol ====
- Colorado State Patrol
- Georgia State Patrol
- Iowa State Patrol
- Minnesota State Patrol
- Nebraska State Patrol
- Washington State Patrol
- Wisconsin State Patrol

==== States with highway police ====
- Arkansas Highway Police

==== States with state troopers ====
- Alaska State Troopers (Note: The traffic enforcement division of the Alaska State Troopers is called the Alaska Highway Patrol)

=== Statewide policing in Hawaii ===
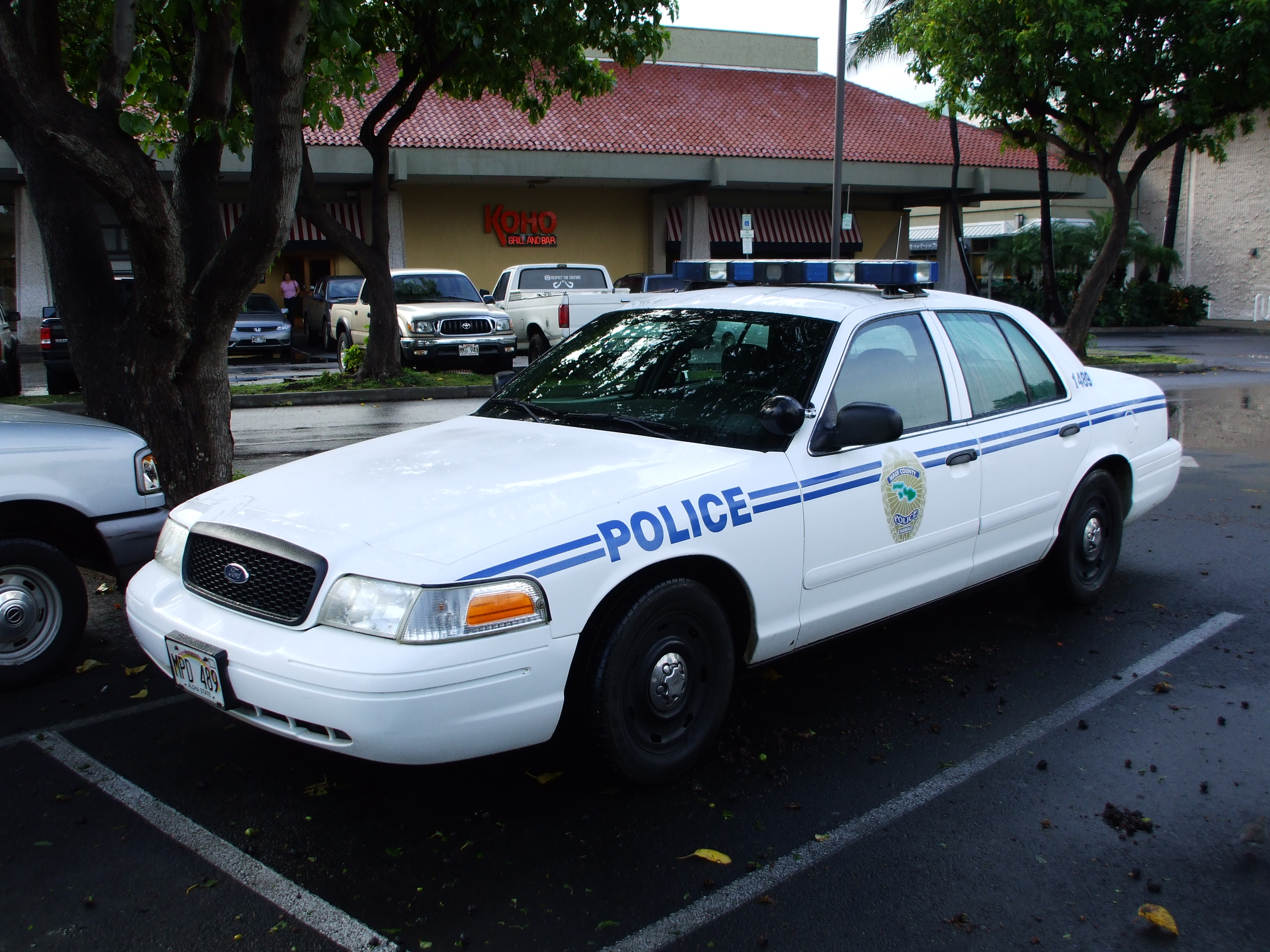
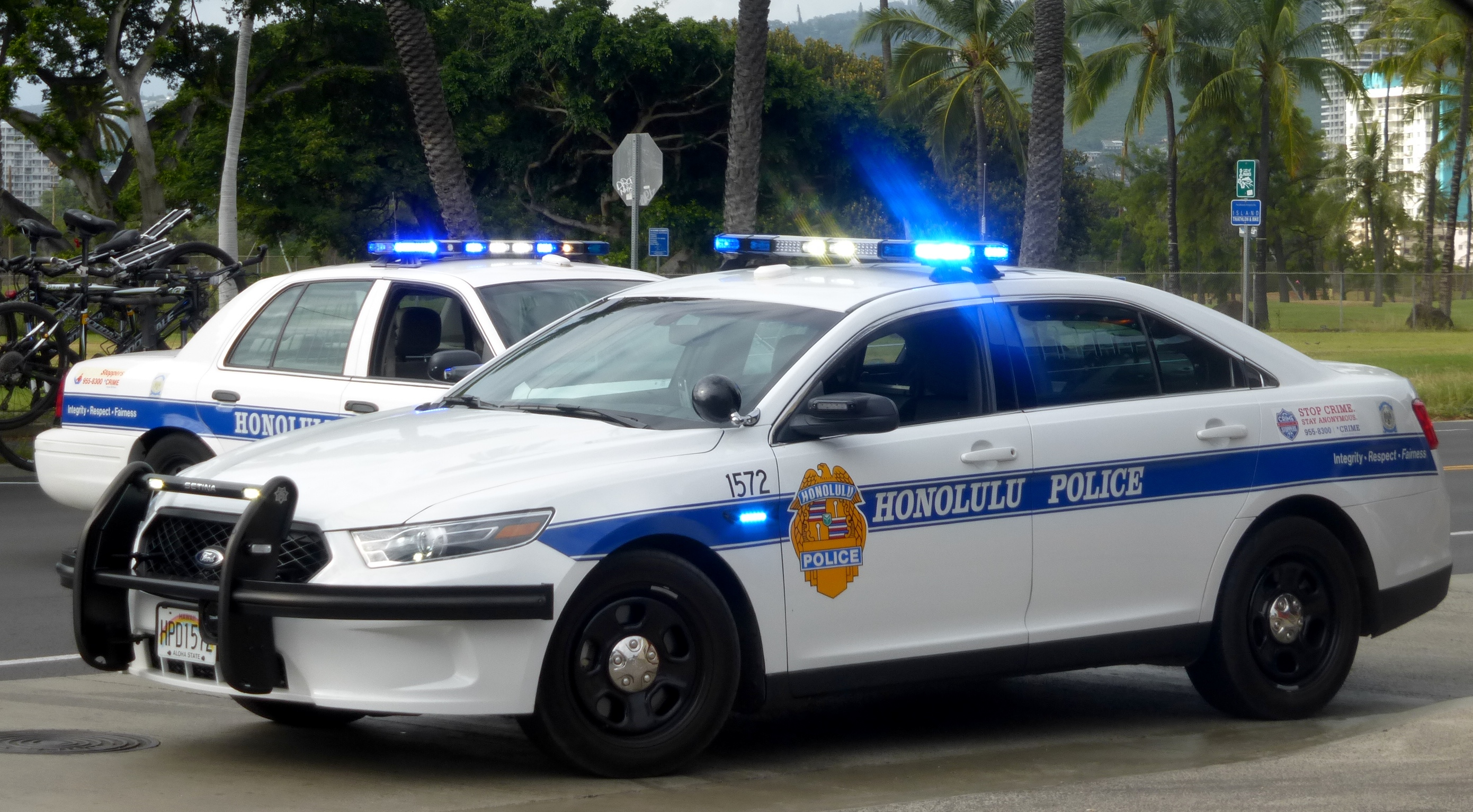
Individual county police departments in Hawaii have responsibility for the state's highway patrol functions. Maui County (left, 2007) and Honolulu County (right, 2015) police vehicles

Unlike the other 49 states and territories, Hawaii is not a contiguous area of land, but rather an archipelago, consisting primarily of eight major islands. Because of its geography, it is impossible to use roads to get from one local/municipal jurisdiction to another. As a consequence, Hawaii is the only state that does not have a specifically named state police/highway patrol force. Highway patrol functions are instead carried out within each of the state's five counties, which are served by four police forces (Kalawao County is administered as part of Maui County):

- Hawai‘i County Police Department
- Honolulu Police Department
- Kauai County Police Department
- Maui County Police Department

The Department of Law Enforcement (through its Sheriff, Narcotics, and Criminal Investigations Divisions) performs the security policing tasks usually undertaken by a dedicated state police force or capitol police agency, such as airport security, counter-narcotics, counter-terrorism, executive protection and other specialized duties since the September 2001 terrorist attacks, in addition to providing bailiffs to the judicial apparatus. The Department of the Attorney General includes an Investigations Division which assists the department’s civil, criminal, and administrative cases.

The television series Hawaii Five-O featured a fictional state police detective unit in Hawaii. This was not a uniformed police force, but instead functioned more as a state bureau of investigation.

=== Defunct state policing organisations ===
The California State Police (CSP) was a division of the California Department of General Services, and was a security police agency which merged with the California Highway Patrol in 1995; following this, the California Highway Patrol assumed security police responsibilities in addition to its highway patrol duties.

The Kentucky Highway Patrol was founded in 1936 as part of Kentucky's State Highway Department to enforce traffic laws on the state's roads. In 1948, it was abolished upon the formation of the Kentucky State Police, with all of its officers moving to the new organisation.

Pennsylvania formed a State Highway Patrol in 1923 within the Department of Highways to enforce the vehicle laws of Pennsylvania's burgeoning highway system. The State Highway Patrol was merged with the State Police on June 29, 1937.

The Texas State Police was formed during the administration of Texas Governor Edmund J. Davis on July 22, 1870, to combat crime associated with Reconstruction statewide in Texas. It worked primarily against racially based crimes, and included black police officers, which caused howls of protest from former slave owners (and future segregationists). It was dissolved by order of the legislature on April 22, 1873. The Texas Highway Patrol currently performs statewide police functions. The Texas Special Police was a statewide auxiliary police force and was also disbanded with the Texas State Police.

== Territorial police ==
Three of the five permanently inhabited territories of the United States have a police department with territory-wide authority:

- Guam Police Department
- Puerto Rico Police Department
- U.S. Virgin Islands Police Department
- American Samoa Police Department
- Northern Mariana Islands Police Department

== List of state police agencies by U.S. states ==
Agencies without parent organizations are independent agencies.

State	Police Agency	Parent Organization	Size
Alabama	Alabama Highway Patrol	Alabama Department of Public Safety	507
Alaska	Alaska State Troopers	Alaska Department of Public Safety	365
Arizona	Arizona Highway Patrol	Arizona Department of Public Safety	1,171
Arkansas	Arkansas State Police	Arkansas Department of Public Safety	586
Arkansas	Arkansas Highway Police	Arkansas Department of Transportation	210
California	California Highway Patrol	California State Transportation Agency	6,406
California	California Department of Motor Vehicles Investigations Division	California Department of Motor Vehicles	200
California	California State Parks Peace Officer	California State Parks	-
California	California Department of Justice Division of Law Enforcement (Including California Bureau of Investigation, California Bureau of Firearms, California Bureau of Narcotic Enforcement, California Bureau of Gambling Control)	California Department of Justice	-
Colorado	Colorado State Patrol	Colorado Department of Public Safety	701
Colorado	Colorado Rangers	Colorado Rangers Law Enforcement Shared Reserve	84
Connecticut	Connecticut State Police	Connecticut Department of Emergency Services and Public Protection	875
Delaware	Delaware State Police	Delaware Department of Public Safety and Homeland Security	706
Florida	Florida Highway Patrol	Florida Department of Highway Safety and Motor Vehicles	1,982
Georgia	Georgia State Patrol	Georgia Department of Public Safety	845
Hawaii	Hawaii State Sheriff	Hawaii Department of Law Enforcement	2,380
Idaho	Idaho State Police		379
Illinois	Illinois State Police		1,803
Indiana	Indiana State Police		1,279
Iowa	Iowa State Patrol	Iowa Department of Public Safety	455
Kansas	Kansas Highway Patrol		478
Kentucky	Kentucky State Police	Kentucky Justice and Public Safety Cabinet	1,006
Louisiana	Louisiana State Police	Louisiana Department of Public Safety	1,200
Maine	Maine State Police	Maine Department of Public Safety	330
Maryland	Maryland State Police		1,474
Massachusetts	Massachusetts State Police	Massachusetts Executive Office of Public Safety and Security	2,500
Michigan	Michigan State Police		3,000
Minnesota	Minnesota State Patrol	Minnesota Department of Public Safety	625
Mississippi	Mississippi Highway Patrol	Mississippi Department of Public Safety	650
Missouri	Missouri State Highway Patrol	Missouri Department of Public Safety	952
Montana	Montana Highway Patrol	Montana Department of Justice	243
Nebraska	Nebraska State Patrol		482
Nevada	Nevada State Police	Nevada Department of Public Safety	389
New Hampshire	New Hampshire State Police	New Hampshire Department of Safety	405
New Jersey	New Jersey State Police	New Jersey Department of Law and Public Safety	2,800
New Mexico	New Mexico State Police	New Mexico Department of Public Safety	671
New Mexico	New Mexico Mounted Patrol		98
New York	New York State Police		5,009
North Carolina	North Carolina State Highway Patrol	North Carolina Department of Public Safety	1,670
North Dakota	North Dakota Highway Patrol	North Dakota State Cabinet	159
Ohio	Ohio State Highway Patrol	Ohio Department of Public Safety	1,598
Oklahoma	Oklahoma Highway Patrol	Oklahoma Department of Public Safety	753
Oregon	Oregon State Police		480
Pennsylvania	Pennsylvania State Police		4,841
Rhode Island	Rhode Island State Police	Rhode Island Department of Public Safety	228
South Carolina	South Carolina Highway Patrol	South Carolina Department of Public Safety	955
South Dakota	South Dakota Highway Patrol	South Dakota Department of Public Safety	193
Tennessee	Tennessee Highway Patrol	Tennessee Department of Safety	1,083
Texas	Texas Highway Patrol	Texas Department of Public Safety	2,802
Utah	Utah Highway Patrol	Utah Department of Public Safety	458
Vermont	Vermont State Police	Vermont Department of Public Safety	334
Virginia	Virginia State Police	Virginia Secretariat of Public Safety	2,118
Washington	Washington State Patrol		1,100
West Virginia	West Virginia State Police	West Virginia Department of Military Affairs and Public Safety	628
Wisconsin	Wisconsin State Patrol	Wisconsin Department of Transportation	512
Wyoming	Wyoming Highway Patrol	Wyoming Department of Transportation	208

== Other state police agencies ==
- State Bureau of Investigation (SBI): the state's equivalent to the Federal Bureau of Investigation.
- State bureau of narcotics the state-level counterpart to the U.S Drug Enforcement Administration.
- Department of Public Safety (DPS) exist in 31 states (Alabama, Alaska, Arizona, Arkansas, Colorado, Connecticut, Delaware, Georgia, Hawaii, Iowa, Kentucky, Louisiana, Maine, Maryland, Massachusetts, Minnesota, Mississippi, Missouri, New Hampshire, New Jersey, New Mexico, Nevada, North Carolina, Ohio, Oklahoma, Rhode Island, South Carolina, South Dakota, Tennessee, Texas, Utah, and Vermont) and the territory of Puerto Rico; often these are umbrella organizations which provide oversight and coordination over various state or territory-level police agencies, such as State Police, State Bureau of Investigation, or Highway Patrols.
- State Sheriff:
  - Hawaii, where the State of Hawaii Sheriff's Office, part of the Hawaii Department of Public Safety, serves as the statewide law enforcement agency.
  - Rhode Island, the Rhode Island State Sheriff's Department is assigned to various job functions within Rhode Island's four County Court facilities (Providence County, Kent County, Newport County and Washington County). The functions of the State Sheriff's Department include Courtroom/Judicial Security, Court Facility and Cellblock Operation, Inmate Transportation, Interstate Extraditions, Interstate Inmate Transfers, Writ Service and Body Attachments.
- State Marshal (Connecticut): The functions of the State Marshals Office include Courtroom/Judicial Security (bailiffs), Court Facility and Cellblock Operation, Inmate Transportation, Interstate Extraditions, Interstate Inmate Transfers, Writ Service and Body Attachments.
- Motor Carrier Enforcement: another organization with many various titles and may be part of the actual State Police or Highway Patrol. Many belong their state's Department of Transportation or even the Secretary of State. These agencies conduct commercial vehicle enforcement and enforce the Federal Motor Carrier Safety Assistance Program (MCSAP) as mandated by the Federal Motor Carrier Safety Administration (FMCSA). They conduct safety inspections of commercial motor vehicles (primarily trucks and buses), inspects highway shipments of hazardous materials, and performs compliance reviews (safety performance audits) on motor carriers. The DPS adopts and enforces driver and vehicle safety regulations and hazardous materials regulations as part of this program. Both the Arkansas Highway Police and the New Hampshire Highway Patrols are motor carrier enforcement agencies.
- Marine Patrol: The state water police.
- State Capitol Police: Protect state capitols and government buildings. Currently utilized in Connecticut, Delaware, Florida, Georgia, Maryland, Mississippi, Nevada, North Carolina and Wisconsin.
- Game Wardens: Charged to enforce state hunting, and fishing laws. Most Game Wardens can also enforce all state laws (traffic, drugs, etc.). In some states, they can be the enforcement arm of an agency or a division of an umbrella law enforcement agency. Examples: Alaska Wildlife Troopers, California Department of Fish and Wildlife, Colorado Parks and Wildlife.
- State Fire Marshal: Statewide office that generally deals with fire safety code, fire and arson investigation, incident analysis, and public education.
- State Park Police: California State Park Rangers, Maryland, New Jersey, New York, Florida Park Police.
- Colorado Rangers: Colorado is currently the only state with a statewide shared reserve that commissions fully authorized peace officers as force multipliers to other agencies throughout the state.
- Florida Department of Law Enforcement: In 1967, the Florida Legislature merged the responsibilities of several state criminal justice organizations to create the Bureau of Law Enforcement. The Bureau began with 94 positions, headed by a Commissioner who reported to the Governor, certain Cabinet members, two Sheriffs, and one Chief of Police. In July 1969, after government restructuring, the Bureau became the Florida Department of Law Enforcement (FDLE).
- Illinois Secretary of State Police: The Illinois Secretary of State Police monitors amongst other things handicap parking violations.
- State University System: A state university system in the United States is a group of public universities supported by an individual state. It may consist of several institutions, each with its own identity as a university with its own police department (university police)

== See also ==
- Highway patrol
- State bureau of investigation
- Police uniforms of the United States
- List of U.S. state and local law enforcement agencies
