= List of United States state and local law enforcement agencies =

This is a list of U.S. state and local law enforcement agencies — local, regional, special and statewide government agencies (state police) of the U.S. states, of the federal district, and of the territories that provide law enforcement duties, including investigations, prevention and patrol functions. In addition, the Attorney General's office of each state may have their own investigators.

The Bureau of Justice Statistics conducted a census of state and local law enforcement agencies every four years 1992–2008.

== States and DC ==
- List of law enforcement agencies in Alabama
- List of law enforcement agencies in Alaska
- List of law enforcement agencies in Arizona
- List of law enforcement agencies in Arkansas
- List of law enforcement agencies in California
- List of law enforcement agencies in Colorado
- List of law enforcement agencies in Connecticut
- List of law enforcement agencies in Delaware
- List of law enforcement agencies in Florida
- List of law enforcement agencies in Georgia
- List of law enforcement agencies in Hawaii
- List of law enforcement agencies in Idaho
- List of law enforcement agencies in Illinois
- List of law enforcement agencies in Indiana
- List of law enforcement agencies in Iowa
- List of law enforcement agencies in Kansas
- List of law enforcement agencies in Kentucky
- List of law enforcement agencies in Louisiana
- List of law enforcement agencies in Maine
- List of law enforcement agencies in Maryland
- List of law enforcement agencies in Massachusetts
- List of law enforcement agencies in Michigan
- List of law enforcement agencies in Minnesota
- List of law enforcement agencies in Mississippi
- List of law enforcement agencies in Missouri
- List of law enforcement agencies in Montana
- List of law enforcement agencies in Nebraska
- List of law enforcement agencies in Nevada
- List of law enforcement agencies in New Hampshire
- List of law enforcement agencies in New Jersey
- List of law enforcement agencies in New Mexico
- List of law enforcement agencies in New York
- List of law enforcement agencies in North Carolina
- List of law enforcement agencies in North Dakota
- List of law enforcement agencies in Ohio
- List of law enforcement agencies in Oklahoma
- List of law enforcement agencies in Oregon
- List of law enforcement agencies in Pennsylvania
- List of law enforcement agencies in Rhode Island
- List of law enforcement agencies in South Carolina
- List of law enforcement agencies in South Dakota
- List of law enforcement agencies in Tennessee
- List of law enforcement agencies in Texas
- List of law enforcement agencies in Utah
- List of law enforcement agencies in Vermont
- List of law enforcement agencies in Virginia
- List of law enforcement agencies in Washington (state)
- List of law enforcement agencies in Washington, D.C.
- List of law enforcement agencies in West Virginia
- List of law enforcement agencies in Wisconsin
- List of law enforcement agencies in Wyoming

== Territories ==
- Law enforcement in American Samoa
- Law enforcement in Guam
- Law enforcement in the Northern Mariana Islands
- Law enforcement in Puerto Rico
- Law enforcement in the United States Virgin Islands

== See also ==
- Law enforcement in the United States
- Federal law enforcement agencies in the United States
- State troopers (United States)
- County sheriff’s offices (United States)
- Municipal police departments in the United States
