= Hawaii police =

Hawaii police may refer to:

- Hawaii County Police Department, the police department of Hawaii County
- Hawaii Department of Law Enforcement, the State of Hawaii's law enforcement agency
