= Jamaican National Road Championships =

National road cycling championships in Jamaica

Race details
- Date: June
- Discipline: Road
- Type: One-day race

The Jamaican National Road Championships are held annually to decide the cycling champions in both the road race and time trial discipline, across various categories.

== Men ==
=== Road race ===
Year	Winner	Second	Third
2006	Dean Martin	Marlowe Rodman	Tyrone Edwards
2007	Linford Blackwood	Oneil Sinclair	Oneil Samuels
2010	Oneil Samuels	Marlowe Rodman	Lionel Stewart
2011	Shaquille Sinclair	Marlowe Rodman	Tinga Turner
2012	Linford Blackwood	Thailer Hill	Shaquille Sinclair
2013	Oshane Williams	Peter Thompson	Thailer Hill
2014	Oneil Samuels	Oshane Williams	Mario Brooks
2015	Oneil Samuels	Peter Thompson	Clavian Williams
2016	Oshane Williams	Marlowe Rodman	Danzie Stewart
2017	Oshane Williams	Shaquille Sinclair	Clavian Williams
2018	Russell Small	Oniel Sinclair	Jemar Brissett
2019	Russell Small	Mark Williams	Obrian Madouri

=== Time trial ===
Year	Winner	Second	Third
2006	Alden Clunis	Richard Bowen	Tinga Turner
2007	Alden Clunis	Tinga Turner	Lionel Stewart
2010	Oneil Samuels	Tinga Turner	Leighton Anderson
2011	Michael Daley	Marlowe Rodman	Horace McFarlane
2012	Peter Thompson	Linford Blackwood	Claveland Sharpe
2013	Peter Thompson	Thailer Hill	Tinga Turner
2014	Andre Jackson	Akeem Wilson	Dean Robertson
2015	Peter Thompson	Russell Small	Danzie Stewart
2016	Peter Thompson	Clavian Williams	Daniel Palmer
2017	Peter Thompson	Clavian Williams	Kevin Lyons
2018	Kevin Lyons	Jassette Bromfield	Mordecai Baines
2019	Phillip McCatty	Tinga Turner	Daniel Palmer

== Women ==
Year	Road Race	Time Trial
2008	Iona Wynter-Parks	
2013	Rachel Gooden	Bianca Hernould
2014	Dahlia Palmer	Jennifer Hilton
2018		Neisha Codrington Ingram
2019		Michelle McNally
