= List of killings by law enforcement officers in the United States, March 2025 =

This is a list of people reported killed by non-military law enforcement officers in the United States in March 2025, whether in the line of duty or not, and regardless of reason or method. The listing documents the occurrence of a death, making no implications regarding wrongdoing or justification on the part of the person killed or officer involved. Killings are arranged by date of the incident that caused death. Different death dates, if known, are noted in the description. The table below lists 105 people.

== March 2025 ==
Date	Name (age) of deceased	Race	Location	Description
2025-03-31	Walter Fitzwater (65)	Unknown	Watford City, North Dakota	McKenzie County Deputies responded to a domestic violence report. Upon arrival, Fitzwater told the police that he had a gun. Deputies tased and shot him after he continued to approach them.
2025-03-31	Dyshan Best (38)	Black	Bridgeport, Connecticut	Police responded to reports of a street fight involving weapons and pulled over a vehicle. Best, the driver, exited and fled on foot, and officers shot him in a driveway following a chase after he displayed an object that appeared to be a gun. A 9mm handgun was recovered from the scene. The footage was released. An ambulance was called to take Best to the hospital, but at the urging of officers on-scene, it was used to transport an officer who said she was having an anxiety attack. Another ambulance was called, which took Best to the hospital.
2025-03-31	Nathaniel Altman (38)	Black	Colorado Springs, Colorado	CSPD responded to reports of a man breaking into vehicles and threatening a person with a gun. Upon arrival, the suspect exited the vehicle with a firearm. An officer then fatally shot him.
2025-03-30	Daniel W. Curtin Sr. (72)	White	LaSalle, Illinois	LaSalle and Peru officers responded to a report of a suicidal subject with a gun. Upon arrival, the man fired the gun toward the air and retreated inside the house. Police tried to de-escalate the situation for 90 minutes. During which he fired at the police and pointed the gun at them before being shot. The footage and police report are released.
2025-03-30	James Andrew Evans (57)	Unknown	James City County, Virginia	James City County Police initially responded to a report about Evans assaulted a woman. Police later located him in a parking lot and killed him in a shootout.
2025-03-30	Corin Mitchell Skinner (33)	White	Saginaw, Michigan	Skinner, a knife-wielding man, was threatening "suicide by cop" when officers responded to the 911 call. Tasers failed to work and officers were forced to shoot and kill him. Officers were justified by prosecutors and the video was released.
2025-03-30	Alquan Suydam (28)	Black	Jacksonville, Florida	Jacksonville deputies shot and killed Suydam, who reportedly punched his pregnant girlfriend and pointed a gun at them.
2025-03-29	Kenneth Christopher Cook (36)	White	Stuart, Florida	Officers responded to a man stalking a woman with a knife at a residential complex. Cook charged at an officer with a knife and was shot and killed by the officer.
2025-03-29	Eric Newell (51)	White	Hartford, Maine	An 80-year-old man called police to report a domestic dispute with Newell, his stepson. When deputies arrived, Newell allegedly approached them with a knife, and deputies fatally shot him.
2025-03-28	Revail Murphy (36)	Black	Turrell, Arkansas	Murphy led Waldenburg police and Arkansas State Police on a pursuit. At some point, troopers performed PIT maneuver on the vehicle to terminate the chase. Murphy was ejected from the vehicle and died two days later. Murphy has active warrants in Shelby County for evading arrest and violation of the sex offender registry. This is the third time in a week a pursuit involving ASP troopers ended in death.
2025-03-27	Brayden M. Robinson (18)	White	St. Joseph, Missouri	During a police vehicle pursuit of a stolen vehicle, one of the occupants allegedly shot at police, striking several buildings, but no officers. The vehicle crashed, and a 29-year-old man was arrested. Robinson reportedly fled and was shot to death by police in unclear circumstances.
2025-03-27	Edmond Johnson (29)	Unknown	Carroll County, Virginia	Carroll County Sheriff's Office responded to a shooting incident involving the suspect, Johnson. When they found the suspect's vehicle, a shootout occurred, which left two deputies shot and Johnson killed.
2025-03-27	James E. Walter (54)	White	Warsaw, Kentucky	Walter allegedly fired a gun into the air at a trailer park, then continued shooting inside his trailer and threatened to kill police officers that responded to the scene. He was shot and killed by Kentucky State Police officers after he reportedly exited his trailer and brandished a firearm.
2025-03-26	Christian Black (25)	Black	Dayton, Ohio	Black was booked in Montgomery County Jail after crashing a stolen vehicle during a robbery on March 23, 2025. When he was in jail, he reportedly struck his head on his cell door and fought with several jail staffs. Tasers and pepper sprays were used during the fight. He was eventually being sent to a hospital and died after his situation worsened.
2025-03-26	Jonathan Lozano (27)	Unknown	Walnut Park, California	Officers located the suspect in an armed robbery and shot him to death in unclear circumstances. Police say two pistols and ammunition were recovered from the suspect.
2025-03-26	Rick David Oliver (61)	White	Olivehurst, California	Several law enforcement agencies were serving a search warrant related to a drug trafficking investigation. Oliver, a felon, shot and killed Marysville SWAT team Officer Osmar Rodarte before being killed by returned fire. The footage was released by district attorney.
2025-03-25	Laterrika Woods (29)	Black	Hazen, Arkansas	Arkansas state troopers chased a truck along Interstate 40 after the driver reportedly committed a traffic violation in Lonoke County. A trooper used a PIT maneuver when the vehicle entered Hazen, causing the truck to crash into a ditch and eject its four passengers, one of whom, Woods, died. The driver of the truck was charged with murder.
2025-03-25	Jesse William Wright Sr. (75)	White	Travelers Rest, South Carolina	A Greenville County deputy that responded to a disturbance shot and killed Wright, who pointed a shotgun at them. The footage was released.
2025-03-25	Louis Michael Hill (26)	Unknown	Florence, Alabama	FPD and Lauderdale County deputies were dispatched to a welfare checked on a suspect who reportedly had threatened to rob a bank. A pursuit ensued after they saw Hill leave the bank. After the chase, Hill shot and wounded a bystander and an officer before being shot and killed by police.
2025-03-25	Eric Kulakow (58)	White	San Diego, California	The suspect reportedly pointed a semi-automatic pistol at a pest control worker before police arrived. When SWAT team members attempted to evacuated the worker who barricaded himself, the suspect pointed the pistol at officers before being shot dead by two police snipers.
2025-03-24	Matthew A. Brown (30)	White	Barneveld, New York	Brown lunged toward a state trooper's handgun and was being restrained and handcuffed by the trooper. He became unresponsive before the medics arrived and was later pronounced deceased.
2025-03-24	Willie Joe Larry-Purdiman (23)	Black	Little Rock, Arkansas	U.S. Marshals tracked Purdiman, who had a warrant for his arrest, to a Walmart. Purdiman allegedly fled on foot while firing shots at the officers. After he reportedly ignored commands to drop his weapon, Purdiman was shot and killed by marshals. One officer was injured in the pursuit.
2025-03-23	unidentified male	Unknown	Northport, Washington	Steven County deputies were serving a felony arrest warrant on a suspect. The suspect was fatally shot after exiting his home with a gun and ran away. Less-lethal devices were used on him but they were ineffective.
2025-03-23	Max Dominguez (27)	Hispanic	San Antonio, Texas	Officers responded to an assault in progress and found Dominguez reportedly assaulting his girlfriend. After Dominguez fell into his bed, an officer shot and killed him when he allegedly attempted to stand up with a machete.
2025-03-22	Cortez Jerome George (21)	Black	Jackson, Mississippi	A shooting occurred after a confrontation between two parties at St. Paddy's Day parade, killing one and injured seven others. One of the shooter, identified as Michael McLeod, was an off-duty officer of University of Mississippi Medical Center at the time. He and his brother were charged with murder and aggravated assault.
2025-03-22	Adam Thomas Peeler (36)	White	Murfreesboro, Tennessee	During a domestic incident investigation, Peeler pointed a shotgun at officers before being shot at by them. He retreated into the house which led to a barricade situation. A SWAT team later found him dead inside.
2025-03-22	Robert Fanello (68)	White	Las Vegas, Nevada	Police responded to reports of an armed suicidal individual and heard a gunshot from inside a home. Following a stand-off, an officer shot the man when he allegedly pointed a gun at them.
2025-03-21	unidentified male	Unknown	Lenore, West Virginia	Mingo County Deputies responded to a shots fired call. They shot and killed the suspect after he threatened them with a gun.
2025-03-21	Michael Ray Richard II (39)	Unknown	Needles, California	Richard, a burglary suspect, was pursued by police on foot before allegedly pulling out a handgun and firing the gun during a struggle with deputies. Officers shot him dead. A deputy sustained minor injuries during the incident.
2025-03-21	Aleksandr Lanis (38)	White	Fenton, Missouri	Police attempted to serve an arrest warrant on Lanis, a former doctor at Mercy Hospital St. Louis, for first-degree harassment. A struggle occurred, and officers shot Lanis after he pulled out a gun.
2025-03-21	Miles Winn Dignean (32)	White	Constantia, New York	Police responded to reports of a man having a psychotic episode at a home. Dignean and a trooper struggled, during which he hit the trooper with a metal object. A trooper shot and killed Dignean.
2025-03-20	Joe Versie (54)	Unknown	Gilmore, Arkansas	According to Arkansas State Police, a pursuit started after a deputy attempted to pull Versie over for reckless driving. ASP troopers later joined the chase and eventually performed PIT maneuver on his vehicle to terminate the pursuit. Versie's vehicle stopped and engulfed into fire. Troopers, Poinsett County deputies and Harrisburg police officers shot and killed him after he tried to reached for a weapon.
2025-03-20	James Collier (19)	Unknown	Moore, Oklahoma	Moore Police responded to a stabbing incident which left two victims injured. When they arrived, the suspect emerged from a house and approached them with a large machete. Officers shot and killed him after he did not follow commands.
2025-03-20	Jose Medina (57)	Unknown	Denver, Colorado	Denver Police responded to a report about a man armed with a gun. When officers ordered the suspect to drop the gun, he made a threatening gesture and they fatally shot him. The gun was found to be a replica.
2025-03-20	Messiah Deasure-Shamyl McMillian (27)	Unknown	Chandler, Arizona	Chandler Police responded to an armed domestic violence report. The suspect reportedly ran at the responding officers with a knife and was shot to death.
2025-03-20	Devon Smith (43)	Unknown	Chicago, Illinois	Chicago PD responded to a domestic incident in Pullman neighborhood. They found an armed man and woman inside. When they attempted to get the woman out of the room, the suspect reportedly pointed his gun at them. They shot and killed him in response.
2025-03-20	unidentified male	Unknown	Saltville, Virginia	A Smyth County Sheriff's Office deputy shot and killed a man who reportedly approached the officer with a handgun.
2025-03-20	Aaron Rainey (36)	Black	Philadelphia, Pennsylvania	Police saw Rainey running through traffic naked in Northeast Philadelphia and took him to the hospital after he agreed to be voluntarily committed. When they arrived, Rainey allegedly attacked an officer and stole his firearm. The officer's partner shot Rainey multiple times, killing him. The first officer was also injured by gunfire during the incident.
2025-03-19	Christopher Lepe (19)	White	Aurora, Illinois	Lepe, a man who dragged and seriously injured a Geneva officer with his car, was being sought by police. APD officers later located him, he fled, which led to a pursuit. After the chase, he exited the car with a gun before being fatally shot.
2025-03-19	Pierce William Cole (22)	Unknown	Pell City, Alabama	Police responded to calls of a man damaging vehicles with a hatchet. A responding officer fatally shot Cole after he allegedly charged at the officer with the hatchet.
2025-03-19	Urban Andrew Seay (36)	White	Seattle, Washington	Seattle PD found a man armed with a knife in police precinct parking lot. The man approached several officers with a knife. After non-lethal weapons failed, they fatally shot him.
2025-03-19	Samuel Mumyarutete (48)	Black	Lockland, Ohio	West Chester Police attempted to stop a stolen vehicle, but the driver fled, leading to a multi-county pursuit. One suspect was taken into custody at some point. Police located another man, Mumyarutete, walking alongside the highway, though it is not known if he was related to the stolen vehicle. Mumyarutete was from the Democratic Republic of the Congo and did not speak English. Police tased Mumyarutete when he refused to follow commands, before an officer shot him. There was no body camera footage of the shooting, though part of it was captured by a highway camera.
2025-03-19	Sawyer Felton Frye (37)	White	Pinehurst, North Carolina	While investigating a house fire, a man exited the home and grabbed an axe left by a firefighter. Police shot the man after he allegedly charged at them with the axe and a taser failed to work.
2025-03-18	Keith Truesdell (49)	White	Vanceburg, Kentucky	Lewis County deputies responded to a call of a man shooting a gun. Upon arrival, Truesdell shot a deputy before being killed by returned fire.
2025-03-18	Billy Joe Soto (34)	Hispanic	Pueblo, Colorado	Police received a call that an officer had been shot. Additional officers arrived and a shoot-out occurred between them and the suspect. Two additional officers were injured, and Soto, a former local MS-13 gang member born on January 4, 1991, was killed by other officers. PPD released the footage.
2025-03-17	Jimmy Lee Rupe (40)	White	Modesto, California	Rupe, a man wanted on multiple felony arrest warrants, was shot dead during a shootout with police officers. More than 100 shots were fired.
2025-03-17	Jedidiah S. Skinner (30)	White	Kuttawa, Kentucky	A person called emergency services, saying that a man had approached his vehicle, pulled out a gun, and fired the weapon once. An officer arrived to the scene and shot and killed Skinner in unclear circumstances.
2025-03-16	Brett George (34)	Unknown	Knik-Fairview, Alaska	George allegedly threatened two family members with a firearm before fleeing and engaging in a police pursuit. He reportedly stopped his car and began firing a rifle at an officer, who returned fire and killed him.
2025-03-16	Miguel Morin (43)	Hispanic	San Antonio, Texas	A SAPD officer attempted to stop a driver, but he fled on foot. During the foot chase, he produced a knife and the officer shot him dead after the taser failed. The knife was recovered at the scene and a gun was found in the vehicle.
2025-03-16	Shawn Antonio Ware (48)	Hispanic	Ravenna, Ohio	RPD officers responded to a report and found a man lying on the floor with a firearm in his waistband. Officers ordered him to drop the gun but he closed the door. He later exited the apartment, holding another man as a human shield and pointed the gun at police, prompting them to fatally shoot him. RPD later confirmed the gun he was holding is a BB gun.
2025-03-16	Christopher Lucrisia (39)	Hispanic	Mountain View, Hawaii	Lucrisia, a subject of a manhunt in the attempted murder of a police officer in Hilo, was shot dead in a shootout with Hawaii Police Department officers in Mountain View.
2025-03-16	Patrick Martinez (39)	Hispanic	Crofton, Kentucky	Martinez allegedly shot at police officers responding to a domestic violence situation. Officers fatally shot Martinez.
2025-03-15	Jose Francisco Escobar Vasquez	Hispanic	North Amityville, New York	An off-duty Metropolitan Transportation Authority officer struck and killed a pedestrian.
2025-03-15	Ruben Ray Martinez (23)	Hispanic	South Padre Island, Texas	In February 2026, Newsweek first reported that Martinez’s death marked the first fatal shooting involving federal officers since Donald Trump’s second term began. A Homeland Security Investigations team conducting an immigration enforcement operation in conjunction with local police had surrounded the vehicle Martinez was driving. Martinez reportedly intentionally rammed an HSI agent before other agents opened fire. The details were not disclosed until February 20, 2026. Federal and state authorities did not respond to questions about why they had not issued a media release until 11 months later.
2025-03-15	Michelle Salmeron (23)	Hispanic	Miami, Florida	A Miami Police officer who was traveling through an intersection hit another car while the car was making a left turn. Police stated that the impact left pedestrian Salmeron dead and another woman injured.
2025-03-15	James Combs (42)	White	Prunedale, California	Combs crashed his vehicle along U.S. Route 101, causing a California Highway Patrol officer to respond to the scene. He shot and killed Combs after Combs approached him with a knife and did not follow commands.
2025-03-15	Jayden Michael Arthurs (19)	White	Huntington, West Virginia	Arthurs drove off when an officer attempted to pull him over for reckless driving and speeding. The chase ended in the Guyandotte neighborhood when Arthurs drove through a residential backyard. He attempted to reverse toward on-foot officers and K-9, prompting officers to open fire and kill him. The footage was released.
2025-03-15	Geoffroy Raphael Gournet (65)	White	Wind Gap, Pennsylvania	Several departments were chasing a man in a vehicle after responding to reports of a suicidal subject. After the pursuit, an officer shot and killed the armed man during a scuffle. Police said the man also shot himself.
2025-03-15	Pedro Garcia (19)	Hispanic	Fullerton, California	A man called police to report Garcia, his brother, was attacking his father with a knife. A family member took the knife from Garcia. Police responded and fatally shot Garcia when he reportedly refused to listen to commands and pulled out a gun. The weapon was later determined to be a pellet gun.
2025-03-14	Danielle Moore (36)	White	Helena, Montana	Police responded to reports of a woman making threats with a pistol outside of a courthouse. Officers arrived and fatally shot Moore after a confrontation.
2025-03-14	Mario Sanchez (35)	Hispanic	Los Angeles, California	LAPD officers pulled over a car after witnessing it driving erratically. The driver, Sanchez, then began yelling profanity at officers and pulled out a cellphone from his waistband and pointed it at officers. Officers then shot and killed him.
2025-03-13	Michael Ardizone (38)	White	Tylertown, Mississippi	Pike County deputies were chasing a vehicle which fled a traffic stop. During the pursuit, a police car collided with the fleeing vehicle, one of the passengers inside was killed.
2025-03-13	Freddie Ware (43)	Black	McKinney, Texas	Officers responded to a shooting at a Red Roof Inn and found a woman in her 50s with a gunshot wound; she was transported to hospital in stable condition. The suspect in the shooting, Ware, barricaded himself in a motel room and allegedly threatened to "shoot everyone." After a half-hour standoff, he exited the room and reportedly brandished a gun as a K-9 was deployed to apprehend him. During the resulting exchange of gunfire, Ware and the K-9 were fatally shot.
2025-03-13	unidentified male	Unknown	Rye, Arizona	Gila County Sheriff’s Office responded to a call about someone taking equipment from a business. When they attempted to contact the pickup driver who was loading and towing UTVs, he reportedly refused to comply and a deputy fatally shot him under unknown circumstances. Another two suspects who were involved in the incident are still on the run.
2025-03-12	unidentified male	Unknown	Evanston, Wyoming	US Marshals Fugitive Task Force and Uinta County Sheriff's Office shot and killed a man wanted on felony warrants.
2025-03-12	Nathan Hoang (41)	Asian	Hayward, California	Hoang died nine days after being subdued by Hayward police—involved in a burglary incident—tased, handcuffed, and later restrained on a gurney by paramedics who administered midazolam. Authorities cited a heart attack, methamphetamine toxicity, and physical exertion as the cause. The footage was released.
2025-03-12	unidentified male	Unknown	Elbert County, Colorado	According to police report, Elbert County deputies responded to a domestic dispute and encountered a suspect who was armed with a gun in a fifth wheel trailer. The suspect fired at the deputies after they used pepper balls and other less-lethal devices on him. They returned fire, killing the suspect.
2025-03-12	Brandon Timothy White (33)	Black	Jacksonville, Florida	As an officer pulled a man over for a traffic stop, the man pulled into a driveway and began shooting at the officer. The officer returned fire and killed the suspect as he attempted to exit the vehicle with a rifle. The man was wearing a bulletproof vest and possessed two firearms. The footage was released.
2025-03-11	Jermaine Terrell Jackson Jr. (21)	Unknown	Cadiz, Kentucky	Jackson reportedly failed to pull over for a traffic stop and crashed his car near a Red Roof Inn. After a foot chase, an exchange of gunfire between Jackson and police allegedly occurred in which a sheriff's deputy was wounded and Jackson killed.
2025-03-10	Gracy Gomez Andres (4)	Unknown	Austin, Texas	An APD patrol car which was responding to a shooting incident struck a civilian vehicle that was pulling out from a private driveway. Andres was injured and later died at a hospital on March 14.
2025-03-10	Kenny Beno (41)	White	Warren, Michigan	A woman called police to report her boyfriend, Beno, had showed up outside her home with a knife. Police found Beno walking near some nearby train tracks and shot him after a taser failed to work. Police said Beno was holding an ice pick.
2025-03-09	Jacob Tyler Sobieraj (24)	Unknown	Lancaster, South Carolina	Sobieraj called police to report he killed a woman and her six-year-old son. Deputies arrived and killed Sobieraj in a shoot-out.
2025-03-08	Anthony Virginia (41)	White	Milwaukee, Wisconsin	Police responded to two suspects with guns conducting a robbery on Milwaukee's North Side. They approached Virginia, who police say was armed, and shot him in unclear circumstances. The second suspect, a 34-year-old man, was arrested.
2025-03-07	David Allen Dunford (54)	White	Guthrie, Oklahoma	Guthrie Police responded to a call about a man, Dunford, who threatened to self-harm and suicide by cop. When officers arrived, Dunford told them he was armed with a gun and they tried to remove him from the vehicle. During which, he put the vehicle in reverse, striking an officer with the car door, prompting the officers to shoot and kill him. A shotgun and a handgun was found. The officers involved were cleared. The footage had been released.
2025-03-07	Julie Knehans (53)	White	Jefferson City, Missouri	Police officers shot and killed an armed suspect who was involved in a burglary incident.
2025-03-07	Joseph Santos (42)	Black	Scottsdale, Arizona	Santos fled from the police twice after police responded to a report of someone threatening another person with a gun. When they blocked him with patrol vehicles, he did not follow commands. Santos then reached for something in the back seat of the vehicle and a K9 was deployed, an officer shot at the K9 and Santos. Santos died and K9 Rocco was injured. The footage was released.
2025-03-07	Reggie Knight (28)	White	Charlotte, North Carolina	CMPD officers and SWAT team were serving a warrant on Knight. During the encounter, Knight shot two police officers before being killed in the shootout.
2025-03-07	Melanie Udell (53)	Unknown	Bismarck, North Dakota	Bismarck Police responded to a report of a woman who appeared to be high in her vehicle, later identified as Udell. When officers attempted to stop her, she began swerving her SUV in the parking lot, eventually striking one of the officers. Officers shot and killed her.
2025-03-07	Robert Tate (40)	Unknown	Lexington, Tennessee	Officers responded to a domestic incident and found Tate following a female subject. A shootout occurred between him and officers, which left Tate dead and an officer injured.
2025-03-06	Joseph Blair (41)	White	Twin Groves, Arkansas	Blair, an absconder, was located by US Marshals, Arkansas Department of Corrections officers, and County Police. During the encounter, police said he was armed with a gun and was fatally shot by DOC.
2025-03-06	Brian Padilla (36)	White	Albuquerque, New Mexico	County Police responded to a call about a person, Padilla, arming themselves. Police fatally shot Padilla.
2025-03-06	David Plagmann (36)	White	Harlan, Iowa	Plagmann was armed during a standoff with Shelby County deputies. According to a press release, Plagmann "made an aggressive move towards law enforcement" before deputies shot him. Police later found a woman dead inside the residence, who police believe was killed by Plagmann.
2025-03-06	Gregory Dylan Sheppard (43)	White	Frisco, Texas	Police fatally shot Sheppard while serving a warrant in a gated community. Few details were released
2025-03-06	Christine Lewis (36)	Unknown	Lawson, Colorado	Clear Creek deputies attempted to stop Lewis in a vehicle for a felony arrest warrant in Oklahoma. She fled the traffic stop and crashed her vehicle. She reportedly exited the vehicle with a gun after less-lethal devices were used on her. Deputies shot and killed her after she pointed the gun at them. A picture of Lewis pointing a handgun at deputies was shown in the final report by CBI. Both of them were cleared in this fatal shooting.
2025-03-06	William Bowen (21)	Black	Hartford, Connecticut	Officers approached Bowen, who had live-streamed himself holding a gun on Instagram. Three officers shot Bowen as he emerged from an alleyway. He later died at a hospital. According to a preliminary report, police recovered two guns along the path Bowen had fled, though they did not find a gun on his person after he was shot. The footage had been released by inspector general.
2025-03-06	Disnime Mitchell (23)	Black	Charleston, West Virginia	Mitchell was wanted on first-degree robbery charges. He was confronted by SWAT team members outside a Dollar General store, where he reportedly pulled out a gun and pointed it at them. A SWAT officer fired one shot, killing him.
2025-03-06	unidentified male	Unknown	Phoenix, Arizona	DEA agents and Glendale Police officers were involved in a shooting at an apartment complex which left a suspect dead.
2025-03-06	Wyleek Tinsley (19)	Black	Glenside, Pennsylvania	Police responded to reports Tinsley had fired a gun at his girlfriend. Officers entered the apartment after hearing a gunshot and shot Tinsley in a hallway. Tinsley was holding a cellphone when he was shot. His gun was found in a bedroom.
2025-03-06	Winston Johnson (55)	Black	New York City, New York	Police responded to a man with a gun in a Home Depot parking lot in Tottenville, Staten Island. Johnson fired multiple shots as police arrived and pointed the gun at officers, causing them to shoot him dead. A Smith & Wesson revolver was recovered.
2025-03-05	Patrick Sargent (25)	White	Boylston, Massachusetts	Police responded to reports of an armed and dangerous man in the neighborhood. Boylston PD, Rutland PD K-9 unit arrived before a standoff ensued. Sargent barricaded himself in a bedroom while armed. A Rutland police officer later shot him. The footage was released.
2025-03-04	Mercedes Smith (28)	Black	Glenview, Illinois	Smith was struck by a Cook County Sheriff's Office squad car in unclear circumstances and died in the hospital the following day.
2025-03-04	Jesus Corona Uribe (39)	Hispanic	Mammoth Lakes, California	Officers responded to reports of a man throwing rocks at passing cars. They encountered the individual at the entrance of the library and shot him dead after he reportedly ran toward them while he was armed with rocks.
2025-03-04	Tyler Layton (28)	White	Clinton, Oklahoma	OHP troopers located a homicide suspect, Layton, and initiated a traffic stop. Officials stated that Layton was armed when he was fatally shot by troopers.
2025-03-04	Isaiah Fourshey (28)	Pacific Islander	Volcano, Hawaii	Fourshey, a murder suspect, was involved in a confrontation with Hawaii Police Department officers at a campground within Hawai'i Volcanoes National Park which led to officers shooting and killing Fourshey. HVNP bodycam footage of officer involved shooting. on YouTube
2025-03-04	Homero Rosales Corona (42)	Hispanic	Bakersfield, California	Kern County deputies were serving an emergency protective order. Rosales Corona flagged down the deputies after the protective order was granted. He picked up a shotgun and raised it at them before he was shot. The footage was released.
2025-03-04	Jody Tollet (42)	White	Crossville, Tennessee	Tollet, a domestic violence suspect, led police on a pursuit and crashed his vehicle. He allegedly shot at an officer as he advanced towards police, causing police to shoot him dead.
2025-03-04	Timothy L. Johnston (39)	Unknown	Jefferson County, Missouri	Police responded to a home north of Hillsboro for reports of a man banging on a door. Johnston made suicidal statements and placed a handgun to his head. Officers shot and killed him after he allegedly fired on them following negotiations.
2025-03-03	unidentified	Unknown	Moenkopi, Arizona	A person was shot and killed by agents of the Federal Bureau of Investigation on the Hopi Reservation.
2025-03-02	Michael Oxley (43)	White	Chico, California	Oxley, suspected in the shooting of a barber on February 28, engaged in a standoff with police at a parking garage. He was shot and killed by officers after he fired a gun at them in a standoff. Chico Police released the footage.
2025-03-02	Daniele McDowell (39)	Black	Hiram, Georgia	Police were responding to an aggravated assault where the suspect was stabbing a man. Police attempted to use less lethal force on the suspect but failed, prompting them to fatally shoot the suspect after the suspect kept approaching them with a knife.
2025-03-01	Jhoser Sanchez (20)	Hispanic	Richland, Washington	An off-duty Washington State Patrol officer struck and killed a motorcyclist, Sanchez, with her vehicle. The officer was charged with vehicular homicide while driving under the influence. The bodycam footage of the arrest of the officer was released.
2025-03-01	Messiah Nantwi (22)	Black	Marcy, New York	Prison guards at the Marcy Correctional Facility beat Nantwi to death. Nantwi's death happened about a week after six guards at the same facility were indicted for beating another prisoner to death. Eleven employees were placed on administrative leave.
2025-03-01	Lemark Jaramillo (32)	Hispanic	Boston, Massachusetts	An off-duty police officer shot and killed a man at a Chick-fil-A restaurant after he allegedly ran at two other people with a knife.
2025-03-01	Nick Raymond Bingham (62)	White	Orlando, Florida	Police responded to a man beating on a person's door with a gun. They encountered a man armed with an AR-15 rifle and shot him dead when he refused to listen to commands. Orlando Police released the footage.
2025-03-01	unidentified male	Unknown	Concho, Arizona	Apache County deputies attempted to pull over the suspect, but he fled, leading them on a pursuit. Deputies later found the vehicle engulfed in flames and heard gunshots. The suspect reportedly pointed a 9mm pistol at them before deputies shot him.

== See also ==
- Death in custody § United States
- Henry A. Wallace Police Crime Public Database
- List of cases of police brutality
- List of countries with annual rates and counts for killings by law enforcement officers
- List of law enforcement officers killed in the line of duty in the United States
- List of law enforcement officers convicted for an on-duty killing in the United States
- List of shootings by US immigration agents
- List of police reforms related to the George Floyd protests
- List of unarmed African Americans killed by law enforcement officers in the United States
- Lists of killings by law enforcement officers
- Police brutality in the United States
- Police misconduct § United States
- Police riot § United States
- Police use of deadly force in the United States
