= Attorney-General's Department =

Attorney-General's Department may refer to:

- State of Hawaii Department of the Attorney General
- Attorney General's Department (Sri Lanka)
- Attorney-General's Department (Australia)
  - Attorney-General's Department (South Australia)
