= State of Hawaii Department of the Attorney General =

Hawaii attorney general department

State of Hawaii, Department of the Attorney General
- Seal of Hawaii

Agency overview
- Jurisdiction: State of Hawaii
- Headquarters: 425 Queen Street, Honolulu, Hawaii, United States
- Agency executive: Anne E. Lopez, Attorney General of Hawaii
- Website: ag.hawaii.gov

The Attorney General of Hawaii, the chief legal officer and chief law enforcement officer of Hawaii, is responsible for the Department of the Attorney General which is charged with advising the various other departments and agencies of the state government and for the prosecution of offenses under state law.

== Divisions ==
The Department of the Attorney General is divided into multiple divisions:

=== Legal services ===
- Administration Division — principally responsible for commercial and financial-related legal issues.
- Appellate Division — oversight authority over all state and federal appeals in the department. The division also serves as the primary contact point with other states for filing amicus briefs in the United States Supreme Court and other courts in pending non-Hawaii cases that may affect Hawaii.
- Civil Recoveries Division — pursues monies owed to the State.
- Civil Rights Litigation Division — provides legal defense to the State, its departments and agencies, and certain state employees in lawsuits or other claims that involve allegations of constitutional or civil rights violations.
- Commerce and Economic Development Division — provides legal services and litigation support to the Department of Commerce and Consumer Affairs, the Department of Business, Economic Development, and Tourism, and the Department of Agriculture.
- Criminal Justice Division — performs prosecutorial functions on behalf of the State in areas such as welfare fraud, tax fraud, unemployment fraud, unauthorized practice of law, public corruption, internet crimes against children, high technology crimes, Medicaid fraud and elder abuse, violations of state tobacco laws, drug nuisance, environmental crimes, cold homicide cases, and conflict cases from the four county prosecutors’ office.
- Education Division — principally provides legal advice and support to the Department of Education and the Board of Education.
- Employment Law Division — provides legal representation and advice to the Department of Human Resources Development and to all state departments and agencies on employment-related issues.
- Family Law Division — handles all state litigation under the jurisdiction of Family Court, such as child and adult protection, guardianships, truancy, adolescent mental health cases, and involuntary civil mental commitment hearings.
- Health and Human Services Division — provides the principal legal services and support to the Department of Health and the Department of Human Services and also enforces the State’s environmental laws.
- Labor Division — provides legal services and litigation support to the Department of Labor and Industrial Relations and boards and agencies administratively attached to that department.
- Land/Transportation Division — provides legal services to both the Department of Land and Natural Resources and the Department of Transportation.
- Legislative Division — provides legal services on matters pertaining to legislation and to proposed administrative rules.
- Public Safety, Hawaiian Home Lands, and Housing Division — provides legal services and support to the Department of Public Safety, the Department of Hawaiian Home Lands, the Hawaii Housing Finance and Development Corporation, and the Hawaii Public Housing Authority.
- Tax & Charities Division — provides legal representation and advice to the Department of Taxation and other state departments and agencies, primarily in the areas of tax litigation, legislation, rules, investigations, and opinions and advice.
- Tort Litigation Division — provides legal defense to personal injury lawsuits and claims made against the State and its departments and agencies.

=== Public services ===
- Child Support Enforcement Agency — provides assistance to children by locating parents, establishing paternity and support obligations (both financial and medical), and enforcing those obligations.
- Crime Prevention and Justice Assistance Division — coordinates statewide programs, activities, research, and grants for the improvement of the criminal justice system, crime victim services, and community crime prevention efforts.
- Hawaii Criminal Justice Data Center — responsible for the statewide criminal history record information system, the statewide Automated Fingerprint Identification System, the statewide SexOffender and Other Covered Offender Registry, and the Adult Criminal Conviction Information Web Site.
- Office of Child Support Hearings — provides a fair and impartial administrative forum for the expeditious resolution of child support disputes.

=== Other ===
- Administrative Services Division — provides professional, effective and efficient support services for all employees, colleagues and clients of the department.
- Investigations Division — conducts investigations in support of the department’s civil, criminal, and administrative cases.
- Special Investigation and Prosecution Division — combats human trafficking, corruption, fraud and economic crimes in Hawaii.

== Investigations ==
=== Investigations Division ===
The Investigations Division conducts investigations in support of the department’s civil, criminal, and administrative cases. These investigations involve such areas as homeland security; tactical intelligence operations; fugitive warrant investigations and extraditions, counter terrorism operations, organized crime and special career criminal suppression; crimes against children; fraud investigations, computer crimes; drug nuisance abatement; environmental crimes; tobacco tax enforcement; Internal Affairs investigations, crimes committed at state airport, harbors, and highways; cold homicide cases; and other criminal and civil matters.

As of June 30, 2023, the Investigations Division had the following structure:

- Chief Special Investigator
  - Secretary III — Clerical Services Section
    - Two (2) Office Assistant IV's
  - Investigator VI — Tobacco Tax Section
    - Five (5) Investigator V's
  - Investigator VI — Investigative Services Section
    - Thirty six (36) Investigator V's

On January 1, 2024, certain "law enforcement personnel of the Investigations Division of the Department of the Attorney General" were transferred to the new Hawaii Department of Law Enforcement pursuant to Hawaii Bill HB2171 and SB1337. Per SB1337, one Chief Investigator, nineteen (19) Investigators, and one administrative secretary were transferred from the Investigations Division to the Department of Law Enforcement.

=== Other criminal investigations units ===
==== Department of the Attorney General ====
In addition to the Investigations Division, several other divisions of the Department of the Attorney General also house independent investigative functions.

- The Medicaid Fraud Control Unit, operating under the Criminal Justice Division, is a federally and state funded unit that is charged with conducting criminal and civil investigations and prosecutions of provider fraud against the Medicaid Program, fraud in the administration of the Medicaid Program, and abuse and neglect of Medicaid beneficiaries and residents of board and care facilities. The Investigations Unit of the Medicaid Fraud Control Unit is headed by an Investigator VI and it is staffed by six (6) Investigator V's.
- The Internet Crimes Against Children Unit, operating under the Criminal Justice Division, is focused on the prevention, interdiction, investigation and prosecution of individuals who use the internet to exploit children. The unit also seek to combat crimes against children through the internet by the vigorous investigation and prosecution of offenders. The Hawaii Internet Crimes Against Children Unit is part of a nationwide group of 61 regional task forces spread throughout the United States and funded by the United States Department of Justice, Office of Juvenile Justice and Delinquency Prevention. The unit is headed by an Investigator VI, and it is staffed by five (5) Investigator V's, one (1) Information Technology Specialist V, and one (1) Office Assistant IV.
- The Investigation and Analysis Unit, operating under the Special Investigation and Prosecution Division, combats human trafficking, corruption, fraud and economic crimes in Hawaii. The unit is headed by a Lead Forensic Analyst and it is staffed by two (2) Forensic Analysts and seven (7) Investigator V's.

In addition to the larger investigative functions outlined above, the Department of the Attorney General has investigators working in various smaller functions as well which include:

- Child Support Enforcement Agency: two (2) Investigator IV's, seven (7) Investigator III's.
- Tax & Charities Division: one (1) Investigator V.

==== County Prosecutor's Office, Criminal Investigation Units ====
The County Prosecutor's Office, Criminal Investigation Units (Hawaii County, Kauai County, Honolulu City and County, and Maui County) come under the authority and are subordinate to the Hawaii Department of the Attorney General and work closely with and perform investigations for the Attorney General. County Prosecutor Investigators also have the powers and privileges of police officers with state wide jurisdiction to effect arrest and conduct investigations.

- Hawaii Prosecuting Attorney Office, Criminal Investigations Unit - Hawai‘i
- Kauai Prosecuting Attorney Office, Criminal Investigations Unit - Kaua‘i, Ni‘ihau
- Maui Prosecuting Attorney Office, Investigative Services Division - Maui, Moloka‘i, Lāna‘ī
- City and County of Honolulu Prosecuting Attorney Office, Criminal Investigations Unit - Oahu

=== Rank structure ===
Investigators have the powers and privileges of police officers with statewide jurisdiction to effect arrest and conduct investigations. Most investigators are experienced law enforcement officer with other federal, state or local police agencies prior to being employed with the division. Investigators conduct investigations of the most complex, confidential, and diverse civil/criminal cases being considered and/or readied for court action and prosecution; obtains additional information, evidence, and facts to clarify or substantiate findings of law enforcement agencies; secures, interviews, and interrogates witnesses complainants, and suspects; conducts highly confidential investigations.

- Chief Special Investigator, EM-07: responsible for planning, administering, organizing, and directing the statewide investigations program. As chief of the Investigations Division of the Department of the Attorney General, the sole position in this class is responsible for developing program plans to achieve program goals and objectives; developing operational policies and procedures; developing and implementing the program's budget; recommending new laws, rules and regulations; testifying before the Legislature; and establishing and maintaining extensive public contacts with representatives of other international, State, federal, and county agencies to share information and collaborate on law enforcement projects and activities.
- Chief Investigator, EM-05: Plans, organizes and directs a program for the conduct of confidential investigations for the Attorney General’s office dealing with crime, subversive activities and public employees and officers; and performs other related duties as assigned.
- Investigator VI, SR-26 (Colonel) : plans, organizes, directs and coordinates a statewide investigative program, and performs other related duties as assigned. At this level, positions develop operating policies and procedures; resolve operational problems; recommend new laws, rules and regulations or recommend revisions; testify before the legislature; prepare budget requests and develop training programs. Work activities and requirements are broad and complex although violations investigated are related to specific program areas, such as, welfare fraud, controlled substances, regulated industries, consumer protection, etc. Investigators at the VI level may occasionally work on the most complex investigations, which involve highly controversial issues and extremely complex problems.
- Investigator V, SR-24: plans, organizes, directs and coordinates the activities of an investigative agency concerned with civil, administrative and/or criminal investigations falling within its respective jurisdiction, and performs other related duties as assigned.
  - Type A (Commander): a full supervisor who has complete technical and administrative responsibility for an agency's investigative program (e.g. welfare fraud) and has supervisory responsibility over a staff of investigators, where at least one member of the staff is of the Investigator IV level, type A or C.
  - Type B (Captain): an investigator who conducts civil, administrative and criminal investigations falling within a variety of jurisdictions, such as, the Executive, Legislative or Judicial Branches, State departments or agencies, county and federal governments and regulatory boards and commissions, where violations or circumstances investigated are related to a broad variety of program areas and covering a very broad range of laws, rules and regulations.
- Investigator IV, SR-22 (Lieutenant): performs and/or supervises investigations involving suspected or actual violations of civil, administrative and/or criminal laws, rules, regulations or other legal requirements within an agency's jurisdiction; determines case approach and gathers supporting evidence or information; and performs other related duties as assigned.
  - Type A: an investigator independently performing the full range of investigations within an agency's jurisdiction where the work regularly is of a complex nature, but is limited to investigating violations that are related to a specific program area, such as, welfare fraud, controlled substances, regulated industries, consumer protection, etc.
  - Type B: one or two investigators who are responsible for the small investigative program in an agency, without higher level investigative supervisory guidance. These investigators are responsible for the day-to-day operations of their respective investigative program areas, including the promotion of public understanding and cooperation; recommendation of changes to laws, rules, regulations, policies and procedures; conduct of education and training activities; establishing and maintaining effective working relationships with law enforcement and other agencies, as well as, maintaining records, preparing reports and performing other administrative duties.
  - Type C: the working supervisory investigator in an agency where investigations are carried out according to standard policies and procedures, from planning through fact-finding to reporting the results of investigations.
- Investigator III, SR-20 (Sergeant) : conducts investigations pertaining to an agency's investigative program; prevents and/or detects violations of laws, rules and regulations within an agency's jurisdiction; investigates complaints filed by the public or others; develops and secures information or evidence; prepares reports; and performs other related duties as assigned.
- Investigator II, SR-18 (Officer II): performs a limited range of investigative activities in the prevention and detection of violations of laws, rules and regulations falling within an agency's jurisdiction; gathers information; prepares reports; and performs other related duties as assigned.
- Investigator I, SR-16 (Officer): receives orientation and training in the investigative field; learns basic investigative techniques and procedures, as well as laws, rules and regulations pertaining to an agency's jurisdiction; receives simple and routine assignments; and performs other related duties as assigned. As the entry trainee level in the series, positions in this class receive formal and on-the-job training in investigative methods, techniques, procedures and laws, rules and regulations pertinent to an agency's jurisdiction. Initially, the investigator is primarily an observer in working with higher level investigators, but as experience is gained, selected investigative duties are assigned.

== See also ==
- List of law enforcement agencies in Hawaii
- Government of Hawaii
