= List of law enforcement agencies in South Dakota =

This is a list of law enforcement agencies in the state of South Dakota.

According to the US Bureau of Justice Statistics' 2008 Census of State and Local Law Enforcement Agencies, the state had 155 law enforcement agencies employing 1,636 sworn police officers, about 203 for each 100,000 residents.

== State agencies ==
- South Dakota Division of Criminal Investigation
- South Dakota Department of Corrections
- South Dakota Department of Public Safety
  - South Dakota Department of Public Safety Safety & Enforcement
  - South Dakota Highway Patrol
- South Dakota Office of Highway Safety
  - South Dakota Department of Homeland Security
- South Dakota Game, Fish, & Parks Conservation Officers
- South Dakota Commission on Gaming
  - South Dakota Motor Carrier
- The Huron Police Department is the South Dakota's State Fair Police Department.

== Federal Agencies within South Dakota ==
- Bureau of Alcohol, Tobacco, Firearms and Explosives Field Divisions
  - Bureau of Alcohol, Tobacco, Firearms and Explosives St. Paul Field Division/South Dakota Field Offices
- Bureau of Indian Affairs
- Bureau of Indian Affairs Regional Offices
  - Bureau of Indian Affairs Office of Justice Services
  - Bureau of Indian Affairs Office of Justice Services Districts
  - Bureau of Indian Affairs Office of Justice Services Drug Division Enforcement
- Drug Enforcement Administration
- Drug Enforcement Administration Field Offices
- Federal Bureau of Investigation
- National Park Service
- United States Marshal's Service

== County agencies ==
- Aurora County Sheriff's Office
- Beadle County Sheriff's Office
- Bennett County Sheriff's Office
- Bon Homme County Sheriff's Office
- Brookings County Sheriff's Office
- Brown County Sheriff's Office
- Brule County Sheriff's Office
- Buffalo County Sheriff's Office
- Butte County Sheriff's Office
- Campbell County Sheriff's Office
- Charles Mix County Sheriff's Office
- Clark County Sheriff's Office
- Clay County Sheriff's Office
- Codington County Sheriff's Office
- Corson County Sheriff's Office
- Custer County Sheriff's Office
- Davison County Sheriff's Office
- Day County Sheriff's Office
- Deuel County Sheriff's Office
- Dewey County Sheriff's Office
- Douglas County Sheriff's Office
- Edmunds County Sheriff's Office
- Fall River County Sheriff's Office
- Faulk County Sheriff's Office
- Grant County Sheriff's Office
- Gregory County Sheriff's Office
- Haakon County Sheriff's Office
- Hamlin County Sheriff's Office
- Hand County Sheriff's Office
- Hanson County Sheriff's Office
- Harding County Sheriff's Office
- Hughes County Sheriff's Office
- Hutchinson County Sheriff's Office
- Hyde County Sheriff's Office
- Jackson County Sheriff's Office
- Jerauld County Sheriff's Office
- Jones County Sheriff's Office
- Kingsbury County Sheriff's Office
- Lake County Sheriff's Office
- Lawrence County Sheriff's Office
- Lincoln County Sheriff's Office
- Lyman County Sheriff's Office
- Marshall County Sheriff's Office
- McCook County Sheriff's Office
- McPherson County Sheriff's Office
- Meade County Sheriff's Office
- Mellette County Sheriff's Office
- Miner County Sheriff's Office
- Minnehaha County Sheriff's Office
- Moody County Sheriff's Office
- Pennington County Sheriff's Office
- Perkins County Sheriff's Office
- Potter County Sheriff's Office
- Roberts County Sheriff's Office
- Sanborn County Sheriff's Office
- Oglala County Sheriff's Office -formerly known as Shannon County in 2015
- Spink County Sheriff's Office
- Stanley County Sheriff's Office
- Sully County Sheriff's Office
- Todd County Sheriff's Office
- Tripp County Sheriff's Office
- Turner County Sheriff's Office
- Union County Sheriff's Office
- Walworth County Sheriff's Office
- Yankton County Sheriff's Office
- Ziebach County Sheriff's Office

== City agencies ==
- Aberdeen Police Department
- Alcester Police Department
- Avon Police Department
- Belle Fourche Police Department
- Beresford Police Department
- Box Elder Police Department
- Brandon Police Department
- Brookings Police Department
- Burke Police Department
- Canton Police Department
- Centerville Police Department
- Chamberlain Police Department
- Clark Police Department
- Deadwood Police Department
- Elk Point Police Department
- Freeman Police Department
- Faith Police Department
- Flandreau Police Department
- Gettysburg Police Department
- Gregory Police Department
- Groton Police Department
- Hot Springs Police Department
- Huron Police Department
- Kimball Police Department
- Lead Police Department
- Lennox Police Department
- Madison Police Department
- Martin Police Department
- Menno Police Department
- Milbank Police Department
- Miller Police Department
- Mission Police Department
- Mitchell Police Department
- Mobridge Police Department
- Murdo Police Department
- North Sioux City Police Department
- Parkston Police Department
- Philip Police Department
- Pierre Police Department
- Platte Police Department
- Rapid City Police Department
- Scotland Police Department
- Sioux Falls Police Department
- Sisseton Police Department
- Spearfish Police Department
- Springfield Police Department
- Sturgis Police Department
- Summerset Police Department
- Tea Police Department
- Vermillion Police Department
- Viborg Police Department
- Wagner Police Department
- Watertown Police Department
- Webster Police Department
- White Wood Police Department
- Winner Police Department
- Yankton Police Department

== College and university agencies ==
- South Dakota School of Mines Police Department
- South Dakota State University Police Department
- University of South Dakota Police Department

== Disbanded agencies ==
- Burke Police Department
- Canistota Police Department
- Colman Police Department
- Corsica Police Department
- Dell Rapids Police Department
- Delmont Police Department
- Dupree Police Department
- Edgemont Police Department
- Estelline Police Department
- Fort Pierre Police Department
- Harrisburg Police Department
- Hurley Police Department
- Irene Police Department
- Jefferson Police Department
- Kadoka Police Department
- Keystone Police Department
- Lake Andes Police Department
- Leola Police Department
- Lemmon Police Department
- Marion Police Department
- McLaughlin Police Department
- Miller Police Department
- Parker Police Department
- Rosholt Police Department
- Roslyn Police Department
- Scotland Police Department
- Selby Police Department
- Tyndall Police Department
- Wall Police Department

== Tribal agencies - BIA ==
- Cheyenne River Police Department
- Crow Creek Police Department
- Flandreau Santee Sioux Police Department
- Lower Brule Police Department
- Oglala Lakota Police Department
- Rosebud Police Department
- Sisseton- Wahpeton Oyate Police Department
- Yankton Sioux Police Department
