= State bureau of narcotics =

In the United States, state bureaus of narcotics are bureau of law enforcement at U.S. state level, counterparts to the national Drug Enforcement Administration. Some states have a state bureau of narcotics but some do not. Some states let state police have state narcotics units or divisions to enforce drug laws on the state level.

== List of state bureaus ==
- Narcotics Enforcement Division, Hawaii
- Mississippi Bureau of Narcotics
- Oklahoma Bureau of Narcotics and Dangerous Drugs Control
- California Bureau of Narcotic Enforcement (disbanded in 2012)
- New York State Bureau of Narcotic Enforcement
- Iowa Division of Narcotics Enforcement
- Kentucky East/West Drug Enforcement
- Maine Drug Enforcement Agency
