= Hawaiʻi Prosecuting Attorney Office, Criminal Investigations Unit =

American law enforcement agency

County of Hawaiʻi, Office of the Prosecuting Attorney Office, Criminal Investigations Unit
- Motto: Justice with Integrity and Commitment

Jurisdictional structure
- Operations jurisdiction: County of Hawaiʻi, USA
- Area: 5,000 sq.mi.
- Population: 225,000
- Legal jurisdiction: State of Hawaii, County of Hawaiʻi
- Governing body: Hawaii Legislature
- General nature: Civilian police

Operational structure
- Headquarters: Hilo, Hawaii
- Criminal Investigators: >100
- Agency executives: Kelden B.A. Waltjen, Prosecuting Attorney; Stephen L. Frye, First Deputy Prosecuting Attorney; (Vacant), Chief Investigator
- Parent agency: State of Hawaiʻi, Attorney General's Office
- Child agency: County of Hawaiʻi, Office of the Prosecuting Attorney

Facilities
- Stations: Hilo, Kona

Website
- County of Hawaii, Office of the Prosecuting Attorney Website

The County of Hawaiʻi, Office of the Prosecuting Attorney, Criminal Investigations Unit is the law enforcement agency for the County of Hawaiʻi, Office of the Prosecuting Attorney. It is tasked with full state police powers to: enforces all State laws and Department rules; conduct investigations of the most complex, confidential and diverse civil/criminal cases being considered and/or readied for court action and prosecution; obtains additional information, evidence, and facts to clarify or substantiate findings of law enforcement agencies; secures, interviews, and interrogates witnesses complainants, and suspects.

== Investigators ==
The County Prosecutor's Office, Criminal Investigation Units (Hawaiʻi County, Kauaʻi County, Honolulu City and County, and Maui County) come under the authority of and are subordinate to the Hawaii Department of the Attorney General. HCC Article IX, Section 9-3 (a) (3)

Investigators are armed and have the powers and privileges of police officers with statewide jurisdiction to effect arrest, and conduct criminal investigations. Most Investigators are already experienced law enforcement officers with other state or local police agencies prior to being employed with the Office.

Investigators conduct investigations of the most complex, confidential, and diverse criminal cases being considered and/or readied for court action and prosecution, they also conduct highly confidential investigations for the State Attorney General's Office.

These investigations involve such areas as; fugitive warrant investigations and extraditions, homeland security, tactical intelligence operations, organized crime, special career criminal suppression, environmental crimes, cold homicide cases, the processes and service of legal papers, and other criminal and civil matters.

Investigators works closely with the Hawaiʻi Police Department, other State agencies, the US military, and federal law enforcement agencies, and all levels of the court system.

== Agency description ==
Under authority of the Attorney General; the Office of the Prosecuting Attorney is the legal agency responsible for prosecuting all violations of State and County laws, ordinances, rules, and/or regulations on behalf of the Big Island community as provided by Hawaiʻi County Charter Article IX: Chapter 28; H.R.S. 28–1.

== Prosecuting Attorney Office, Criminal Investigations Unit, ranks structure ==
Criminal Investigations Units uses the Hawaii State Law Enforcement Rank Structure and are subordinate to the Hawaii Attorney General:

- Attorney General Chief Special Investigator, EM-07
- Attorney General Chief Investigator, EM-05

- CIU Chief Investigator, SR-26 (Colonel) [OR] EM-3
- Investigator V-a, SR-24 (Commander)
- Investigator V-b, SR-24 (Captain )
- Investigator IV, SR-22 (Lieutenant)
- Investigator III, SR-20 (Sergeant)
- Investigator II, SR-18 (Corporal)
- Investigator I, SR-16 (Officer)

== Victim services ==
Investigator's work with the Victim Service Unit in helping crime victims through the difficult process.

== See also ==
- List of law enforcement agencies in Hawaii
- Government of Hawaii
