= Commercial vehicle inspection =

Commercial vehicle inspection (CVI), is the enforcement of safety regulations and laws of commercial vehicles. Some U.S. state departments of transportation refer to it as commercial vehicle enforcement (CVE). CVI enforcement can be done roadside by state troopers or at specific stations, sometimes called "weigh stations".

Below are of some of the things that are checked for:

- inadequate tires
- brake linings that are oil soaked
- cracked brake linings
- brake linings with inadequate (worn) thickness
- cracked frames
- fuel leaks
- disqualified drivers
- overweight vehicles
- oversize vehicles (vehicle dimensions)
- hours-of-service (how long a driver has driven for)
- driver qualifications
- permit conditions
- cargo securement
- mechanical fitness
- insurance status
