= South Dakota Highway Patrol =

- Patch of South Dakota Highway Patrol
- Abbreviation: SDHP

Agency overview
- Formed: 1956; 70 years ago
- Preceding agencies: Courtesy Patrol (1935–1937); Motor Patrol (1937–1956)
- Employees: 269 (as of 2017)

Jurisdictional structure
- Operations jurisdiction: South Dakota, USA
- Area: 77,116 square miles (199,730 km^{2})
- Population: 895,376 (2022 est.)
- General nature: Civilian police

Operational structure
- Headquarters: Pierre, South Dakota
- Troopers: 193 (authorised, as of 2019)
- Civilians: 80 (as of 2014)
- Agency executive: Colonel Casey Collins, Superintendent
- Parent agency: South Dakota Department of Public Safety
- Districts: 5

Website
- South Dakota Highway Patrol website

The South Dakota Highway Patrol is the state police agency for South Dakota, which has jurisdiction everywhere in the state except for sovereign Native American reservations. It was created to protect the lives, property and constitutional rights of people in South Dakota. In addition to enforcement of laws, the SDHP has regional SWAT teams that provide tactical and warrant services to police and Sheriff Departments. The SDHP is also responsible for training K-9 teams to law enforcement agencies in South Dakota. The SDHP also has a division responsible for executive protection of the state dignitaries and protection of the capital grounds and administrative state buildings and grounds.

== Jurisdiction ==
Troopers with the South Dakota Highway Patrol are entrusted with the authority to conduct investigations concerning violations of criminal and traffic statutes throughout the state, regardless of city, township, or county boundaries.

Including traffic enforcement, in communities that already have a police presence, the South Dakota Highway Patrol may respond to citizen calls. The South Dakota Highway Patrol has statewide jurisdiction, and frequently assists other agencies with emergency calls for service ranging from accidents, criminal investigations to fights in progress. As a mission of the South Dakota Highway Patrol, they will preserve peace and order.

Headquarters staff are based out of Pierre. A Motor Carrier Division is also headquartered in Pierre.

== History ==
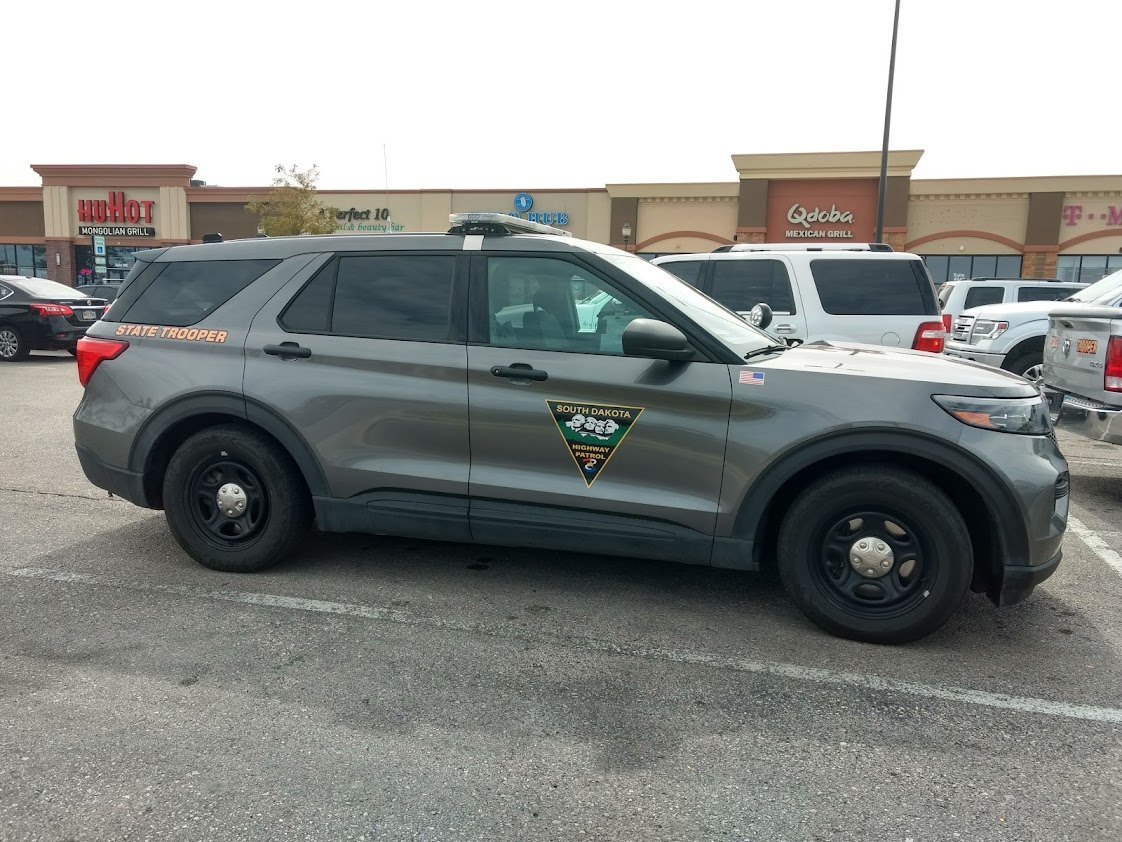
South Dakota Highway Patrol Ford Police Interceptor Utility (Explorer)

In 1935, the Governor of South Dakota, Tom Berry, recognized the need for an organization to enforce the traffic laws and provide assistance to the motoring public. Governor Berry appointed ten men that were known as the "Courtesy Patrol", tasked with enforcing all the laws in South Dakota and helping to inform the public about the state's emerging traffic regulations. The officers were assigned to patrol the 2,000 miles (3,200 km) of hard-surfaced roads and 4,000 miles (6,400 km) of gravel highways.

The legislature abolished the Department of Justice in 1937 and the authority for the Highway Patrol was transferred to the Highway Department. The Courtesy Patrol was disbanded and the new Motor Patrol was founded, with Superintendent Walter J. Goetz. Chief Goetz increased the number of Motor Patrolmen from eight to forty and his tenure is most noted for the acquisition of two-way radios for each patrol car in 1948.

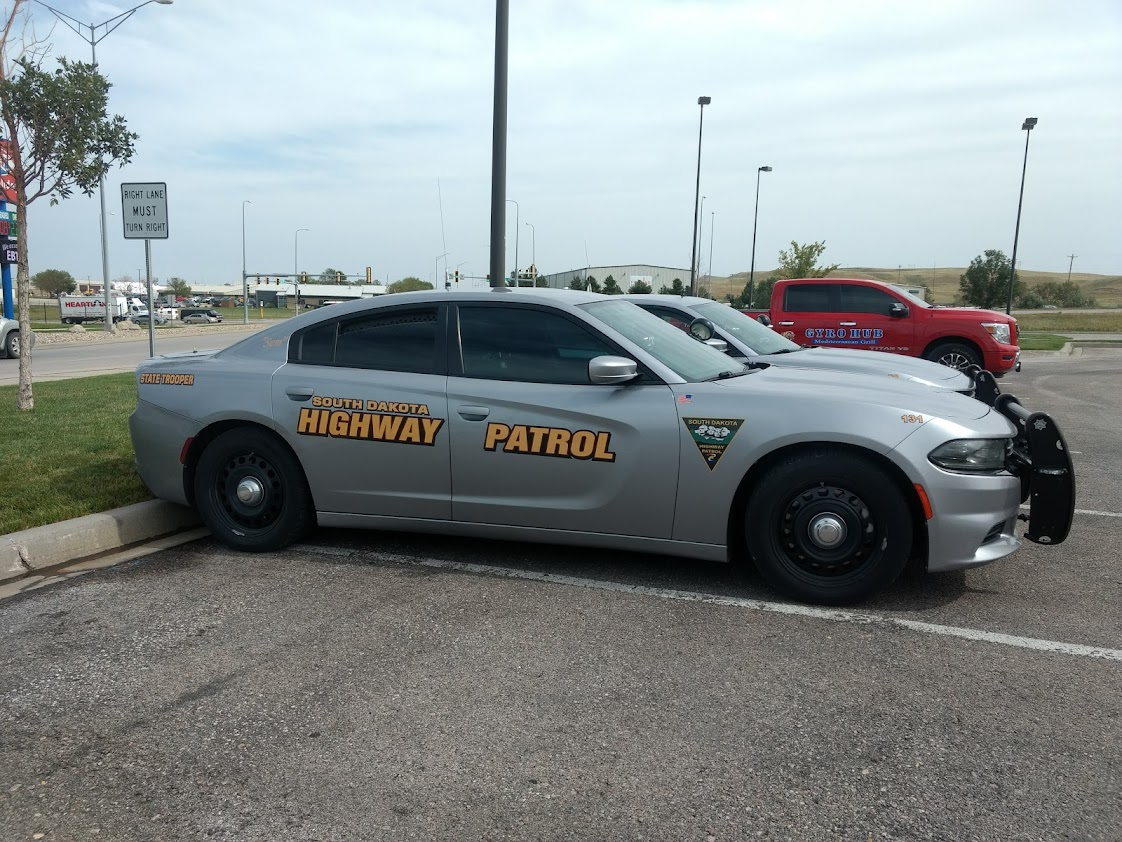
South Dakota Highway Patrol Dodge Charger Pursuit

The Patrol was involved in many life-saving efforts during the record blizzard of 1949. The blizzards and floods of 1952 taxed the resources of the Motor Patrol. 1953 ushered in the South Dakota Drivers License and 179 people died on South Dakota roads.

A 40 million dollar highway construction project began in 1956 and the role of the Motor Patrolman as an enforcement officer began to change. Traffic fatalities were on the rise and the Patrol was given a mandate to reduce fatal accidents.

1958 saw the Oahe Dam closure completed and a record 240 people died on South Dakota roads. By executive order, various colored and unmarked patrol vehicles were utilized for a time to help reduce the death toll from traffic accidents. The port of entry system was started on a trial basis.

A SWAT division was established in 1974.The SDHP is the premier tactical team that is often utilized for high risk search warrants and fugitive apprehensions. SWAT Troopers are strategically placed throughout the state and within their districts to ensure a quick deployment. Many of the troopers assigned to SWAT are specialists in other law enforcement operations as well.

Currently, the sidearm for the SDHP is the FN 509 chambered in 9mm with an optic and weapon light.

In the late 1990s and early 2000s, the SDHP stopped Governor Bill Janklow 16 times for traffic violations, but never ticketed him. In 2003, Janklow caused a fatal automobile crash, for which he was convicted of vehicular manslaughter. The SDHP is widely respected as a premier full service law enforcement agency, steeped in tradition and known for their ability to perform at very high levels. Troopers are well respected and highly regarded in their communities and in the South Dakota law enforcement community. In 2025, Colonel Casey Collins was appointed Colonel, replacing Richard Miller, who replaced Craig Price. This transition from Miller to Collins is more in line with Highway Patrol tradition, as both earned and rose through the ranks, thus having an immediate positive impact on trooper retention and hiring that was absent during Superintendent Price’s command, who did not rise through the ranks, rather was a political appointment.

== Fallen officers ==
Since the establishment of the South Dakota Highway Patrol, five troopers have died while on duty.

== See also ==
- List of law enforcement agencies in South Dakota
- State police
- State patrol
- Highway patrol
