= Kauaʻi County Police Department =

Law enforcement department on Kauaʻi, Hawaii

Coordinates: 21.97645°N 159.35514°W

The Kauaʻi County Police Department (KPD) provides law enforcement for a population of 72,133 people within 619.96 square miles (1,605.7 km^{2}) of the island of Kauaʻi.

== Organization ==
The current chief of police is Rudy Tai. The KPD currently employs approximately 150 sworn personnel and about 50 non-sworn civilian support staff. The KPD is divided into three bureaus:

- Patrol Services Bureau- contains emergency dispatch, cell block, three patrol platoons, and a traffic safety section.
- Investigative Services Bureau- is divided into three sections: Adult, Youth Services, and Vice.
- Administrative and Technical Bureau- is largely a civilian support section and contains the following: Personnel, Records, Training, Identification (CSI), Evidence, Fleet, and Telecommunications (TTY).

== Political Controversy ==
In the past, members of the Kauai Police Department faced allegations of corruption and favoritism. In the early 2000s, former police chief, K.C. Lum, who was promoted from the vice division, was accused of favoritism, and ethics allegations. Additionally, the department faced sexual harassment allegations. In September 2014, the department was unaccredited. The FBI also investigated the alleged Kauai Police corruption. None of the officers who came under scrutiny are associated with the department any longer.

== See also ==
- State of Hawaii Organization of Police Officers
- Honolulu Police Department
- Hawaii Department of Public Safety
- List of law enforcement agencies in Hawaii
