= Mario Brooks =

Police Commissioner of the United States Virgin Islands

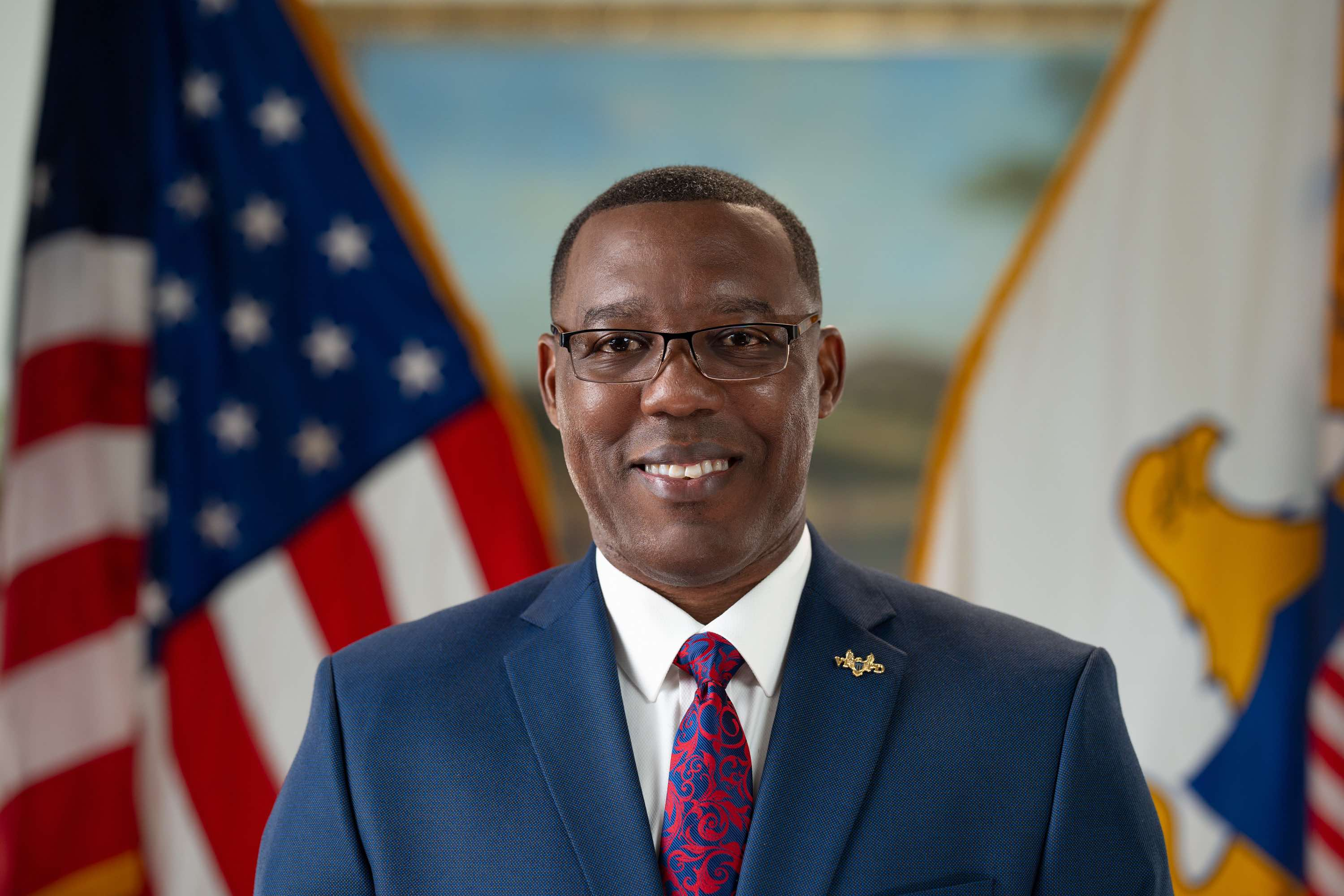

Commissioner of the United States Virgin Islands Police Department
- Incumbent
- Assumed office January 23, 2025 (Note: Acting: June 16, 2024 – January 23, 2025, Mario Brooks served as acting Police Commissioner following Martinez’s resignation)
- Governor: Albert Bryan
- Preceded by: Ray Martinez

Assistant Commissioner of the United States Virgin Islands Police Department
- In office January 14, 2020 – June 16, 2024
- Appointed by: Trevor Velinor

Personal details
- Born: Mario M. Brooks; December 28, 1971 (age 54) St. Thomas, U.S. Virgin Islands
- Education: Webster University (MA); University of the Virgin Islands (AA, BA)
- Salary: $135,000

Mario M. Brooks (born December 28, 1971) is the Commissioner of the United States Virgin Islands Police Department. He was nominated by Governor Albert Bryan to assume the position following the resignation of former Commissioner Ray Martinez in June 2024.

== Early life and education ==
A native of St. Thomas, U.S. Virgin Islands. Brooks is the grandson of the late John and Beatrice Brooks of George Hill, Anguilla. As a child, he attended The Valley Primary School and Albena Lake Hodge Comprehensive School.

Brooks later relocated to the mainland United States, where he attended the Miami Lakes Technical School, Clark Atlanta University. He earned an MA in Business and Organizational Security Management from George Herbert Walker School of Business and Technology.

== Career ==
=== Virgin Islands National Guard ===
Brooks has 27 years of military service. He was the Brigade Operations Officer for the Virgin Islands National Guard. Prior to that, he was Deputy inspector general and commander of Military Police Detachment.

=== United States Virgin Islands Police Department ===
With over 25 years of service to the Virgin Islands Islands Police Department. Brooks has worked in the Bureaus of Special Operations and Criminal Intelligence. In 2020, Police Commissioner Trevor Velinor selected him to serve as Assistant Commissioner of Police.

In May 2026, Brooks was elected to serve as First Vice President of the Caribbean Police Commissioners Association.
