= Hawaii Department of Law Enforcement =

American law enforcement agency

Hawaii Department of Law Enforcement Hawaiʻi Ka ʻOihana Hoʻokō Kānāwai (Hawaiian)
- Seal of Hawaii
- Abbreviation: DLE

Agency overview
- Formed: January 1, 2024
- Preceding agency: Hawaii Department of Public Safety

Jurisdictional structure
- Operations jurisdiction: Hawaii, U.S.
- Map of Hawaii Department of Law Enforcement's jurisdiction
- Area: 10,931 square miles (28,310 km^{2})
- Population: 1,455,271 (2020 census)
- General nature: Civilian police

Operational structure
- Headquarters: Honolulu, Hawaii
- Agency executives: Mike Lambert, Director; Ernest J Robello, Deputy Director of Administration; Jared K. Redulla, Deputy Director of Law Enforcement

Website
- https://law.hawaii.gov/

The Hawaii Department of Law Enforcement (DLE; Hawaiian: Hawaiʻi Ka ʻOihana Hoʻokō Kānāwai) is a department within the executive branch of the government of the U.S. state of Hawaii. The department, which commenced operations on January 1, 2024, was created to merge several previously separate law enforcement functions among the Department of the Attorney General, Department of Transportation, and Department of Public Safety into a single department to improve efficiency.

== Organization ==
The Department of Law Enforcement has the following divisions: Administration, Law Enforcement, Office of Homeland Security, Office of the Inspector General, and CALEA Office.

=== Administration Division ===
The Administration Division provides administrative and support services to the department, including fiscal management, human resources, and information technology.

=== Law Enforcement Division ===
The Law Enforcement Division provides law enforcement and investigative services to the State of Hawaii.

==== Narcotics Enforcement Division ====
The Narcotics Enforcement Division enforces laws and regulations and investigates criminal activity relating to controlled substances, medical marijuana, and prescription drug diversion. It also provides training on the aforementioned matters to law enforcement partners and healthcare professionals.

==== Sheriff Division ====
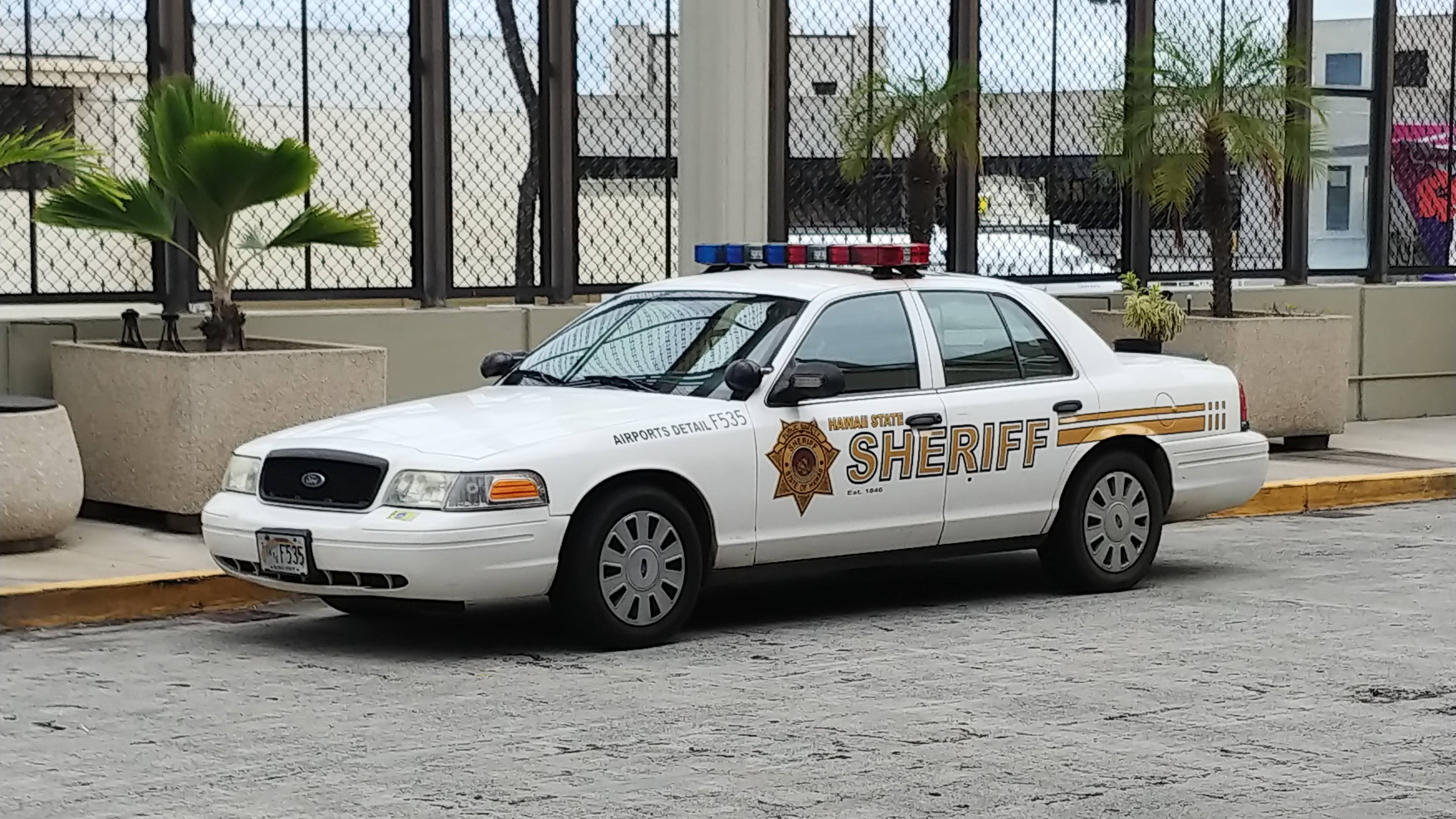
Hawaii State Sheriff Division Ford Crown Victoria Police Interceptor

The Sheriff Division is the de facto state police and capitol police force of the state. As Hawaii is an archipelago, the state has no need for a regular state police or highway patrol agency. The Sheriff Division provides law enforcement, security, and court bailiff services to state properties like the state capitol, the judiciary, and other designated locations such as the Daniel K. Inouye International Airport. The Sheriff Division also provides personal protection for key state officials, including the Governor and Lieutenant Governor.

- State Sheriff
  - Secretary
  - First Deputy Sheriff
    - Special Investigations Office
    - Staff Services Office
    - Dispatch Office
    - Deputy Sheriff V — Operations Branch
      - Criminal Investigation Section — functions transferred to the DLE Criminal Investigation Division.
      - Program Support Section
      - Security Section
      - Special Operations Section
        - Fugitive Unit
        - Canine Unit
        - Prisoner Transport Unit
        - Clerical Support Staff
      - Records Section
        - Receiving Desk Unit
        - Records Unit
        - Evidence Unit
      - Capitol Patrol Section
      - Executive Protection Section
      - Circuit Court Section
      - District Court Section
      - Kapolei Court Section
      - Airport Section
      - Hawaii Section
      - Kauai Section
      - Maui Section

=== Office of Homeland Security ===
The Office of Homeland Security's (OHS) primary responsibility is to prevent, protect, mitigate, respond to, and help the state to recover from man-made attacks, natural disasters and emerging threats.

==== Intelligence Enforcement Unit ====
The Intelligence Enforcement Unit is the investigative component of the Office of Homeland Security. The unit investigates matters related to homeland security, such as terrorist attacks, as well as organized crime, cyber threats and attacks, and threats and attacks against critical state infrastructure. The unit is headed by an Investigator VI (Chief Investigator) and it is staffed by multiple Investigator V's.

=== Office of the Inspector General ===
The Office of the Inspector General, named after federal counterparts with the same name, is the internal affairs arm of the department which investigates crimes and misconduct committed by its members.

=== CALEA Office ===
The CALEA Office handles matters related to the department's relationship with the Commission on Accreditation for Law Enforcement Agencies (CALEA).

== See also ==
- Police
- Law enforcement
- List of law enforcement agencies in Hawaii
- State police (United States)
