= List of law enforcement agencies in Hawaii =

This is a list of law enforcement agencies located in Hawaii.

According to the US Bureau of Justice Statistics' 2008 Census of State and Local Law Enforcement Agencies, the state had 7 law enforcement agencies employing 3,234 sworn police officers, about 251 for each 100,000 residents. Hawaii is unique in that it is the only state within the U.S. that does not have a state police, state patrol, or highway patrol. However, the Sheriff Division of the Hawaii Department of Law Enforcement (DLE) serves as the de facto state police (and capitol police) agency of Hawaii. Conversely, the DLE Sheriff Division is the only sheriff’s department in the U.S. that officially serves the entire state. Additionally, investigators of the DLE serve as statewide investigators with full police powers across the state, akin to other state criminal investigatory agencies, such as the Georgia Bureau of Investigation or Colorado Bureau of Investigation.

== State agencies ==
- State of Hawaii Department of the Attorney General
- Hawaii Division of Conservation and Resource Enforcement
- Hawaii Department of Corrections and Rehabilitation
- Hawaii Department of Law Enforcement
  - Sheriff Division
  - Criminal Investigation Division
  - Hawaii Office of Homeland Security (OHS)
- Hawaii Department of Taxation

== County agencies ==
- Hawai‘i County Police Department - Hawai‘i
- Kaua‘i County Police Department - Kaua‘i, Ni‘ihau
- Maui County Police Department - Maui, Moloka‘i, Lāna‘ī, Kaho‘olawe
- The sheriff of Kalawao County located on the Kalaupapa Peninsula on the north coast of the island of Moloka'i and the smallest US county, is selected from among the 86 local residents (86 total population per the 2019 estimate of the US Census Bureau), by the Hawaii Department of Health, which administers the county. The sheriff is the sole county government employee.

== Consolidated city-county agencies ==
- Honolulu Police Department – Honolulu Police Department is responsible for police services on the entire island of Oʻahu.
