= United States Virgin Islands Police Department =

United States Virgin Islands Police Department Police Department of the United States Virgin Islands
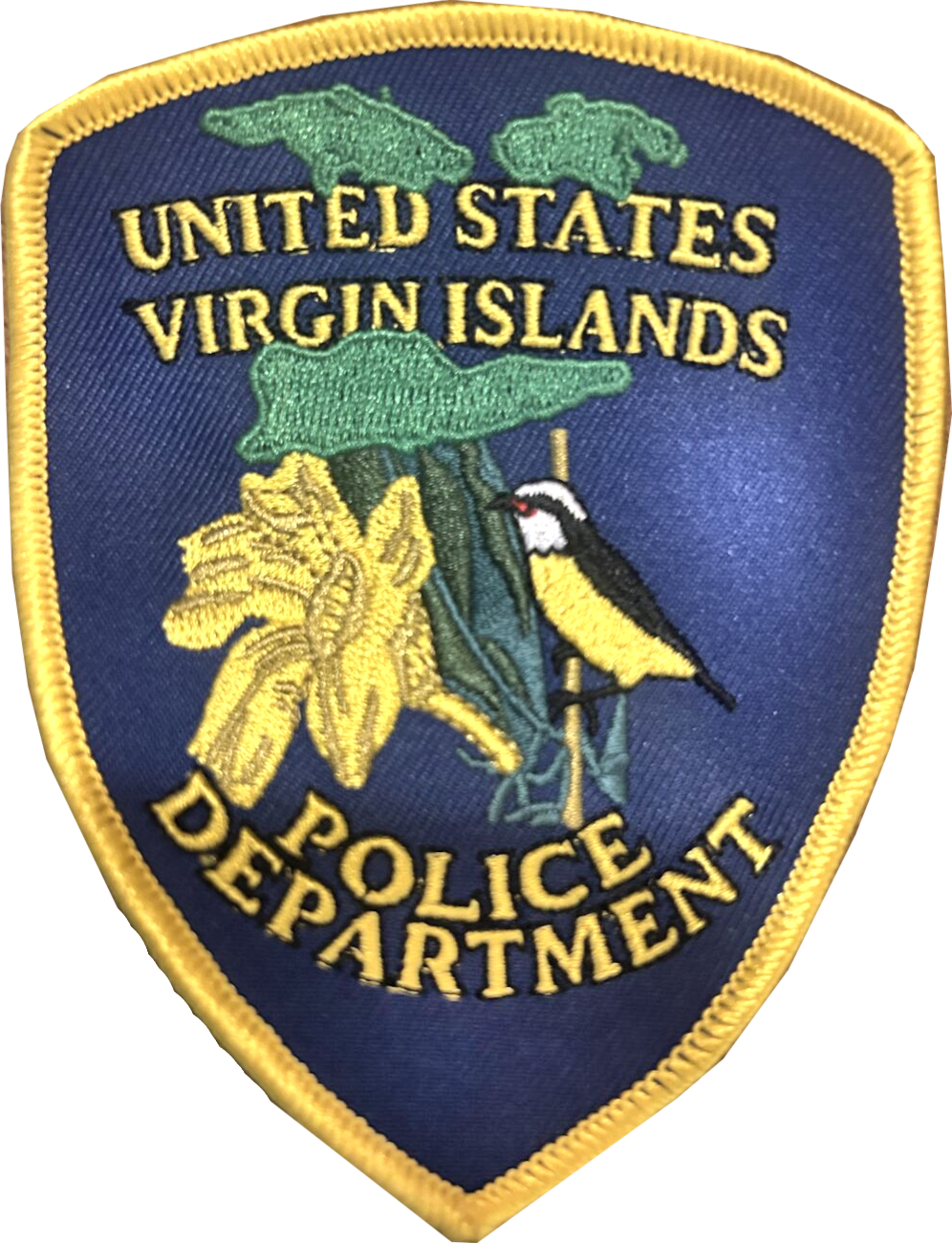
- Virgin Islands Police patch, introduced in 2020

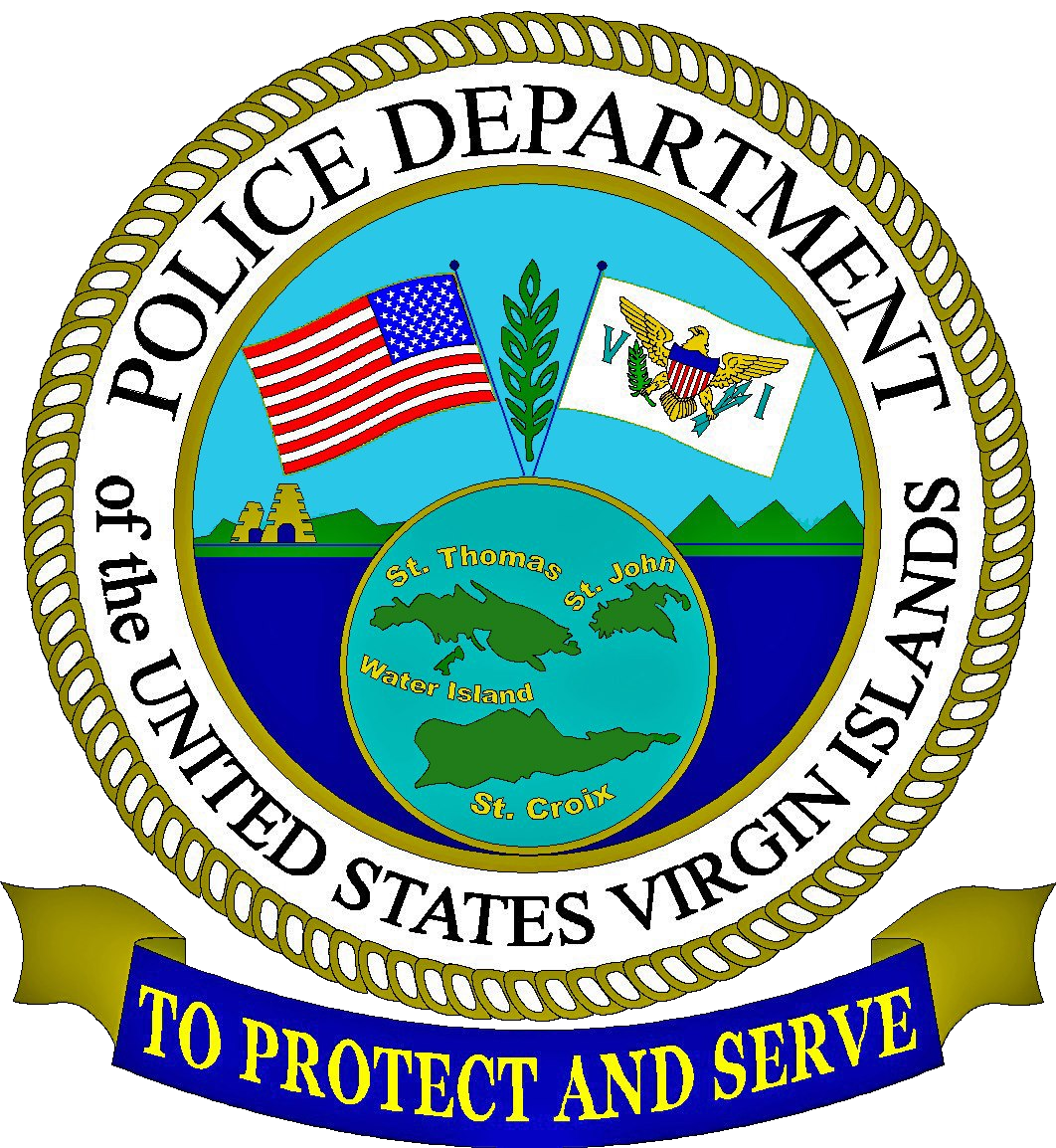
- Great Seal, adopted in 2003

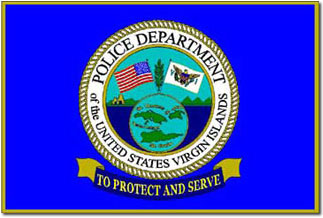
- Flag of the VIPD
- Common name: Virgin Islands Police Department
- Abbreviation: VIPD

Agency overview
- Formed: 1955

Jurisdictional structure
- Legal jurisdiction: United States Virgin Islands

Operational structure
- Headquarters: Alexander Farrelly Criminal Justice Center
- Agency executives: Mario Brooks, Commissioner; Sean Santos, Assistant Commissioner; Uston Cornelius, St. Croix Chief of Police; Naomi Joseph, St. Croix Deputy Chief of Police; Deborah L. Hodge, St. Thomas-St. John Chief of Police; Rael Donastorg, St. Thomas/Water Island Deputy Chief of Police

Website
- vipd.vi.gov

The United States Virgin Islands Police Department (VIPD), officially the Police Department of the United States Virgin Islands, is the law enforcement agency of the U.S. Virgin Islands, and has jurisdiction anywhere in the territory. It is commanded by a commissioner, who is subject to the authority of the governor.

== History ==
Under the 1936 Organic Act of the Virgin Islands, law enforcement was divided between the municipality of St. Thomas and St. John and the municipality of St. Croix, each of which had a separate Police and Prison Department.

In 1954, revisions were made to the Organic Act that required that the municipal departments be reorganized as part of a territorial executive branch.

The current Virgin Islands Police Department traces its origin to the establishment of the Department of Public Safety, which contained a Police Division, on July 21, 1955.

In 1981, the department adopted a new patch, which was used until November 2020 when a new one was introduced. The department was renamed the U.S. Virgin Islands Police Department in 1985. In 2003, the department adopted a seal, which is also featured on its flag.

In December 2025, the United States Department of Justice sued the Virgin Islands for "unconstitutional" practices regarding gun rights.

== Line of duty deaths ==
The VIPD has lost 15 officers since founding.

Detective Delberth Phipps, Jr. - July 4, 2023

Police Officer Colvin Terrance Georges, Sr. - September 29, 2012

Police Officer Akeem Basil "Teddy" Newton - January 20, 2008

Police Officer Ariel Anton Frett - February 8, 2007

Police Officer Cuthbert Ezekiel Chapman - April 26, 2004

Police Officer Steven Alexis Hodge - March 27, 1994

Police Officer Dexter L. Mardenborough - January 27, 1991

Police Officer Richard Nicolas Callwood - December 29, 1980

Patrolman Wilbur Horatio Francis - July 30, 1977

Patrolman Patrick Emmanuel Sweeney, Sr. - October 27, 1975

Patrolman Allan Williams - October 29, 1971

Patrolman Rudel Albert Parrott - July 1, 1971

Patrolman Leroy Alvaro Swan - February 26, 1965

Patrolman Leopold Emanuel Fredericks, Jr. - August 28, 1963

Patrolman Lionel Emanuel Isaac - May 18, 1948

== Fleet ==
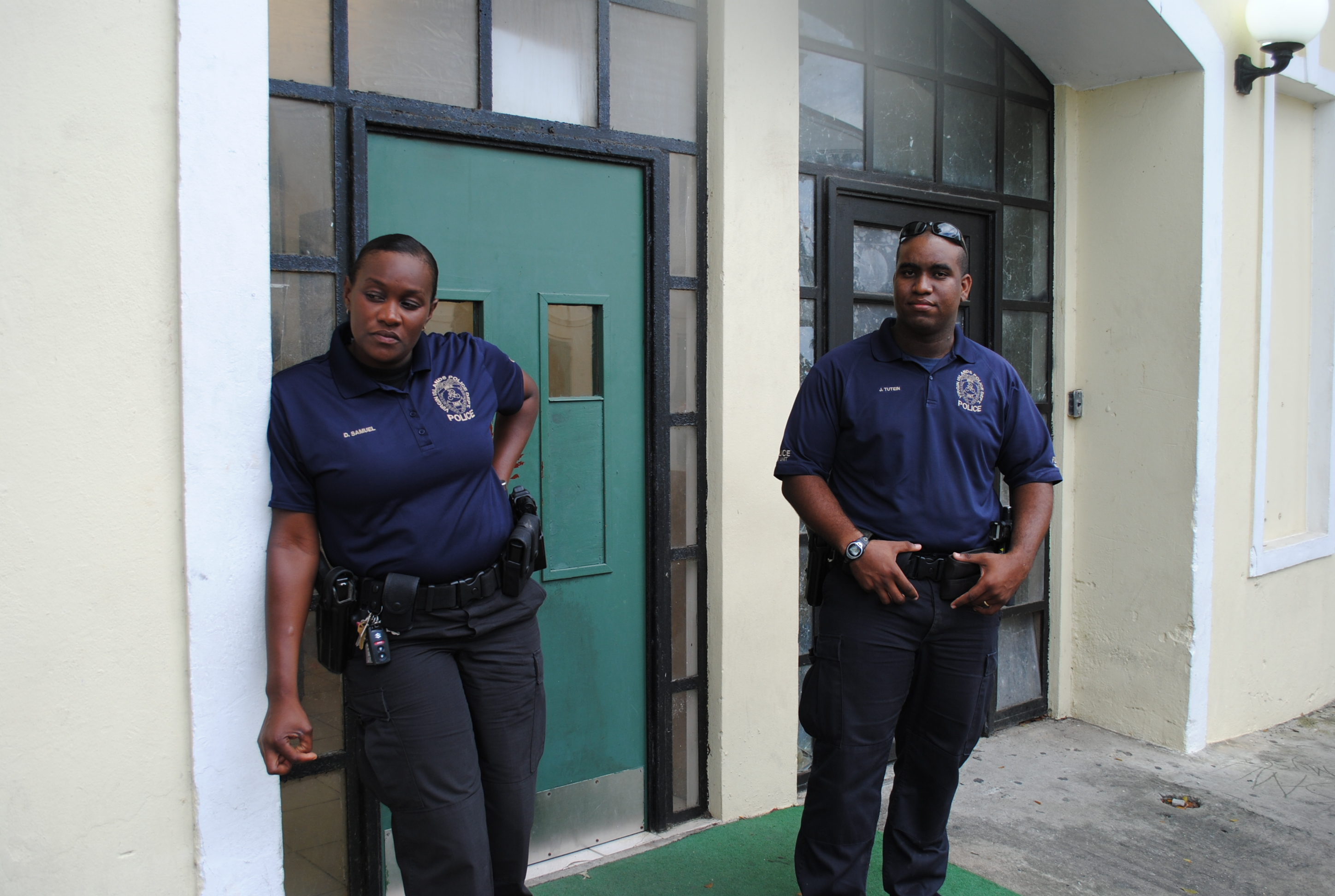
VIPD officers in 2012

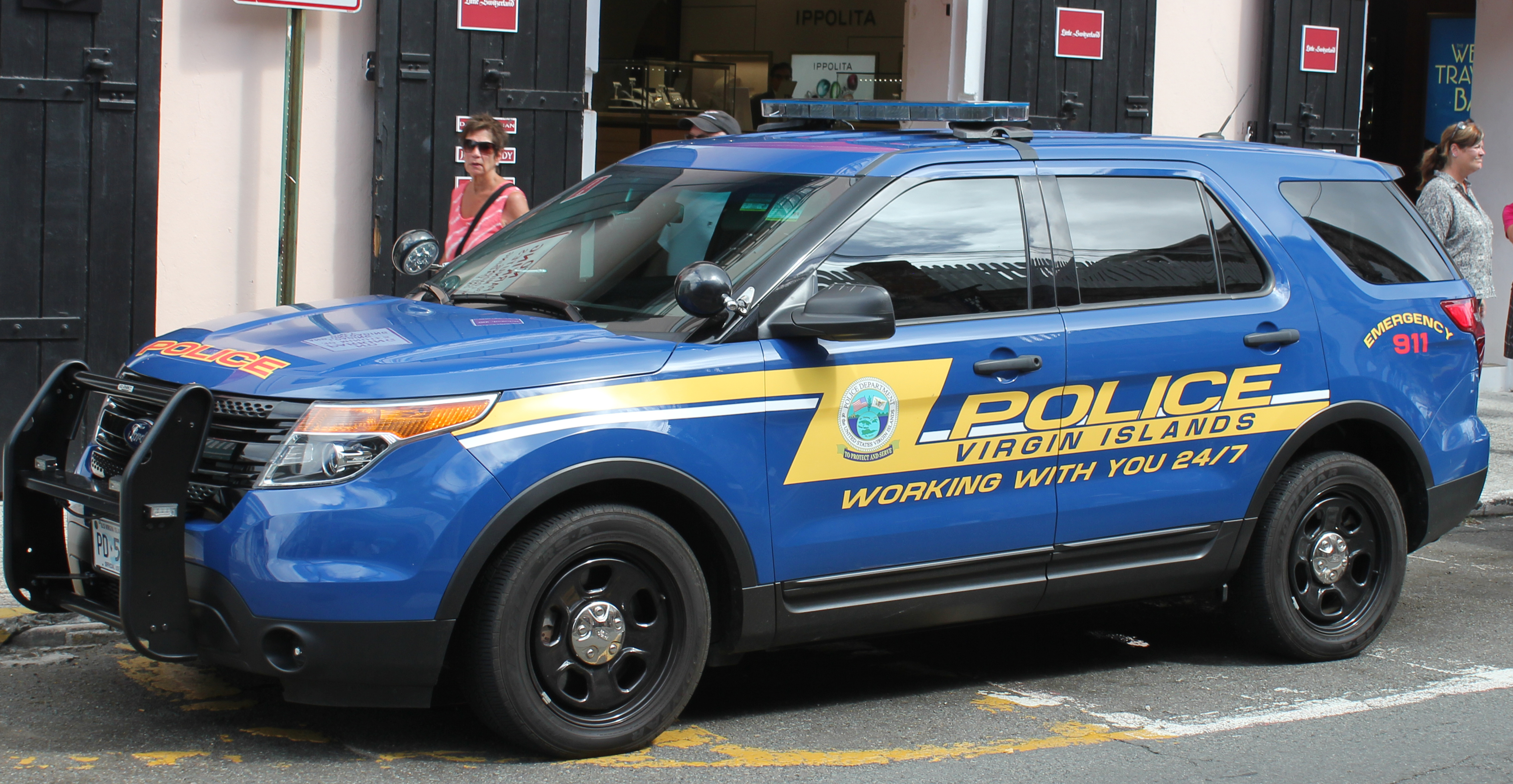
Ford Police Interceptor Utility in VIPD service

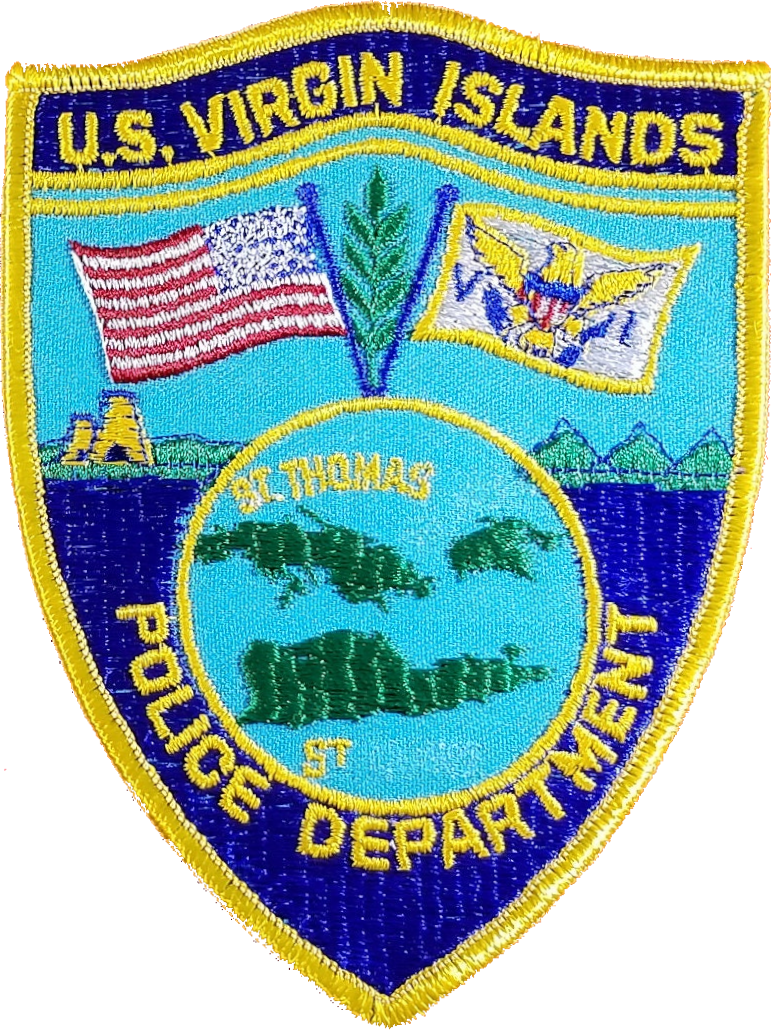
Old VIPD patch, used from 1981 to 2020.

The VIPD operates a variety of vehicles, including cars and SUVs. In 2018 it acquired a fleet of Segways and electric cars for patrolling downtown areas of St. Thomas.
