= South Dakota Department of Public Safety =

Department overview
- Headquarters: Pierre, South Dakota
- Department executive: Trevor Jones, Cabinet Secretary for the Department of Public Safety
- Website: www.dps.sd.gov

The South Dakota Department of Public Safety (DPS) is a state agency in South Dakota, United States. DPS is an enforcement, licensing and services agency that develops and operates programs in the areas of law enforcement, traffic safety, fire safety, driver's licenses, emergency management, and public safety information. The Secretary of Public Safety is appointed by the governor of South Dakota.

== Divisions ==
The Department of Public Safety maintains 11 agencies with specific functions related to public safety within the state.

- South Dakota Office of Accident Records - Maintains a database of motor vehicle accident information from public roadways.
- South Dakota Office of Drivers License Services - Issues driver's licenses and state-issued identification cards.
- South Dakota Office of Emergency Management - Protects citizens and their property from the impact of natural, man-made, and technological disasters with preparedness, response, and recovery along with mitigation.
- South Dakota State Fire Marshal - Assists local fire departments with training, fire investigations, and code enforcement.
- South Dakota Highway Patrol - State Law Enforcement Agency that assists motorists, investigates traffic accidents, enforces traffic laws and similar laws, and assists other law enforcement agencies throughout the state.
- South Dakota Office of Highway Safety - Provides public education and support to reduce the number of roadway accidents.
- South Dakota Office of Homeland Security - Works to prevent terrorism and enhance security and to respond to all hazardous incidents.
- South Dakota State 911 Coordinator - Assists local agencies and communities with emergency telecommunications.
- South Dakota Weights and Measures - Verifies commercial measuring and weighing devices to ensure accuracy and credibility between businesses and consumers.
- South Dakota State Inspections Program - Inspects restaurants and school lunches, state lottery, school fire/life safety, daycare safety, farm/ranch safety, meters, and fuel pumps.

== See also ==
- United States Department of Homeland Security
- Federal Emergency Management Agency
- Transportation in South Dakota
