= Hawaiʻi County Police Department =

American law enforcement agency

Coordinates: 19.71540°N 155.0863°W

- Common name: Hawaiʻi Police Department
- Abbreviation: HPD

Jurisdictional structure
- Operations jurisdiction: Hawaii, United States
- Legal jurisdiction: County of Hawaiʻi
- General nature: Civilian police

Operational structure
- Headquarters: Hilo, Hawaii
- Agency executives: Benjamin Moszkowicz, Chief; Reed Mahuna, Deputy Chief
- Parent agency: Hawaiʻi County, Hawaii

The Hawaiʻi County Police Department provides police services for the island of Hawaiʻi, known locally as the "Big Island". According to the 2010 Census, it covers 4,028.02 square miles (10,433 km^{2}) of varied terrain with 185,079 residents and thousands of visitors.

== Operation Bureaus ==
Benjamin Moszkowicz was appointed Chief of Hawaiʻi Police Department by the Hawaiʻi County Police Commission on December 16, 2022. Chief Moszkowicz comes to Hawaiʻi Island from Honolulu Police Department, where he most recently served as Major in the Traffic Division. (https://www.hawaiipolice.com/about-us/police-chief#:~:text=Police%20Chief%20Benjamin%20Moszkowicz,Major%20in%20the%20Traffic%20Division.) For police purposes the island is divided into two areas:

- Area I: east Hawaiʻi, which includes the districts of Hāmakua, North Hilo, South Hilo and Puna, with total area of 1,685 square miles (4,360 km^{2})
- Area II: west Hawaiʻi, which includes North Kohala, South Kohala, North Kona, South Kona, and Ka'ū, an area of 2,345 square miles (6,070 km^{2}).

Each district is headed by a police captain, and each area by a commander.

== Police Vehicle ==
Hawaiʻi County Police has a fleet of marked police cars as well as subsidized police cars, meaning personally owned vehicles allowed to be used as police cars. The subsidized vehicles must meet certain requirements to qualify, such as (but not limited to) engine size and body style.

== See also ==
- State of Hawaii Organization of Police Officers
- Honolulu Police Department
- Hawaii Department of Public Safety
- List of law enforcement agencies in Hawaii
