= List of Hawaii state prisons =

This list includes all state prisons used by the state of Hawaii. It does not include federal prisons located in the U.S. state of Hawaii.

== Hawaii State prisons ==
- Halawa Correctional Facility – Aiea
- Hawaii Youth Correctional Facility – Kailua
- Kulani Correctional Facility – Hilo (inmate capacity approx. 200)
- Waiawa Correctional Facility – Waipahu (inmate capacity 334)
- Women's Community Correctional Center – Kailua (inmate capacity 50)

== Hawaii Department of Corrections and Rehabilitation jails ==
The Hawaii Department of Corrections and Rehabilitation also operates the jails in the state. There are no county jails in Hawaii.

- Hawaii Community Correctional Center – Hilo
- Kauai Community Correctional Center – Lihue
- Maui Community Correctional Center – Wailuku
- Oahu Community Correctional Center – Honolulu

== Mainland facilities ==
As of 2016 one correctional facility on the mainland is contracted to house Hawaii's prisoners: the Saguaro Correctional Center in Eloy, Arizona, operated by Corrections Corporation of America.

Previously, female prisoners were at Otter Creek Correctional Center in Kentucky, but they were returned to Hawaii in 2009 after a sexual scandal. Hawaii also ended its contract with CCA to house male inmates at its Red Rock Correctional Center in 2014.
