= Hawaii Department of Public Safety =

American law enforcement agency

- Patch of the Correction Division

- Patch of the Law Enforcement Division
- Abbreviation: DPS

Agency overview
- Dissolved: December 31, 2023
- Employees: 2,263 (as of 2006)

Jurisdictional structure
- Operations jurisdiction: Hawaii, U.S.
- Map of Hawaii Department of Public Safety's jurisdiction
- Area: 10,931 square miles (28,310 km^{2})
- Population: 1,283,388 (2007 est.)
- General nature: Civilian police

Operational structure
- Headquarters: Honolulu, Hawaii
- Deputy Sheriffs Narcotics Enforcement Agents: 300 (authorised, as of 2022)

Facilities
- Prisons: 4
- Jails: 4

Website
- https://dps.hawaii.gov/

The Hawaii Department of Public Safety was a department within the executive branch of the government of the U.S. state of Hawaii. It was headquartered in the 919 Ala Moana Boulevard building in Honolulu, Hawaii. At the time of its deactivation, the Department of Public Safety was made up of three divisions: Administration, Corrections, and Law Enforcement.

Pursuant to the Hawaii Bill HB 2171, the Department of Public Safety was deactivated on December 31, 2023 and its personnel, duties, and functions were transferred to two new separate departments: the Hawaii Department of Corrections and Rehabilitation and the Hawaii Department of Law Enforcement. Per the bill, the Hawaii State Legislature found that the goals and functions of corrections and law enforcement are different and distinct and separating the functions of corrections and law enforcement from the department of public safety into two separate departments would best accomplish the discrete goals and objectives of both functions.

== Divisions ==
=== Administration Division ===
The Administration Division provides support services that enable the corrections staff to fulfill their responsibilities. Some of these services include training and staff development, fiscal and personnel management, management of the operating budget and capital improvements program budget, procurement, and management information systems and research.

=== Corrections Division ===
==== Prisons ====
The Corrections Division oversees four prisons. Three of the prisons are located on the island of Oahu and one on the island of Hawaii. They include:

- Halawa Correctional Facility
- Waiawa Correctional Facility
- Women's Community Correctional Center
- Kulani Correctional Facility in Hawaii County, on the island of Hawaii, which was closed in 2009 and reopened in 2014

==== Private prisons ====
In 1995 the State of Hawaii began contracting with prisons outside of Hawaii to house prisoners from Hawaii. The criteria for sending inmates to private prisons on the mainland include a minimum sentence of 24 months, a lack of pending criminal cases in Hawaii, and a lack of major health and medical issues. Attorney Daphne Barbee said that she had clients with cases pending who were sent to the mainland anyway. According to Kevin Dayton of the Honolulu Advertiser, some inmates prefer to stay on the mainland for superior educational programs, drug treatment programs, and other programs that a prisoner would complete before being considered for parole. Other prisoners, particularly those with young children and families, prefer to stay in Hawaii.

The Mainland Section initially contracted with three facilities, one in Kentucky and two in Arizona, to house prisoners sentenced in Hawaii.

The Kentucky prison, Otter Creek Correctional Center, was a designated women's prison run by Corrections Corporation of America. After numerous reports of prison staff sexually abusing inmates, Hawaii brought its prisoners home from the facility in August 2009. CCA closed the facility in 2013.

The state also removed its prisoners from CCA's Red Rock Correctional Center in Arizona in 2014.

About 1,900 male Hawaii state inmates are held at CCA's Saguaro Correctional Center in Eloy, Arizona. This represents the majority of Hawaii's male inmate population.

==== Jails ====
Hawaii is one of six states in the United States that operates its jails at the state level. In most states jails are the responsibility of county and county-equivalent governments. The Hawaii Department of Public Safety is responsible for four jails: one on each of the islands of Oahu, Hawaii, Maui and Kauai.

=== Law Enforcement Division ===
==== Narcotics Enforcement Division ====
The Narcotics Enforcement Division (NED) serves and protects the public by enforcing laws relating to controlled substances and regulated chemicals. They are responsible for the registration and control of the manufacture, distribution, prescription, and dispensing of controlled substances and precursor or essential chemicals within the state.

==== Sheriff Division ====
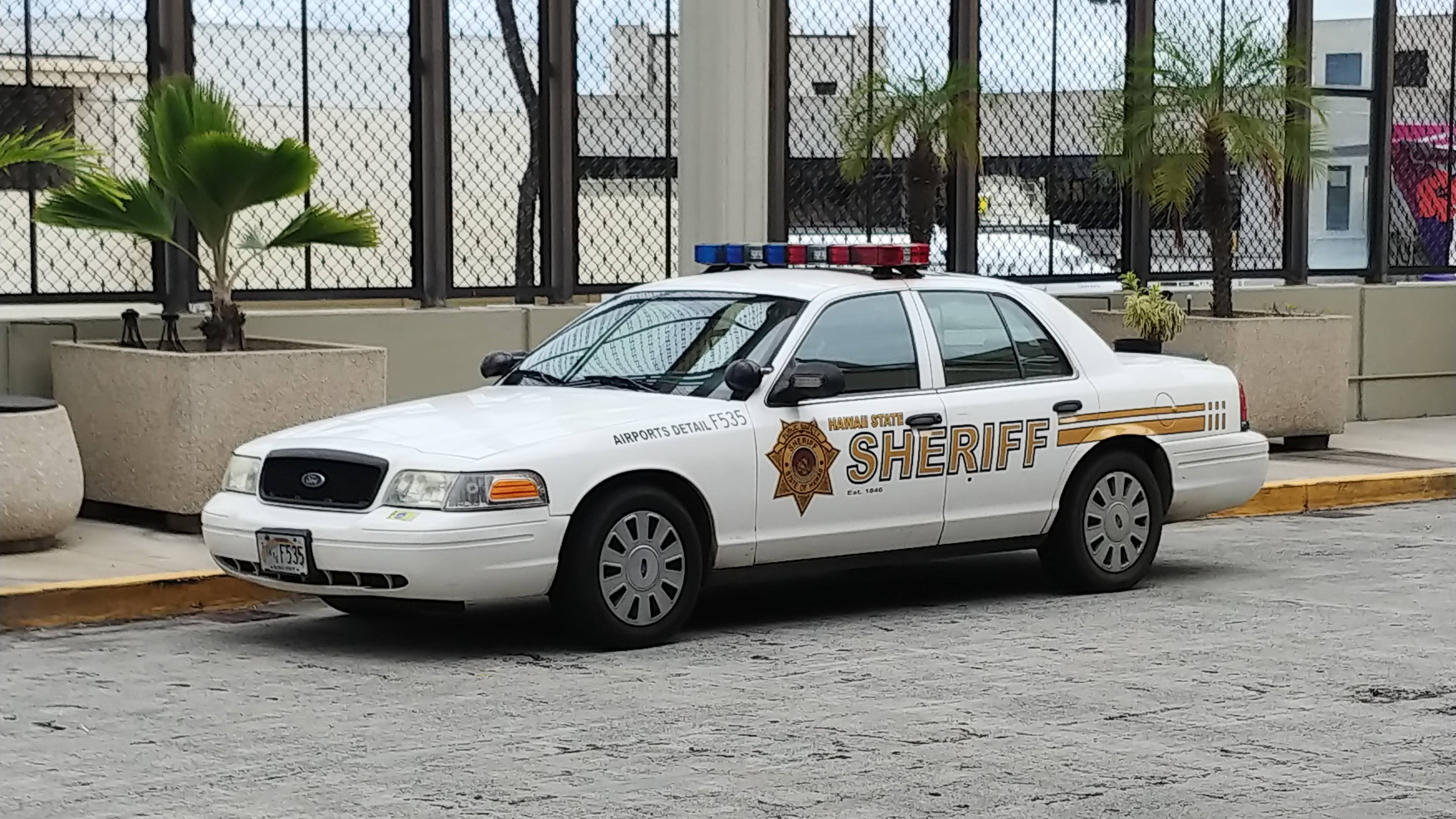
Hawaii State Sheriff Division Ford Crown Victoria Police Interceptor

The Sheriff Division carries out law enforcement services statewide. Its mission is to preserve the peace by protecting all persons and property within premises under the control of the judiciary and all state facilities; providing process services and execution of court documents; handling detained persons; and providing secure transportation for persons in custody. It also provides law enforcement services at the Daniel K. Inouye International Airport. They also serve various types of arrest warrants and other documents, and execute writs of possession. Deputy sheriffs conduct criminal and civil investigations on cases that occur within the jurisdiction of state entities. They also conduct records verification and background checks. Additionally, through its specialized canine unit, the division is responsible for detecting narcotics and explosives in agencies within the judiciary, the department's correctional facilities, and other state and county agencies that request those services.

Sheriffs provide security police services to the Maui Memorial Hospital, Hawaii State Hospital, Waimano Training School and Hospital, and Fort Ruger at the Department of Defense. They also provide executive protection services to the governor, lieutenant governor and, when requested, national and international dignitaries.

== Fallen officers ==
Since the establishment of the Hawaii Department of Public Safety, two officers have been killed.

== Controversies ==
In April 2016, Hawaii news media outlet Hawaii News Now reported that fifteen deputy sheriffs employed by the department, including some high-ranking officials within the division, had not yet received basic law enforcement training, despite some of them having been employed as sheriffs for more than two decades. According to the report, sources indicated that the lack of training "had led to some cases getting 'fouled up.'"

On April 11, 2019, Hawaii News Now reported that Department of Public Safety administrator Joveta Marte Martinez had repeatedly lied about receiving degrees from Southern Oregon State College (now called Southern Oregon University) and Saint Joseph's College of Maine.

== See also ==
- Police
- Law enforcement
- List of law enforcement agencies in Hawaii
- List of United States state correction agencies
- Traffic police
- Highway patrol
- State police
- State patrol
- Hawaii Five-O
