= Hawaii Department of Corrections and Rehabilitation =

American law enforcement agency

Hawaii Department of Corrections and Rehabilitation Ka ʻOihana Hoʻomalu Kalaima a Hoʻoponopono Ola (Hawaiian)
- Seal of Hawaii
- Abbreviation: DCR
- Motto: He Au Hou ("a new era")

Agency overview
- Formed: January 1, 2024
- Preceding agency: Hawaii Department of Public Safety

Jurisdictional structure
- Operations jurisdiction: Hawaii, U.S.
- Map of Hawaii Department of Corrections and Rehabilitation's jurisdiction
- Area: 10,931 square miles (28,310 km^{2})
- Population: 1,455,271 (2020 census)
- General nature: Civilian police

Operational structure
- Headquarters: Honolulu, Hawaii
- Agency executives: Tommy Johnson, Director; Melanie Martin, Deputy Director of Administration; VACANT, Deputy Director of Corrections; Sanna Muñoz, Deputy Director for Rehabilitation Services and Programs

Website
- dcr.hawaii.gov

The Hawaii Department of Corrections and Rehabilitation (DCR) is a department within the executive branch of the government of the U.S. state of Hawaii. The mission of the Department of Corrections and Rehabilitation is "to provide a secure correctional environment for comprehensive rehabilitative, holistic, and wraparound re-entry services to persons sentenced to our custody and care with professionalism, integrity, respect, and fairness."

== History and establishment ==
Prior to 2024, the department was called as the Hawaii Department of Public Safety and it managed Hawaii's jails and prisons as well as some of the state's law enforcement functions, including the Hawaii State Sheriff. Beginning on January 1, 2024, as directed by Act 278, which was passed by the Hawaii State Legislature in 2022, those law enforcement functions were moved into a separate Department of Law Enforcement, while the Department of Public Safety retained the corrections functions and was renamed as the Department of Corrections and Rehabilitation. According to the Act 278, the Legislature believed that the reorganization would "allow the efficient use of resources in administering correctional programs and administering and maintaining public and private correctional services."

== Organization ==
The Department of Corrections and Rehabilitation has the following divisions: Office of the Director, Administration, Corrections, and Rehabilitation Services and Programs.

=== Office of the Director ===
- The Civil Rights Compliance Office is responsible for ensuring the department's compliance with applicable federal and state civil rights laws, regulations, directives, and executive orders.
- The Internal Affairs Office (IAO) is responsible for conducting internal investigations of department employees.
- The Inspections and Investigations Office (IIO) works to ensure the department's programs are operated safely, humanely, and lawfully.

=== Administration Division ===
This division provides administrative support to the department. It comprises the fiscal office, human resources office, and training and staff development.

=== Corrections Division ===
The Corrections Division comprises the following units:

- The Inmate Classification Office (ICO) is responsible for custody designations and the placement of inmates in correctional institutions.
- The Correctional Industries (CI) Division manages vocational rehabilitation programs designed to provide work experience and skills training for inmates.
- The Corrections Program Services (CPS) manages educational, nutritional, religious, and substance abuse and sex offender treatment programs.
- The Health Care Division (HCD) maintains health care programs at correctional facilities.
- The Intake Service Centers Division (ISCD) provides pretrial evaluations, assessments, and supervision and oversees jail and prison diversion programs in coordination with the Hawaii State Judiciary and the Hawaii Department of Health.
- The Offender Management Office (OMO) oversees sentence computation in coordination with the Hawaii State Judiciary and law enforcement agencies.

==== Institutions Division ====
===== Jails =====
The division oversees four jails, which house pretrial inmates, short-term misdemeanants, and felony offenders who have almost completed their sentences:

- Hawaii Community Correctional Center in the County of Hawaii
- Kauai Community Correctional Center in the County of Kauai
- Maui Community Correctional Center in the County of Maui
- Oahu Community Correctional Center in the City and County of Honolulu

===== Prisons =====
The division is also responsible for overseeing four prisons:

- Halawa Correctional Facility
- Waiawa Correctional Facility
- Kulani Correctional Facility
- Women's Community Correctional Center

Kulani Correctional Facility is located on the Big Island of Hawaii, while the remaining three prisons are located on the island of Oahu.

===== Private prisons =====
In 1995 the State of Hawaii began contracting with prisons outside of Hawaii to house prisoners from Hawaii. The criteria for sending inmates to private prisons on the mainland include a minimum sentence of 24 months, a lack of pending criminal cases in Hawaii, and a lack of major health and medical issues. Attorney Daphne Barbee said that she had clients with cases pending who were sent to the mainland anyway. According to Kevin Dayton of the Honolulu Advertiser, some inmates prefer to stay on the mainland for superior educational programs, drug treatment programs, and other programs that a prisoner would complete before he or she is considered for parole. Other prisoners, particularly those with young children and families, prefer to stay in Hawaii.

The Mainland Section initially contracted with three facilities, one in Kentucky and two in Arizona, to house prisoners sentenced in Hawaii.

The Kentucky prison, Otter Creek Correctional Center, was a designated women's prison run by Corrections Corporation of America. After numerous reports of prison staff sexually abusing inmates, Hawaii brought its prisoners home from the facility in August 2009. CCA closed the facility in 2013.

The state also removed its prisoners from CCA's Red Rock Correctional Center in Arizona in 2014.

About 1,900 male Hawaii state inmates are held at CCA's Saguaro Correctional Center in Eloy, Arizona. This represents the majority of Hawaii's male inmate population.

=== Rehabilitation Services and Programs Division ===
The Rehabilitation Services and Programs Division provides education, job training, and furlough programs and resources to inmates.

=== Attached agencies ===
- Hawaii Paroling Authority
- Hawaii Correctional Industries
- Crime Victim Compensation Commission, provides compensation to victims of violent crimes for their crime-related injuries and losses, and to “Good Samaritans” for injuries or property damage suffered in the prevention of a crime or apprehension of a criminal.

== See also ==
- List of law enforcement agencies in Hawaii
- List of United States state correction agencies
