= Mossy Cade =

American football player (born 1961)

No. 3, 24
- Position: Safety

Personal information
- Born: December 26, 1961 (age 64); Eloy, Arizona, U.S.
- Listed height: 6 ft 1 in (1.85 m)
- Listed weight: 195 lb (88 kg)

Career information
- High school: Santa Cruz Valley Union (Eloy, Arizona)
- College: Texas
- NFL draft: 1984: 1st round, 6 (By the San Diego Chargers)th overall pick

Career history
- San Diego Chargers (1984)*; Memphis Showboats (1985); Green Bay Packers (1985–1986); Minnesota Vikings (1988)
- * Offseason or practice squad member only

Awards and highlights
- First-team All-American (1983); First-team All-SWC (1983); Second-team All-SWC (1982)

Career NFL statistics
- Interceptions: 5
- Fumble recoveries: 1
- Sacks: 1
- Stats at Pro Football Reference

Tommories "Mossy" S. Cade (born December 26, 1961) is an American former professional football player who was a safety first for the Memphis Showboats of the United States Football League (USFL) in 1985 and then for two seasons from 1985 to 1986 for the Green Bay Packers of the National Football League (NFL). Prior to that he was an All-American for the Texas Longhorns and then was selected by the San Diego Chargers in the first round of the 1984 NFL draft with the sixth overall pick.

Cade was born and raised in Eloy, AZ where he helped Eloy Santa Cruz win the 1979 State Championship in football, scoring both of the team's touchdowns and helping to hold Ray High School to just 42 yards total offense. He was an all-state running back and played safety. He also set the national high school record in the 110 high hurdles at 13.69 seconds, which remained an Arizona state record until 2013.

== College career ==
Cade played four years of college football, where he was an All-American in his senior year. He played in every game in his four years and recorded 11 interceptions (5th best at the time and 10th best as of 2024). In 1980, he helped the team to the 1980 Astro-Bluebonnet Bowl which they lost to North Carolina. In 1981 he helped the team go 10-1-1, make it as high as #1 in the rankings and upset Alabama in the 1982 Cotton Bowl Classic, finishing #2 in the rankings. In 1982 he was a 2nd Team All Southwest Conference selection and the team lost the 1982 Sun Bowl, again to North Carolina. In his senior year, he was a first team All-American and first team All-SWC safety as the team won the Southwest Conference Championship and, after spending almost the whole season ranked #2, missed out on the National Championship after a 1-point upset loss to Georgia. The 1983 defense, which also featured All-American Jerry Gray is often considered one of the best defenses in Texas history.

He played in the 35th annual Senior Bowl.

At Texas he also ran track during his freshman and senior years. He set the school record (since broken) for the 55-meter/60-yard hurdles at the 1981 SWC Championship and finished 5th in the 110-hurdles at the same event.

== Professional career ==
Despite being selected by the San Diego Chargers as the #6 overall pick, Cade was unhappy with the contract they offered and sat the season out. In February he signed the Memphis Showboats, playing one season before the league folded. He played in 15 games that year, and recorded 2 interceptions.

In the summer of 1985, Cade and the Chargers again tried to negotiate a contract, but again they were unable to. The Chargers traded Cade to the Green Bay Packers for two draft choices, including a first round pick in 1986, which the Chargers then traded to the Minnesota Vikings who used it to select Gerald Robinson.

The night after his first start with the Packers, on Nov 4, 1985, Cade allegedly came home and sexually assaulted an aunt (by marriage, his uncle's estranged wife). While the case worked its way through the courts, Cade continued to play for the Packers.

Cade was convicted in 1987 of two counts of second degree sexual assault and was acquitted of a third count and later sentenced to 2 years in prison. He was paroled in October of 1988 after serving 15 months in Fox Lake Correctional Institution.

After his conviction, the woman he was found guilty of raping filed a $2 million civil lawsuit against him. He was also later accused of perjury because his testimony during the trial differed with that during the sentencing hearing. That charge was dropped shortly before he was released.

Upon release, he was waived by the Packers and then signed by the Minnesota Vikings who then released him after just three days due to public outcry over his signing. The NFL had already said that he would not be reinstated in 1988 and then said the same in 1989, further implying that he would never be allowed to play as long as Pete Rozelle was commissioner. Even when Paul Tagliabue replaced Rozelle, Cade was treated as though he were banned from football and his attempts to get reinstated were ignored. He was also unable to get work in the CFL or WLAF, because of the difficulties of getting a work visa with his criminal past.

He finished his career having played in 30 games, with 19 starts, 1 fumble recovery and 5 interceptions for 26 yards.

== Personal life ==
His brother Mike played with him on the 1979 state championship team and then went to star at Arizona State, but also got into trouble with the law for armed bank robbery. His cousin Eddie Cade played a season with the New England patriots.

After his playing career ended, Cade married Kim Wright and they had a son. He worked several jobs and took computer classes at night.

== See also ==
- List of Texas Longhorns football All-Americans
- List of Los Angeles Chargers first-round draft picks
