= Eugene Barrett =

American serial killer (1931–2003)

- Barrett in 1959
- Born: Eugene Walter Barrett; June 30, 1931; Oakland, California, U.S.
- Died: November 8, 2003 (aged 72); Pali Momi Medical Center, Waimalu, Hawaii, U.S.
- Other name: "Gene"
- Convictions: Second degree murder (2 counts); Manslaughter
- Penalty: Life imprisonment with the possibility of parole after 40 years (Kastner); Life imprisonment; commuted to 15-to-50 years (Phillips); 10 years (Aveira)

Details
- Victims: 3
- Span of crimes: 1959–1995
- Country: United States
- State: Hawaii
- Date apprehended: August 12, 1995

Eugene Walter Barrett (June 30, 1931 – November 8, 2003) was an American serial killer who murdered three women he was romantically involved with in Honolulu, Hawaii from 1959 to 1995. He was sentenced to life imprisonment for the final murder and died in prison in 2003. He was the first confirmed and one of only three known serial killers active in the state, the others being the unidentified Honolulu Strangler and the Kauai serial killer.

== Early life ==
Eugene Walter Barrett was born on June 30, 1931, in Oakland, California, the older of two sons born to Howard and Emily Barrett (née Amorin). Little is known about his childhood, other than the fact that he studied at the Washington Intermediate School in Honolulu until he dropped out in the ninth grade. He later joined the Army and fought in the Korean War, but was dishonorably discharged in 1955 due to his excessive drinking.

== Murders ==
At some point after his discharge, he returned to Honolulu, where he began a romantic relationship with a woman named Annie E. Phillips, a divorced mother of five children. Barrett, a house painter by profession, was unemployed and drank excessively, eventually leading to Phillips severing ties with him in 1959. Unable to handle her rejection, the enraged Barrett decided that he would kill his ex-girlfriend. He armed himself with a gun, got on a bus to her apartment complex in Mayor Wright Homes and forced his way inside. Barrett then walked across the living room, where two of Phillips' children were watching TV, and went into the bedroom, where he found her tending to her youngest child. Before she had time to react, he pulled out his gun and shot her multiple times, killing her on the spot. The ensuing racket alerted the neighbors, who managed to hold down and beat him until police forces could arrive.

At his subsequent trial, Barrett claimed that he could not recall the shooting, as he was drunk at the time. This was contradicted by witnesses, who claimed that he said that she "deserved it". Due to the overwhelming evidence against him, Barrett was found guilty, convicted and sentenced to life imprisonment. This was later reduced to a 15-to-50 years imprisonment, and in 1967, he was paroled after then-Governor John A. Burns commuted his minimum imprisonment term to 8 years for unknown reasons. Barrett then returned to Honolulu, where he married Roberta Ululani Aveiro in February 1971. Their marriage was short-lived, as she filed for divorce in November 1972, citing her husband's excessive drinking as the primary factor for this action. A month later, on December 27, he went to the Hawaii Hotel, where his ex-wife was staying at the time, and stabbed her multiple times with a kitchen knife. After his arrest, he waived his right to trial and pleaded guilty to a reduced charge of manslaughter. He was sentenced to 10 years imprisonment, was paroled in 1976 and his parole requirements were dismissed in 1982.

For the remainder of the 1980s, Barrett resided in an apartment complex on Kinau Street in relative peace, but continued to drink and exhibit unstable emotional behavior. Across from his apartment lived his neighbor, 41-year-old Doneshia "RoxAnne" Kastner, who had a checkered history of both substance and sexual abuse. Despite this, she was allowed to look after her 7-year-old son Ethan, whom she often took kayaking. While there was no confirmed intimate relationship between the pair, Barrett privately accused Kastner of mocking him by dating other men and supposedly indecently exposing herself in front of him. Friends and acquaintances even claimed that he would sometimes call them on the phone, hysterically claiming that he was afraid he was going to "harm" her. After one such bout, he voluntarily asked to be admitted for psychiatric treatment at The Queen's Medical Center, where he remained until early August 1995. By the time of his release, Kastner had moved to a neighboring apartment across the street, which had angered Barrett, who believed that she would move away from the neighborhood altogether.

On August 11, 1995, just a few days after his release, Barrett spent most of the day drinking beer with his brother and a friend. After he went to get more at the local store, he saw Kastner entering her apartment. On a whim, he went back to his apartment, got a .25 semiautomatic pistol and went across the street, going right by her son, who was playing in front of the building. Barrett then went inside Kastner's room, and when she turned to face him, he shot her twice in the head and then left the room. He was seen leaving by Kastner's son, who immediately called his father, who in turn called the authorities. Kastner was driven to the Queen's Medical Center, but succumbed to her injuries later that same day.

== Arrest, trial and imprisonment ==
Police examining the crime scene located the supposed murder weapon, which was reported as stolen back in 1989, dumped near the apartment complex. However, there was no sign of Barrett, for whom an arrest warrant was issued. The following day, Barrett entered the Columbia Inn and pleaded with the manager to call the police so he could surrender peacefully. The man complied with his request, and shortly afterwards, Barrett was arrested and lodged in a detention facility without incident. He was held on $120,000 bail and charged with murder, theft and unlawful possession of a firearm, to which he pleaded not guilty. Barrett's third murder charge sparked controversy, leading the chief of the Hawaii Paroling Authority, Claudio Suyat, to release a statement claiming a repeat offender with the accused man's record would never be paroled with contemporary laws.

At the preliminary hearings, Kastner's son, Ethan, was called in to testify against Barrett, making him one of the youngest witnesses to take the stand in the state's history. The boy claimed that he had seen "Gene" (as he called him) leave the room mere minutes after he found his mother's body - this account was corroborated by a neighbor of the Kastners, Enrique Crisostomo, who claimed that he had heard the boy crying after two or three gunshots had been fired into the neighboring apartment. In the meantime, Barrett announced through his attorney that he wished to remain incarcerated until he could deal with his "problem". This claim was partially granted when the judge revoked his bail, leading to him being imprisoned until his trial would take place.

At the trial itself, Barrett's attorney reiterated that his client's actions were the result of Kastner's perceived mistreatment of him, which eventually led to him snapping and killing her in a fit of rage. Barrett himself claimed that this was the cause, as he said that he "wanted to kill the bitch" for constantly "choosing all [the] other guys over [him]." This did not succeed in swaying the jury, who found him guilty on all counts, resulting in an automatic life sentence. The presiding Justice, Wendell K. Hubby, also imposed a requirement to serve at least 40 years before he could be eligible for parole, making it a de facto life term without parole. The sentence was commended by prosecutor Fred Titcomb, who also stated that his original life sentence should have never been commuted, and that if his daughter had been killed, he would have sued the state for damages.

== Death ==
After his sentencing, Barrett was transferred to an out-of-state facility in Oklahoma, where he spent the majority of his prison sentence. He was occasionally contacted by his son's wife, who sent him photos of his grandsons, as his son resented him too much to do it himself. In 2003, Barrett was returned to Hawaii and lodged in the Halawa Correctional Facility, but fell ill and was transferred to the Pali Momi Medical Center in Waimalu, where he died from an undisclosed illness on November 8.

== See also ==
- Kauai serial killer
- Honolulu Strangler
- List of serial killers in the United States
