= Kirk Lankford =

American murderer

- Born: 1985 (age 40–41)
- Status: Incarcerated at Saguaro Correctional Center
- Conviction: Second-degree murder
- Penalty: Life Imprisonment

Details
- Imprisoned at: Saguaro Correctional Center

Kirk Matthew Lankford (born 1985) is an American man originally from Colorado who was living in Kalihi, Hawaii, and was convicted of murdering a Japanese tourist in Pūpūkea, Hawaii.

On April 12, 2007, Japanese tourist Masumi Watanabe disappeared in Pūpūkea. Lankford was arrested and charged with second-degree murder on April 26, 2007, after police found blood and items belonging to Watanabe in his pickup truck. Watanabe's body was never found, but the blood in Lankford's truck was determined to have been Watanabe's.

Lankford denied any involvement in her disappearance and maintained there was a police conspiracy against him. After failing a polygraph exam, he admitted to being involved in her disappearance.

At his trial, Lankford pleaded not guilty. In his trial testimony, Lankford claimed that he had accidentally hit Watanabe with his truck, but that she had not been seriously injured and he offered to give her a ride to her destination. Lankford claims that after he began driving with Watanabe in the truck, she jumped out of the moving vehicle and hit her head on a rock by the road. When Lankford discovered that she had died, he says, he disposed of her body in the ocean because he said he was frightened that he would lose his job. Prior to his trial, Lankford had told police he had never seen Watanabe before.

The jury found Lankford guilty of second-degree murder. At his sentencing hearing, Circuit Judge Karl Sakamoto referred to Lankford as a "predator" and sentenced him to life imprisonment. Peter Carlisle, the city prosecutor, asked the parole board for 120-years minimum imprisonment. He is currently serving his sentence at Saguaro Correctional Center in Eloy, Arizona.
