= William E. Woods =

American gay rights activist (1949–2008)

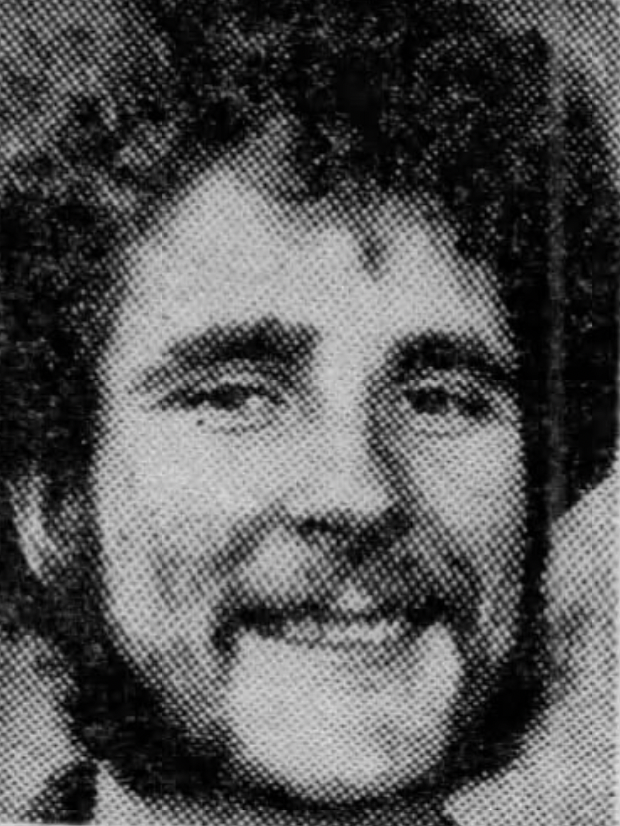
- Woods in 1974
- Born: William Everett Woods; October 9, 1949; Decatur, Illinois, US
- Died: September 28, 2008 (aged 58); Honolulu, Hawaii, US
- Education: University of Hawaiʻi
- Occupation: Gay rights activist
- Years active: 1972–2008
- Political party: Democratic
- Spouse: Lance W. Bateman

William Everett Woods (October 9, 1949 – September 28, 2008) was an American gay rights activist. He advocated for better treatment of gay people through his political organizing and public commentary. In 1990, he took three same-sex couples to fill out marriage licenses, one of a series of events that eventually culminated in the legalization of same-sex marriage in the United States.

Woods was born in Decatur, Illinois, and attended Millikin University before transferring to the University of Hawaiʻi. Upon graduating in 1971, he secured a job in the Hawaii Department of Health before founding a social services organization for gay people called the Sexual Identity Center. The organization held panels on gay issues and organized petition campaigns; in his capacity as executive director, Woods critiqued media treatment of homosexuals and advocated for their civil rights. He mounted an unsuccessful campaign for a seat in the Hawaii Senate in 1974, the first of many failed attempts to be elected to a state-level political position. With three other delegates, he represented Hawaii on the steering committee for the 1979 National March on Washington for Lesbian and Gay Rights.

In 1980, Woods unsuccessfully sought a seat on the Hawaii Board of Education. The following year he led a group in disrupting Jerry Falwell's visit to Hawaii by registering an organization called "Moral Majority of Hawaii". After another unsuccessful campaign for the Board of Education in 1984, Woods was named to the Mayor's Advisory Committee on AIDS in 1985, and also served as president of a University of Hawaiʻi alumni group from 1985 to 1987. By 1990 he was directing and managing the Gay Community News, resulting in his election to the national board of the Gay and Lesbian Press Association.

In 1990, Woods brought three same-sex couples to the Hawaii Department of Health's main office in Honolulu to fill out marriage licenses. When the licenses were not issued, the couples filed a lawsuit with Woods's support, initiating Baehr v. Miike, an important case in the development of legal same-sex marriage in the United States. He continued his advocacy on gay issues for the rest of his life, founding the Gay and Lesbian Education and Advocacy Foundation in 1990 and mounting an unsuccessful campaign to be Governor of Hawaii in 1994. Woods himself traveled to Vancouver to marry another man in 2003; he died in September 2008 after a long illness.

== Early life and education ==
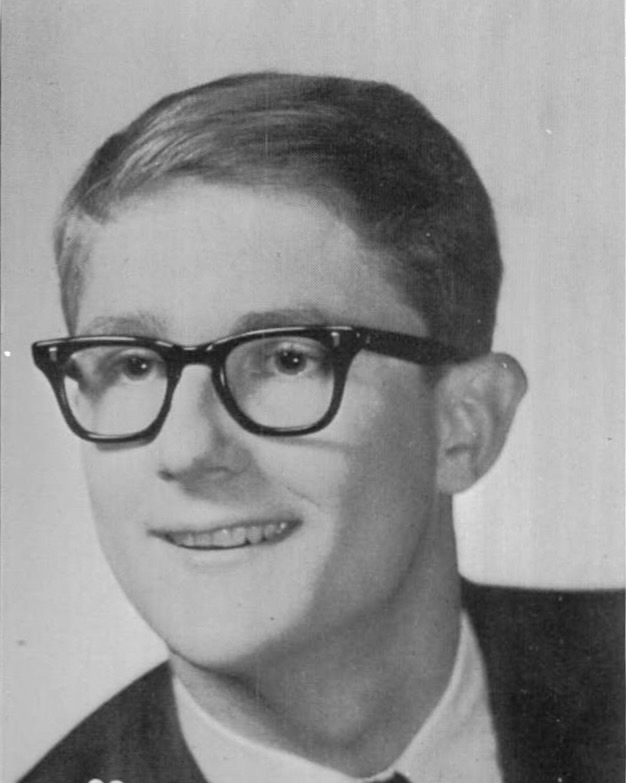
Woods as pictured in his 1967 high school yearbook

William Everett Woods was born on October 9, 1949, in Decatur, Illinois. He attended high school in Arthur, Illinois, before attending Millikin University, from which he transferred in 1969 to attend the University of Hawaiʻi (UH). At UH, Woods earned a Bachelor of Arts in psychology, graduating in 1971; he later received a master's degree in public health from the university.

== Career ==
=== Love and Peace Together (1970s) ===
After graduating from UH, Woods worked at the Hawaii State Hospital before securing a job as a research statistician for the Hawaii Department of Health, which stationed him at the Kalihi-Palama Mental Health Center. In 1972, he founded a social services organization called the Sexual Identity Center; it was intended to serve gay people specifically, but the name did not contain a reference to homosexuality because he did not want to deter straight experts from being involved. Located in Pauoa Valley, the center was operated by a nonprofit called Love and Peace Together, which was also founded by Woods. He continued his work for the health department while running the new organization.

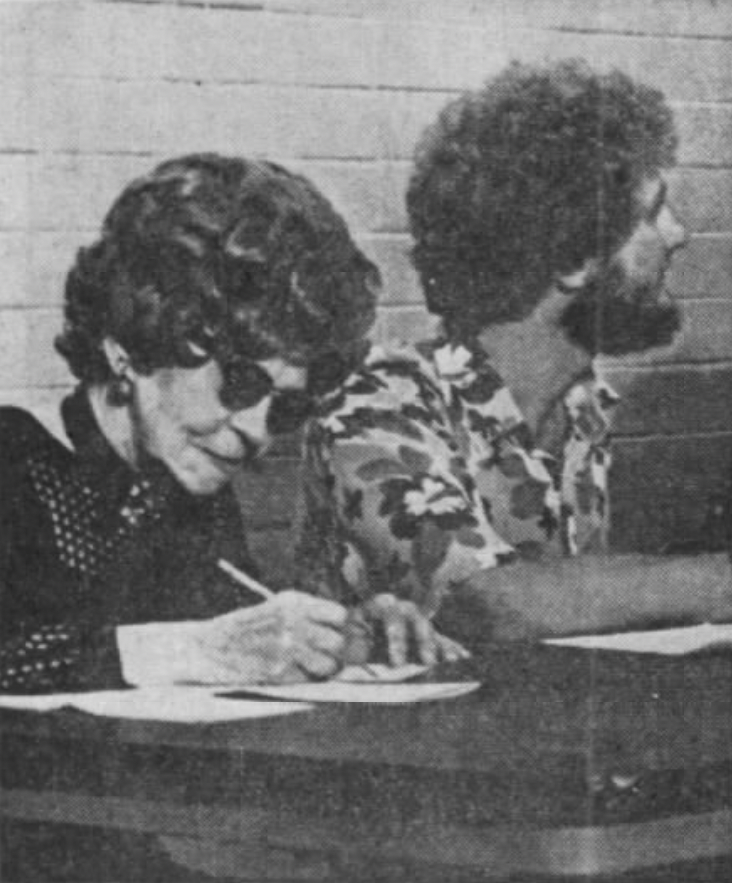
Woods (right) moderating a 1974 panel about sex in Hawaii state prisons

In 1974, Woods was present at Hawaii's first pride parade. The same year, his nonprofit Love and Peace Together organized a panel discussion about sex at Hawaii state prisons, titled "Sexuality and the Prison", which was the first in a series of twelve programs put on by the organization with a focus on "Sexuality at Work"; Woods served as moderator of the discussion. Also in 1974, he wrote a letter to the editor of the Honolulu Star-Bulletin in his capacity as director of the Sexual Identity Center, criticizing an article about Windward Community College that included "homosexuals" in a list of "misfits" that also included prostitutes, alcoholics, and people addicted to drugs.

In July 1974, Woods announced a campaign for Hawaii Senate, running for a seat in the fifth district (west Honolulu). He was one of eight Democrats campaigning for the four available seats in the district. Woods campaigned on a platform of increased regulation for social service organizations, better controls on the conduct of government officials, and stricter rules for expenditure of public funds. He called for legalization of marijuana in Hawaii, describing the amount of government resources expended on marijuana-related prosecutions as "appalling" and arguing that legalization would free up that money to be put toward more important causes. He additionally expressed an intent to grant civil rights "to those still discriminated against"; The Honolulu Advertiser noted his status as a member of Gay Liberation Hawaii and the Hawaii Council of Gay Organizations along with Pauoa Community Association and the Metropolitan Community Church. At the time, Woods described his campaign as "very low key", and stated that he was seeking the support of groups rather than canvassing because of a lack of funding. The campaign was unsuccessful.

Love and Peace Together initiated a petition campaign in early 1975 to set aside a portion of Diamond Head Beach Park as a nude beach. Woods noted that the only existing option for nude swimmers was a private naturist camp, which cost money to enter, and stated that nude sunbathers had previously been arrested for "lewd and lascivious conduct, which is a totally interpretive judgement by the police". The petitions gathered nearly 1,000 signatures. In March 1975, a committee of the Hawaii House of Representatives recommended revising the state's indecent exposure laws to include any exposure of genitalia in a public space where it was likely to offend others; Woods criticized the proposal, arguing that it was "ludicrous that anyone feels so ashamed of one's own body that nudity becomes offensive".

In July 1977, the Sexual Identity Center hosted a presentation by two members of the National Association of Evangelicals, who were invited to present their views on homosexuality in a panel moderated by Woods. A front-page article in the Star-Bulletin noted the evangelicals' assertions that homosexuality was abnormal and sinful, and that gay people could be converted to heterosexuality, as well as the respectful and skeptical responses of the gay people present. The following month, the Star-Bulletin published an article written by Woods in which he agreed that "homosexuals are made, not born" and that "individuals who desire, may change to heterosexual activities". Woods argued against typical criticisms of homosexuality and stated that because homosexuality was legal, "society has the same obligation to the gay offender as the straight". He concluded that the responsibility of all minorities was "to present themselves to the world as responsible individuals seeking to preserve the dignity of 'mankind'" while defending "their individual right to live their chosen lifestyle without oppression". In October 1977, another panel at the Sexual Identity Center hosted an officer from the vice squad of the Honolulu Police Department; Woods expressed a desire to help gay people better understand the function of the squad and improve their relations with police.

After a history teacher at Kalani High School stated that he would support shooting all gay people in October 1978, Woods called a press conference in his capacity as director of the Sexual Identity Center and demanded that the teacher be reprimanded. In 1979, Woods was one of Hawaii's four representatives on the steering committee for the National March on Washington for Lesbian and Gay Rights. He was 29 years old at the time. The four delegates were elected from a list of 41 people; of the four, three including Woods were openly gay. A contingent of ten people from Hawaii, including Woods and the other delegates, travelled to the march and were among its 25,000 participants. They held signs with slogans including "Hawaii Supports Gay Rights" and met with Hawaii's congressional delegation after the march.

=== Further activism (1980s) ===
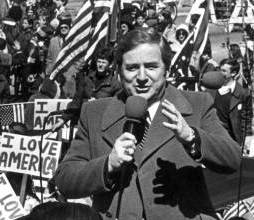
Jerry Falwell's visit to Hawaii was disrupted by Woods's organizing

Woods announced a campaign for an Oahu at-large seat on the Hawaii Board of Education in 1980. At the time he was vice president of the Volunteer, Information and Referral Service (a suicide and crisis support center) in addition to his position as executive director of the Sexual Identity Center. He campaigned with the theme "Education Is for Everyone", aiming to increase literacy and promote equity in curriculum. He additionally expressed support for increased sex education in schools and improved cooperation between the Board and the state legislature. The campaign was unsuccessful.

In May 1981, when Jerry Falwell came to Hawaii to open a state chapter of Moral Majority, Woods led a group to register the name before Falwell could. The resulting organization, Moral Majority of Hawaii, ran newspaper advertisements proclaiming support for "family planning, civil rights for all people, pro-choice in abortion, child care programs, freedom of speech and religion, and the separation of church and state." The group sued Falwell in the Hawaii state circuit court to restrain him from using the name "Moral Majority", causing speaking venues he had reserved to cancel his appearances. Falwell described Moral Majority of Hawaii as "illegal" and stated that he "would prefer not to have a moral majority run by homosexuals". He returned to Virginia after delivering a farewell speech in which it was noted that the only two names mentioned were those of Jesus Christ and William Woods. Moral Majority of Hawaii voluntarily cancelled its trademark registration the following month, with Woods stating that the organization had achieved its goal of demonstrating "that Falwell and his Moral Majority was not moral and not a majority".

Woods hosted a talk show in the early 1980s called Lambda Line. Broadcast by KIOE, the radio show focused on gay issues. In response to a petition by conservative Christians including the Moral Majority and the Christian Coalition to cancel the show in June 1981, Woods stated that Lambda Line was the only radio program in Hawaii that presented "the many diverse and realistic perspectives of gay people", and the Sexual Identity Center announced plans for a counter-petition in support of the show. The American Civil Liberties Union of Hawaii (ACLU of Hawaii) and the Social Concerns Committee of the Hawaii Council of Churches both publicly expressed support for the continued broadcast of Lambda Line, with the ACLU stating that "the goal of private groups [...] to gain control over what we all can see, hear, and read is a frightening prospect – and in a free society, a repugnant one".

After Hawaii's superintendent was fired and asserted that the firing was motivated by her refusal to include an anti-abortion film in the public school curriculum, the film was shown at a meeting of the Hawaii Board of Education in June 1984. While about 15 of the 30-odd attendees spoke in support of the film's inclusion in the curriculum, Woods was the only dissenter, describing it as unhealthy and anti-American. He commended the former superintendent for her decision to reject it. By September 1984, Woods had again filed to campaign for a seat on the Board of Education, his third political campaign and his second for this particular position. Woods received over 32,000 votes, placing near the top of the list of candidates but failing to secure a seat.

In November 1985, Woods was named to the Mayor's Advisory Committee on AIDS, established by then-mayor Frank Fasi. The following month he wrote a letter to the Advertiser praising a recent article for its candid discussion of safe sex practices which could serve to prevent the disease. In the letter he also encouraged readers to look beyond the "rhetoric" of politicians who he stated were promoting a "homosexual eradication program" through their responses to AIDS. In August 1986, the Advisory Committee published a set of recommendations which were distributed within the state legislature and nationally. From 1985 to 1987, Woods also served as president of the University of Hawaii School of Public Health alumni group.

After the Supreme Court of the United States' decision in Bowers v. Hardwick in June 1986, Woods wrote a letter to the editor of the Star-Bulletin condemning the court's choice to allow "a state to impose unreasonable religious standards upon the private lives of American citizens". He mentioned the establishment earlier in 1986 of Hawaii Democrats for Lesbian and Gay Rights, of which he was a member, stating the group's intent to "promote laws that guarantee the right of privacy and other rights that true liberty must provide to all citizens of the United States".

In May 1990, Woods was elected to the national board of the Gay and Lesbian Press Association. At the time, he was executive director and general manager of the Gay Community News, a newspaper published by the Sexual Identity Center, which had been renamed the Gay Community Center. The newspaper, which developed from the organization's newsletter, had a circulation of 40,000 copies, 23,000 in Hawaii and 17,000 across the rest of the United States.

=== 1990 same-sex marriage attempt ===
On December 17, 1990, Woods brought three same-sex couples to the Hawaii Department of Health's main office in Honolulu to fill out marriage licenses. The couples were Ninia Baehr and Genora Dancel, Patrick Lagon and Joseph Melillo, and Antoinette Pregil and Tammy Rodrigues. Woods planned to take them down the street to the headquarters of the ACLU of Hawaii if they were not successfully able to marry. ACLU lawyers had previously belittled similar plans by Woods, but the media's attention to this attempt forced them to take it seriously. After the three couples were told that their applications would be held until the attorney general could make a ruling, the group went to the ACLU offices at the Blaisdell Hotel, where they filled out applications for legal assistance.

On December 29, attorney general Warren Price supported the health department's decision not to issue the licenses. Woods recruited lawyer Dan Foley, who filed the lawsuit that eventually became Baehr v. Miike. After the Hawaii state circuit court ruled against the lawsuit, it was appealed to the Supreme Court of Hawaii, where Associate Justice Steven Levinson wrote the court's 1993 decision that denying same-sex marriage violated the right to equal protection granted by the state constitution, and therefore that same-sex marriages had to be allowed unless the state could provide a reason why they should not be. In 1996, a state circuit court would rule that the state's subsequent argument that opposite-sex parents were better able to raise children was not compelling, though a 1998 amendment to the state constitution which allowed state lawmakers to define marriage as the union of a man and a woman made the ruling irrelevant.

Journalist Sasha Issenberg later wrote that "Not a single major gay-rights group formally embraced marriage rights for its core constituency until the Hawaii Supreme Court in May 1993 gave unexpected blessing to the cause, the unexpected outcome of the legal process that Bill Woods began". Issenberg described the events of December 17, 1990, as the beginning of "a chain of events" that led to legal same-sex marriage in the United States.

=== Later activity ===
In 1990, Woods founded the Gay and Lesbian Education and Advocacy Foundation (GLEAF). By March 1991, Woods was serving as spokesperson for both the GLEAF and the local Gay Rights Task Force. In that role, he supported the passage of legislation that would prohibit workplace discrimination against gay people. When the law was passed by the state legislature near the end of that month and sent to then-governor John D. Waiheʻe III for his signature, Woods celebrated the passage of what he described as a bill he had been personally supporting since 1973. Mentioned as a "longtime Honolulu gay rights leader" in the Star-Bulletin, he told the newspaper that gay people hoped to also attain anti-discrimination protection in other areas, including housing.

In January 1992, Woods was executive director of the GLEAF. However, by the end of that month he left the organization, having admitted in December 1991 that he used more than $2,200 (equivalent to $5,200 in 2025) of federal funds for improvements at his home after he was entrusted with the funds in his role as treasurer of the Hawaii AIDS Task Group. The Hawaii Organization for Political Empowerment (HOPE), a political action committee focused on gay and lesbian issues, responded with a press release describing Woods as a "self-appointed gay-community spokesperson" who in reality "speaks only for himself", and asserting that in the future HOPE would serve to represent the gay community in Hawaii instead. Woods continued to hold his position as editor and publisher of the Gay Community News; he was no longer associated with the Gay Community Center by the time of the incident.

Woods was indicted on felony charges in July 1992 for allegedly stealing money from the Hawaii AIDS Task Group and using it for both home improvements and personal health insurance. He was charged with conspiracy and theft along with an alleged accomplice, and accused of stealing $3,559 (equivalent to $8,400 in 2025). He pleaded not guilty to the charges, which were dismissed after the death of his alleged accomplice, and by 1994 he had regained his position as executive director of the GLEAF. A trial was held in March 1994 after Woods was charged with theft for his use of Task Group funds to pay for his health insurance, but he was found not guilty.

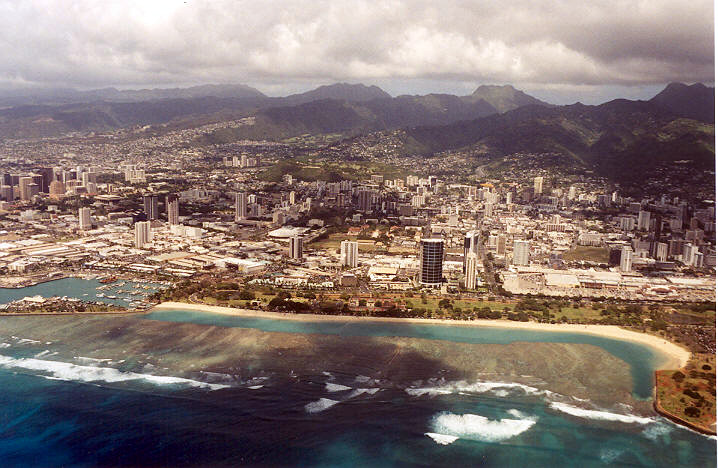
Aerial view of Ala Moana Beach Park in 2004

In June 1994, Woods and Honolulu Weekly writer Marc Thompson visited the Hawaii Department of Health office and attempted to get a marriage license. Upon being told that their license would remain pending until the outcome of Baehr v. Miike became clear, the two men announced that they planned to hold a wedding ceremony anyway, and that they would do so the following day just before the start of the local pride parade. They did so, holding a non-religious ceremony at Ala Moana Beach Park, and subsequently rode at the rear of the parade in a BMW with a sign that read "Just Married".

Woods acquired nomination papers to seek the position of governor of Hawaii as a Best Party of Hawaii candidate in May 1994. He stated that he would campaign on a platform of changing the role of the Attorney General of Hawaii so that the office was no longer entrusted with both enforcing state law and providing legal support to the gubernatorial administration. Suspending publication of Gay Community News to focus on his campaign, he competed against Best Party founder Frank Fasi in the primary election, as well as two other candidates seeking to lead the party ticket. Along with six other gubernatorial candidates, Woods called for inclusion of all candidates in campaign forums rather than just "the four acceptable to the establishment". Woods lost in the primary election, receiving 2 percent of votes to Fasi's 97 percent.

After a consular staff member from the local Australian consulate donated $200 (equivalent to $400 in 2025) to attend a dinner and seminar held by a political action committee opposing gay marriage in 1998, Woods publicly exposed the donation. It was illegal under Hawaii law, which prohibits foreign donations to political campaigns. The money was returned, and Woods called for an investigation, which the state Campaign Spending Commission began in early March. In April, three more complaints by Woods were investigated: he claimed that retail group DFS Hawaii had donated more than the permissible $1,000 to the committee's fundraiser, that a lobbying group's hosting of the event amounted to an illegal amount of non-cash donation, and that author Stephen Covey violated state law by speaking for free at the event when he normally charged $60,000 (equivalent to $118,500 in 2025) for his appearances. In October 1998, Woods criticized "systemic discrimination" against gay people in the legal system, challenging the gay panic defense which had been beneficial to defendants charged with violence against gay people. In May 2003, Woods signed a letter to the editor as chairman of the LGBT caucus of the Democratic Party of Hawaii. He continued to hold his position as executive director of the GLEAF.

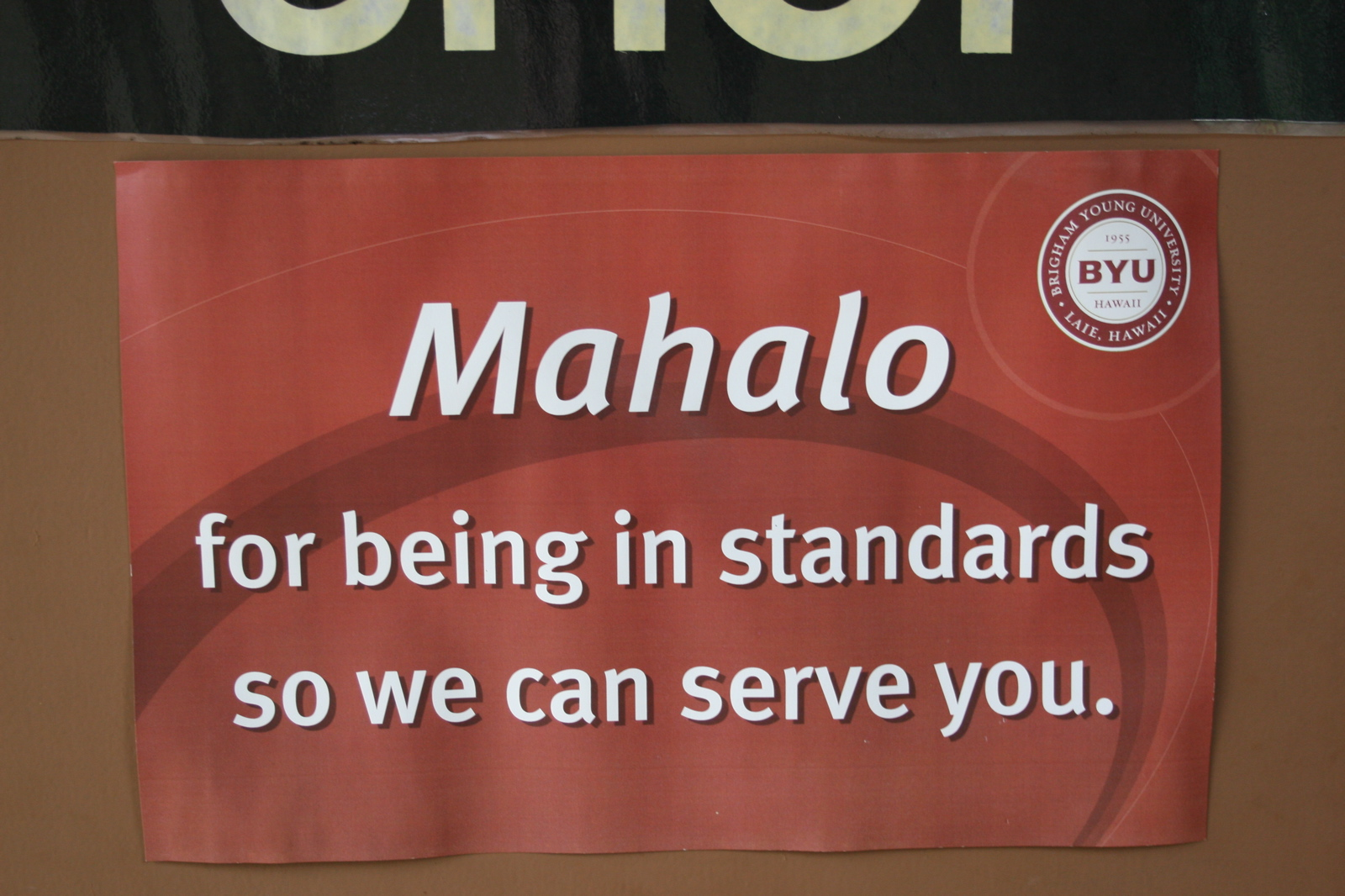
A sign at BYU–Hawaii reminds students of the school's honor code

In February 2004, while the Hawaii legislature was considering a bill allowing same-sex civil unions, Woods described such unions as "unequal, unfair, but a step in the right direction", referring to his hope for eventual legalization of same-sex marriage. After the bill stalled in committee, he described the experience as "painful" but expressed a commitment to focusing on supporting a bill to prohibit housing discrimination on the basis of sexual orientation. The latter bill was delayed after Senator Colleen Hanabusa objected to the inclusion of a provision exempting religious organizations from the proposed statute; the provision had been added after lobbying by Brigham Young University–Hawaii (BYU–Hawaii) and an affiliated business. Woods supported Hanabusa's objection, stating that the provision had been intended to provide "a religious exemption to educational institutions for their students only" but that as worded it would have fully exempted all church properties. The provision was revised the following month to apply only to student housing at BYU–Hawaii, and Woods thanked BYU officials for their cooperation. The bill passed the legislature in April 2004.

Woods unsuccessfully campaigned to represent Kalihi in the Hawaii House of Representatives in 2006. Along with his husband Lance Bateman, he served on the Neighborhood Board for Kalihi Valley, and was chairman of the board for several terms, resigning about three months before his death. He served as district chairman of the Democratic Party of Hawaii and a member of the party's central committee.

== Later life and death ==
On August 31, 2003, Woods married Lance W. Bateman in Vancouver. Bateman, an operations manager, lived with Woods in Honolulu; the two held a reception at the Halekulani hotel in November of that year. Woods changed his name to William Everett Woods-Bateman in 2005. In 2008, he changed his name back to William Everett Woods.

Woods died on September 28, 2008, at the age of 58 after having been ill for a long period. Nancy Kern, the Hawaii Department of Health's STD/AIDS prevention coordinator at the time, remembered him as "a tireless advocate". His obituary in the Star-Bulletin stated that Woods was considered "the father of Hawaii's gay rights movement".
