= Santa Cruz Valley Union High School =

Location
- 900 North Main Street; Eloy, Arizona 85131; United States; 32°45′33.1″N 111°33′22.25″W

Information
- School type: Public high school
- Motto: Think, Learn, Succeed
- School district: Santa Cruz Valley Union High School District
- Superintendent: Orlenda Roberts
- CEEB code: 030100
- Principal: Oranté Jenkins
- Teaching staff: 18.00 (FTE)
- Grades: 9-12
- Enrollment: 384 (2023–2024)
- Student to teacher ratio: 21.33
- Colors: Silver and scarlet
- Mascot: Dust Devils
- Website: www.scvuhs.org/SCVUHS

Santa Cruz Valley Union High School is a high school in Eloy, Arizona. It is the only school under the jurisdiction of the Santa Cruz Valley Union High School District.

== Notable alumni ==
- Eddie Cade - pro football player
- Mossy Cade - All-American football player and 1st Round NFL Draft choice.
- Levi Jones - pro football player, Morris Trophy Winner and 1st Round NFL Draft choice.
- Art Malone and Benny Malone - football players for Arizona State University and in the NFL
