= Levi Jones =

American football player (born 1979)

No. 76
- Position: Offensive tackle

Personal information
- Born: August 24, 1979 (age 47); Eloy, Arizona, U.S.
- Listed height: 6 ft 5 in (1.96 m)
- Listed weight: 310 lb (141 kg)

Career information
- High school: Santa Cruz Valley Union (Eloy)
- College: Arizona State (1997–2001)
- NFL draft: 2002: 1st round, 10th overall pick

Career history
- Cincinnati Bengals (2002–2008); Washington Redskins (2009)

Awards and highlights
- PFWA All-Rookie Team (2002); Second-team All-American (2001); Morris Trophy (2001); First-team All-Pac-10 (2001); Second-team All-Pac-10 (2000)

Career NFL statistics
- Games played: 103
- Games started: 97
- Stats at Pro Football Reference

Levi J. Jones (born August 24, 1979) is an American former professional football player who was an offensive tackle in the National Football League (NFL). He played college football for the Arizona State Sun Devils and was selected by the Cincinnati Bengals in the first round of the 2002 NFL draft.

== College career ==
Jones attended Arizona State University. Levi originally went on an academic scholarship, but decided to walk-on to the football team. He earned a bachelor's degree in exercise science with a minor in business.

== Professional career ==
=== Cincinnati Bengals ===
Jones was drafted by the Cincinnati Bengals in the first round (10th overall) of the 2002 NFL draft.

On July 25, 2006, Jones signed a six-year, $30 million contract extension with the Bengals.

Less than a month after the Bengals selected Alabama offensive tackle Andre Smith sixth overall in the 2009 NFL draft, the team released Jones on May 6, 2009.

=== Washington Redskins ===
On October 20, 2009, Jones signed a free agent contract with the Washington Redskins and was the starting left tackle.

== Personal ==
=== Las Vegas scuffle ===
In March 2007, Joey Porter and Jones were involved in a brawl at a Las Vegas casino. Porter still had unresolved issues with Jones from their days in the AFC North between Porter's Pittsburgh Steelers and Jones' Cincinnati Bengals. On May 30, Porter pleaded not guilty to misdemeanor battery and was ordered to pay a $1,000 fine. Porter was docked 3 game paychecks for his actions. Later reports into the incident revealed that it was not just Porter, but also 6 of his friends including convicted felon Ross Earl who attacked Jones.
