= Eddie Cade =

American football player (born 1973)

No. 41
- Position: Safety

Personal information
- Born: August 4, 1973 (age 53); Casa Grande, Arizona, U.S.
- Listed height: 6 ft 1 in (1.85 m)
- Listed weight: 206 lb (93 kg)

Career information
- High school: Santa Cruz Valley Union (Eloy, Arizona)
- College: Arizona State (1991–1994)
- NFL draft: 1995: undrafted

Career history
- New England Patriots (1995); Kansas City Chiefs (1997)*; Scottish Claymores (1998); Pittsburgh Steelers (1998)*
- * Offseason or practice squad member only
- Stats at Pro Football Reference

Eddie Ray Cade (born August 4, 1973) is an American former professional football player who was a safety for one season with the New England Patriots of the National Football League (NFL). He played college football for the Arizona State Sun Devils. He also played for the Scottish Claymores of NFL Europe.

== Early life ==
Eddie Ray Cade was born on August 4, 1973, in Casa Grande, Arizona. He attended Santa Cruz Valley Union High School in Eloy, Arizona and lettered in football, basketball and track. He garnered all-conference and all-state recognition in football as a running back and defensive back, helping Santa Cruz Valley achieve a 13–0 record and win a state title. He had a career-high 246 rushing yards in a game his senior year. Cade was also named all-conference in track and basketball.

== College career ==
Cade was a member of the Arizona State Sun Devils from 1991 to 1994 and a three-year letterman from 1992 to 1994. He did not play in 1991. He appeared in ten games, no starts, in 1992. He started nine games at free safety in 1993, recording 57 tackles, two interceptions, four pass breakups, three forced fumbles, and two fumble recoveries. Cade started 10 games at free safety as a senior in 1994, totaling 82 tackles, one interception, and four pass breakups. He accumulated career totals of 147 tackles, three interceptions, four forced fumbles, and four fumble recoveries. He majored in family studies while at Arizona State.

== Professional career ==
After going undrafted in the 1995 NFL draft, Cade signed with the New England Patriots on April 24, 1995. He played in ten games for the Patriots during his rookie year in 1995. He was released on August 14, 1996. He was listed as a safety with the Patriots.

Cade was signed by the Kansas City Chiefs on February 5, 1997. He was released on August 19, 1997.

He played for the Scottish Claymores of NFL Europe during the 1998 NFL Europe season as a free safety, recording 37 defensive tackles, one special teams tackle, one interception, and four pass breakups.

Cade signed with the Pittsburgh Steelers on July 15, 1998, but was later waived on August 24, 1998.
