= List of Los Angeles Chargers first-round draft picks =

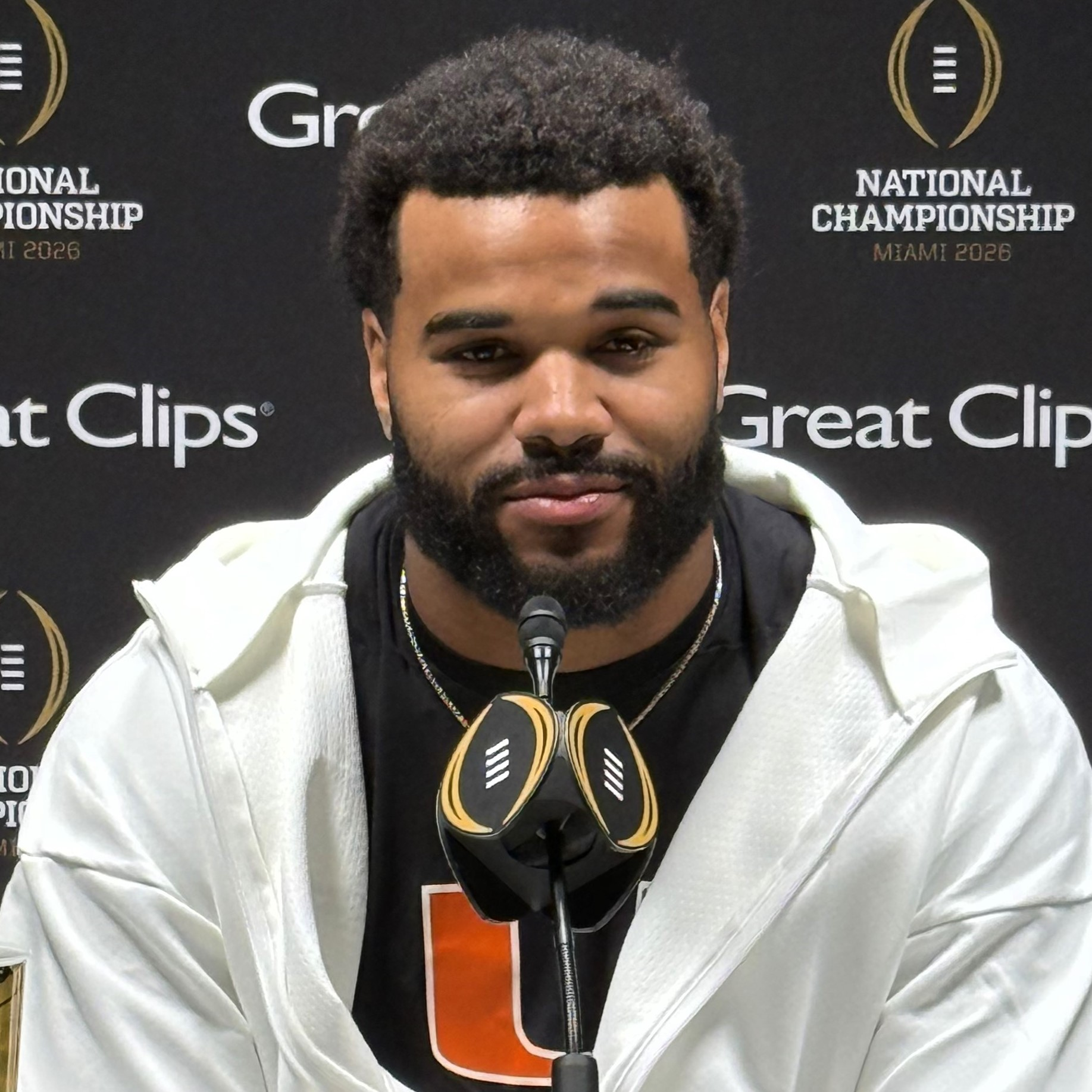
The Los Angeles Chargers selected linebacker Akheem Mesidor No. 22 overall in 2026.

The Los Angeles Chargers are an American football franchise who play in the National Football League (NFL). They began play in Los Angeles in 1960 as charter members of the American Football League (AFL), switched cities to San Diego the following season, and returned to the Greater Los Angeles area in 2017. The AFL was formed as rivals to the established NFL, though the leagues would later merge, with all AFL teams including the Chargers officially joining the NFL in 1970.

Every year during April, each NFL franchise seeks to add new players to its roster through a collegiate draft, known as the NFL draft. The Chargers took part in the rival AFL draft for the first seven years of their existence, meaning that they had to compete for new players' signatures with whichever club had picked them in the NFL draft. Their first draft selection was Monty Stickles, an end from the University of Notre Dame. Unlike all future picks, he was not chosen by the Chargers themselves, but rather assigned in a territorial draft at a meeting of the AFL's original owners. Stickles never played for the Chargers as he chose to sign for the San Francisco 49ers instead; overall, the Chargers were unable to sign their first-round selection four times during their first seven years. After that, the two leagues conducted a common draft, ending the inter-league bidding war. Over a decade later, the original United States Football League (USFL) challenged the NFL by conducting its own collegiate drafts from 1983 to 1986. The Chargers temporarily lost two of their first-round picks (Gary Anderson and Mossy Cade) to USFL clubs, though both joined the NFL in 1985 as the USFL struggled financially.

In the NFL draft, teams are ranked in inverse order based on the previous season's record, with the worst record picking first, and the second worst picking second and so on. Teams have the option of trading away their picks to other teams for different picks, players, or a combination thereof. Thus, it is not uncommon for a team's actual draft pick to differ from their assigned draft pick, or for a team to have extra or no draft picks in any round due to these trades. The Chargers have been without a first-round pick eight times in their history, including six times in seven years from 1994 to 2000. They have possessed two first-round picks on seven different occasions; once, in 1983, they had three such picks.

The Chargers have twice been in possession of the No. 1 overall pick, though in neither case has the player selected played for them. In 2001, they traded the No. 1 pick to the Atlanta Falcons before the draft for three draft picks and one player; the Falcons selected Michael Vick, while the Chargers chose LaDainian Tomlinson with the No. 5 overall pick. In 2004, the projected No. 1 pick, Eli Manning, stated that he would not play in San Diego. The Chargers still selected him, but quickly traded the player to the New York Giants for Philip Rivers (who the Giants had just drafted at No. 4 overall) and three draft picks, one of which was used to select Shawne Merriman in the first round the following season.

Twenty-five of the Chargers' first round selections have been nominated for at least one Pro Bowl or AFL All-Star game; Junior Seau has the most such nominations, with twelve. Three have been elected to the Pro Football Hall of Fame: Kellen Winslow, Seau and Tomlinson.

The team's most recent first-round pick was Akheem Mesidor, a linebacker from Miami selected No. 22 overall in 2026. They have chosen 34 defensive players in the first round, and 35 offensive players; defensive linemen have been the most common position, with 13 selected. Ohio State, Tennessee, Texas, TCU and Notre Dame are tied for the most players chosen by the Chargers from one university, with three selections each.

== Player selections ==
Key
^	Indicates the player was inducted into the Pro Football Hall of Fame
†	Indicates the player was selected for the Pro Bowl or AFL All-Star game at any time in their career
*	Selected number one overall
‡	Current Charger: statistics correct through 2025 season
—	The Chargers did not draft a player in the first round that year.
Year	Each year links to an article about that particular NFL Draft.
Pick	Indicates the number of the pick within the first round
Position	Indicates the position of the player in the NFL
College	The player's college football team
Seasons	The number of seasons in which the player had at least one appearance for the Chargers
Pro Bowls	The number of seasons in which the player was voted to the Pro Bowl or AFL All-Star game as a Charger
Games	Regular season games in which the player appeared for the Chargers
Starts	Regular season games in which the player started for the Chargers

Position abbreviations
C	Center
CB	Cornerback
DE	Defensive end
DT	Defensive tackle
E	End
FB	Fullback
G	Guard
LB	Linebacker
QB	Quarterback
RB	Running back
S	Safety
T	Tackle
TE	Tight end
WR	Wide receiver

Los Angeles Chargers first-round draft picks
Year	Pick	Player name	Position	College	Stats with Chargers				Notes	Ref
Year	Pick	Player name	Position	College	Seasons	Pro Bowls	Games	Starts	Notes	Ref
1960	N/A	Monty Stickles	E	Notre Dame	0	0	0	0	Territorial selection, assigned by the AFL's original owners. Signed for the NFL's San Francisco 49ers instead.	
1961	7	Earl Faison †	DE	Indiana	6	5	67	64		
1962	8	Bob Ferguson	FB	Ohio State	0	0	0	0	Signed for the NFL's Pittsburgh Steelers	
1963	2	Walt Sweeney †	G	Syracuse	11	9	154	140		
1964	8	Ted Davis	LB	Georgia Tech	0	0	0	0	Signed for the NFL's Baltimore Colts	
1965	6	Steve DeLong †	DE	Tennessee	7	1	89	75		
1966	7	Don Davis	DT	Los Angeles State	0	0	0	0	Signed for the NFL's New York Giants	
1967	14	Ron Billingsley	DT	Wyoming	4	0	44	25		
1968	4	Russ Washington †	T	Missouri	15	5	200	196	Pick received in trade with Denver Broncos (Note: On August 15, 1967, the Chargers traded quarterback Steve Tensi to the Denver Broncos for first-round picks in the 1968 and 1969 drafts.)	
1968	18	Jim Hill	CB	Texas A&M–Kingsville	3	0	42	38		
1969	9	Marty Domres	QB	Columbia	3	0	22	6	Pick received in trade with Denver Broncos	
1969	18	Bob Babich	LB	Miami (OH)	3	0	42	36		
1970	15	Walker Gillette	WR	Richmond	2	0	25	1		
1971	13	Leon Burns	RB	Long Beach State	1	0	14	4		
1972	—	No pick	—	—	—	—	—	—	Pick traded to Green Bay Packers (Note: On June 23, 1971 the Chargers traded their first-round pick in the 1972 NFL draft (No. 11 overall) to the Green Bay Packers for defensive tackle Kevin Hardy.)	
1973	25	Johnny Rodgers	WR	Nebraska	2	0	17	7	Original pick traded to Philadelphia Eagles. (Note: On July 31, 1972 the Chargers traded their first-round pick in the 1973 NFL draft (No. 6) to the Philadelphia Eagles for linebacker Tim Rossovich.) Acquired another first-round pick from the Colts in a separate trade. (Note: On August 7, 1972 the Chargers traded quarterback Marty Domres to the Baltimore Colts for a first-round pick in the 1973 NFL draft and tight end John Andrews.) Initially signed for CFL's Montreal Alouettes. Joined the Chargers in 1977.	
1974	2	Bo Matthews	RB	Colorado	6	0	78	31		
1974	15	Don Goode	LB	Kansas	6	0	81	62	Pick received in trade with Cleveland Browns (Note: On September 5, 1973, the Chargers traded a fourth-round pick in the 1975 draft and linebacker Bob Babich to the Cleveland Browns for a first-round pick in the 1974 draft and a second-round pick in the 1975 draft.)	
1975	8	Gary Johnson †	DT	Grambling State	10	4	134	123		
1975	22	Mike Williams	CB	LSU	8	0	107	101	Pick received in trade with Washington Redskins (Note: On July 19, 1973, the Chargers traded running back Duane Thomas to Washington Redskins for a first-round pick in the 1975 draft and a second-round pick in the 1976 draft.)	
1976	4	Joe Washington †	RB	Oklahoma	1	0	13	0		
1977	24	Bob Rush	C	Memphis	5	0	70	12	Moved down the draft order in trade with Dallas Cowboys (Note: On August 30, 1976, the Chargers traded their first-round (No. 14) and second-round picks in the 1977 draft for the Dallas Cowboys' first-round pick in the 1977 draft (No. 24) and quarterback Clint Longley)	
1978	14	John Jefferson †	WR	Arizona State	3	3	45	45		
1979	13	Kellen Winslow ^	TE	Missouri	9	5	109	94	Moved up the draft order in trade with Cleveland Browns (Note: On May 3, 1979, the Chargers traded their first-round (No. 20) and second-round picks in the 1979 draft to the Cleveland Browns for their first-round pick in the 1979 draft (No. 13).)	
1980	—	No pick	—	—	—	—	—	—	Pick traded to Green Bay Packers (Note: On April 26, 1979 the Chargers traded their first-round pick in the 1980 NFL draft (No. 26 overall) and a seventh-round pick in 1979 to the Green Bay Packers for cornerback Willie Buchanon.)	
1981	24	James Brooks †	RB	Auburn	3	0	38	8		
1982	—	No pick	—	—	—	—	—	—	Initially moved up the draft order in trade with Green Bay Packers. (Note: On September 17, 1981, the Chargers traded wide receiver John Jefferson to the Green Bay Packers for the right to swap picks in the first round of the 1982 draft (this option was exercised, as San Diego had pick No. 22 and Green Bay had pick No. 13), a 1983 first-round pick, a 1982 second-round pick, a 1984 second-round pick and wide receiver Aundra Thompson) Traded new first-round pick to the Saints 12 days later. (Note: On September 29, 1981, the Chargers trade a 1982 first-round pick, a 1982 third-round pick and wide receiver Aundra Thompson to the New Orleans Saints for wide receiver Wes Chandler.)	
1983	5	Billy Ray Smith, Jr.	LB	Arkansas	10	0	126	111	Moved up the draft order in trade with San Francisco 49ers (Note: On October 2, 1981, the Chargers traded defensive end Fred Dean to the San Francisco 49ers for the right to swap picks in the first round of the 1983 draft (this option was exercised, as San Diego had pick No. 22 and San Francisco had pick No. 5), and a second-round pick in the 1983 draft.)	
1983	20	Gary Anderson †	RB	Arkansas	4	1	54	38	Pick received in trade with Green Bay Packers. Initially signed for USFL's Tampa Bay Bandits. Joined the Chargers in 1985.	
1983	22	Gill Byrd †	CB	San Jose State	10	2	149	146	Pick initially traded to San Francisco 49ers. Regained in subsequent trade. (Note: On April 22, 1983 the Chargers traded a pair of second-round picks in the 1983 NFL draft to the San Francisco 49ers for a first-round pick in the 1983 draft.)	
1984	6	Mossy Cade	S	Texas	0	0	0	0	Initially signed for USFL's Memphis Showboats. NFL signing rights later traded to Green Bay Packers. (Note: On August 30, 1985 the Chargers traded Mossy Cade to the Green Bay Packers for a first-round pick in the 1986 draft and a conditional pick in the 1987 draft (this became a fifth-round pick).)	
1985	12	Jim Lachey †	T	Ohio State	3	1	44	43		
1986	8	Leslie O'Neal †	DE	Oklahoma State	9	6	133	125	Acquired extra first-round pick in trade with Green Bay Packers. Subsequently moved up the draft order in trade with Minnesota Vikings. (Note: On April 26, 1986, the Chargers traded their first-round (No. 14) and second-round picks in the 1986 draft to the Minnesota Vikings for their first-round (No. 8) and third-round picks in the 1986 draft.)	
1986	13	James FitzPatrick	T	USC	4	0	38	14		
1987	24	Rod Bernstine	RB	Texas A&M	6	0	63	25	Moved down the draft order in trade with Cleveland Browns (Note: On April 28, 1987, the Chargers traded their first-round (No. 5) and second-round picks in the 1987 draft for the Cleveland Browns' first-round (No. 24) and second-round picks in the 1987 draft and linebacker Chip Banks.)	
1988	15	Anthony Miller †	WR	Tennessee	6	4	93	91		
1989	8	Burt Grossman	DE	Pittsburgh	5	0	72	71		
1990	5	Junior Seau ^	LB	USC	13	12	200	199		
1991	9	Stanley Richard	S	Texas	4	0	61	60		
1992	23	Chris Mims	DE	Tennessee	7	0	93	57	Original pick traded to Washington Redskins. (Note: On April 21, 1991 the Chargers traded their first-round pick in the 1992 NFL draft (No. 6) to Washington Redskins for a second-round pick in the 1991 draft and a fifth-round pick in the 1992 draft.) Acquired another first-round pick from the Oilers in a separate trade. (Note: On August 7, 1972 the Chargers traded defensive end Lee Williams to the Houston Oilers for a first-round pick in the 1992 NFL draft and wide receiver Shawn Jefferson.)	
1993	22	Darrien Gordon	CB	Stanford	3	0	48	29		
1994	—	No pick	—	—	—	—	—	—	Pick traded to San Francisco 49ers (Note: On April 25, 1993 the Chargers traded their first-round pick in the 1994 NFL draft (No. 15 overall) to the San Francisco 49ers for a second-round pick in the 1993 draft.)	
1995	—	No pick	—	—	—	—	—	—	Pick traded to Carolina Panthers (Note: On April 22, 1995 the Chargers traded their first-round pick in the 1995 NFL draft (No. 29 overall) to the Carolina Panthers for their second, third and fourth-round picks in the 1995 draft.)	
1996	—	No pick	—	—	—	—	—	—	Pick traded to Detroit Lions (Note: On April 22, 1995 the Chargers traded their first-round pick in the 1996 NFL draft (No. 21 overall) to the Detroit Lions for a second-round pick in the 1995 draft.)	
1997	—	No pick	—	—	—	—	—	—	Pick traded to Tampa Bay Buccaneers (Note: On April 20, 1996 the Chargers traded their first-round pick in the 1997 NFL draft (No. 16 overall) to the Buccaneers for a second-round pick in the 1996 draft.)	
1998	2	Ryan Leaf	QB	Washington State	2	0	21	18	Moved up the draft order in trade with Arizona Cardinals (Note: On March 12, 1998, the Chargers traded their first-round (No. 3) and second-round picks in the 1998 draft, their first-round pick (No. 8) in the 1999 draft, wide receiver Eric Metcalf and linebacker Patrick Sapp to the Arizona Cardinals for their first-round pick in the 1998 draft (No. 2).)	
1999	—	No pick	—	—	—	—	—	—	Pick traded to Arizona Cardinals	
2000	—	No pick	—	—	—	—	—	—	Pick traded to Tampa Bay Buccaneers (Note: On April 18, 1998 the Chargers traded their first-round pick in the 2000 NFL draft (No. 13 overall) to the Tampa Bay Buccaneers for a second-round pick in the 1998 draft.)	
2001	5	LaDainian Tomlinson ^	RB	TCU	9	5	141	141	Moved down the draft order in trade with Atlanta Falcons (Note: On April 20, 2001, the Chargers traded their first-round pick (No. 1) in the 2001 draft to the Atlanta Falcons for their first-round (No. 5) and third-round picks in the 2001 draft, their second-round pick in the 2002 draft, and wide receiver Tim Dwight.)	
2002	5	Quentin Jammer	CB	Texas	11	0	172	161		
2003	30	Sammy Davis	CB	Texas A&M	3	0	44	30	Moved down the draft order in trade with Philadelphia Eagles (Note: On April 26, 2003 the Chargers traded their first-round (No. 15) pick in the 2003 draft for the Philadelphia Eagles' first (No. 30) and second-round picks in the 2003 draft.)	
2004	1	Eli Manning*†	QB	Mississippi	0	0	0	0	Manning was traded to the New York Giants an hour after being drafted. (Note: On April 24, 2004 the Chargers traded the signing rights for No. 1 overall pick Eli Manning to the New York Giants for the signing rights to No. 4 overall pick Philip Rivers, a third-round pick in the 2004 draft, a first-round pick (No. 12) in the 2005 draft and a fifth-round pick in the 2005 draft.)	
2005	12	Shawne Merriman †	LB	Maryland	6	3	60	53	Pick received in trade with New York Giants	
2005	28	Luis Castillo	DE	Northwestern	7	0	82	79		
2006	19	Antonio Cromartie †	CB	Florida State	4	1	64	39		
2007	30	Craig Davis	WR	LSU	4	0	25	2		
2008	27	Antoine Cason	CB	Arizona	5	0	80	49		
2009	16	Larry English	LB	Northern Illinois	5	0	52	9		
2010	12	Ryan Mathews †	RB	Fresno State	5	1	60	52	Moved up the draft order in trade with Miami Dolphins (Note: On April 22, 2010, the Chargers traded their first (No. 28), second and fourth-round picks in the 2010 draft and linebacker Tim Dobbins to the Miami Dolphins for their first (No. 12), fourth and sixth-round picks in the 2010 draft.)	
2011	18	Corey Liuget	DT	Illinois	8	0	108	103		
2012	18	Melvin Ingram †	DE	South Carolina	9	3	113	96		
2013	11	D. J. Fluker	T	Alabama	4	0	59	59		
2014	25	Jason Verrett †	CB	TCU	4	1	25	22		
2015	15	Melvin Gordon †	RB	Wisconsin	5	2	67	62	Moved up the draft order in trade with San Francisco 49ers (Note: On April 30, 2015 the Chargers traded their first (No. 17) and fourth-round picks in the 2015 draft and their fifth-round pick in the 2016 draft to the San Francisco 49ers for their first-round pick (No. 15) in the 2015 draft.)	
2016	3	Joey Bosa †	DE	Ohio State	9	5	107	93		
2017	7	Mike Williams ‡	WR	Clemson	7	0	88	62		
2018	17	Derwin James † ‡	S	Florida State	7	5	98	98		
2019	28	Jerry Tillery	DT	Notre Dame	4	0	54	29		
2020	6	Justin Herbert † ‡	QB	Oregon	6	2	95	95		
2020	23	Kenneth Murray	LB	Oklahoma	4	0	59	53	Pick received in trade with New England Patriots (Note: On April 23, 2020 the Chargers traded their second and third-round picks in the 2020 draft to the New England Patriots for their first-round pick in the 2020 draft.)	
2021	13	Rashawn Slater † ‡	T	Northwestern	4	2	51	51		
2022	17	Zion Johnson ‡	G	Boston College	4	0	66	65		
2023	21	Quentin Johnston ‡	WR	TCU	3	0	46	31		
2024	5	Joe Alt † ‡	T	Notre Dame	2	1	22	22		
2025	22	Omarion Hampton ‡	RB	North Carolina	1	0	9	6		
2026	22	Akheem Mesidor ‡	LB	Miami	0	0	0	0		

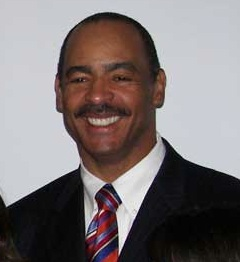
The Chargers traded up to draft future Hall of Fame tight end Kellen Winslow in 1979.

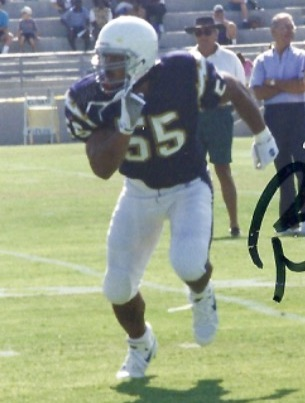
Hall of Fame linebacker Junior Seau was drafted No. 5 overall in 1990. He made 12 Pro Bowls in 13 seasons in San Diego.

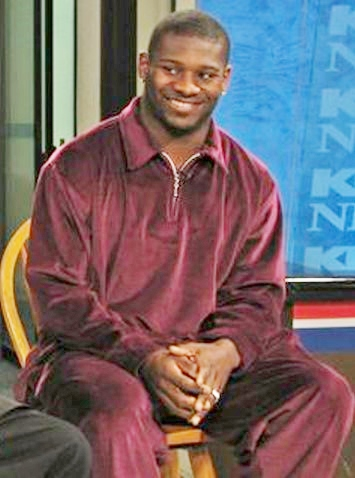
Hall of Fame running back LaDainian Tomlinson was selected No. 5 overall by the Chargers in 2001.

== Breakdowns ==
Breakdown by college (min. 2)
College	Count	Most recent
Notre Dame	3	Joe Alt (2024)
Ohio State	3	Joey Bosa (2016)
Tennessee	3	Chris Mims (1992)
Texas	3	Quentin Jammer (2002)
TCU	3	Quentin Johnston (2023)
Arkansas	2	Gary Anderson (1983)
Florida State	2	Derwin James (2018)
LSU	2	Craig Davis (2007)
Missouri	2	Kellen Winslow (1979)
Northwestern	2	Rashawn Slater (2021)
Oklahoma	2	Kenneth Murray (2020)
Texas A&M	2	Sammy Davis (2003)
USC	2	Junior Seau (1990)

Breakdown by position
Position	Count	Most recent
Defensive line (DE, DL)	13	Jerry Tillery (2019)
Defensive back (CB, S)	12	Derwin James (2018)
Running back (FB, RB)	11	Omarion Hampton (2025)
Offensive line (C, G, T)	9	Joe Alt (2024)
Linebacker (LB)	9	Akheem Mesidor (2026)
Wide receiver (WR)	7	Quentin Johnston (2023)
Quarterback (QB)	4	Justin Herbert (2020)
Tight end (E, TE)	2	Kellen Winslow (1979)
