= Eloy Municipal Airport =

Airport in Pinal County, Arizona

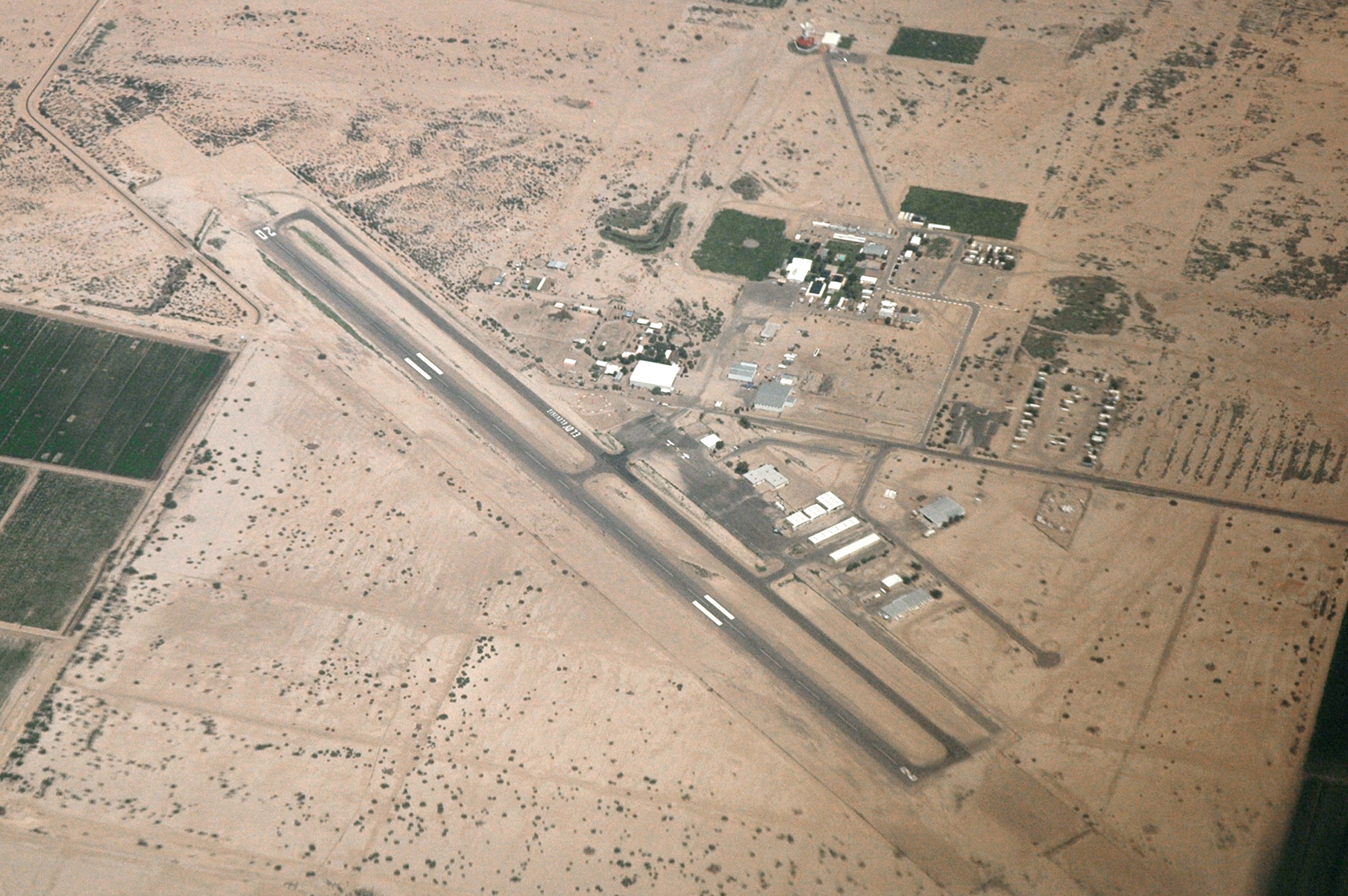
- IATA: none; ICAO: none; FAA LID: E60

Summary
- Airport type: Public
- Owner/Operator: Pinal County
- Serves: Eloy, Arizona
- Elevation AMSL: 1,511.2 ft (460.6 m)
- Coordinates: 32.8067218°N 111.5866263°W
- Website: Official site

Map
- Location within Arizona Location within the United States

Runways
Direction	Length		Surface
Direction	ft	m	Surface
2/20	3,901	1,189	Asphalt

Statistics (2017)
- Aircraft operations: 30000
- Based aircraft: 22
- Source: Federal Aviation Administration

Eloy Municipal Airport (FAA LID: E60) is a public use non-towered airport located 3.5 miles (3.0 nmi; 5.6 km) northwest of the central business district of Eloy, a city in Pinal County, Arizona, United States. It is 50 miles (43 nmi; 80 km) southeast of Phoenix Sky Harbor International Airport.

Although most U.S. airports use the same three-letter location identifier for the FAA, IATA, and ICAO this airport is only assigned E60 by the FAA.

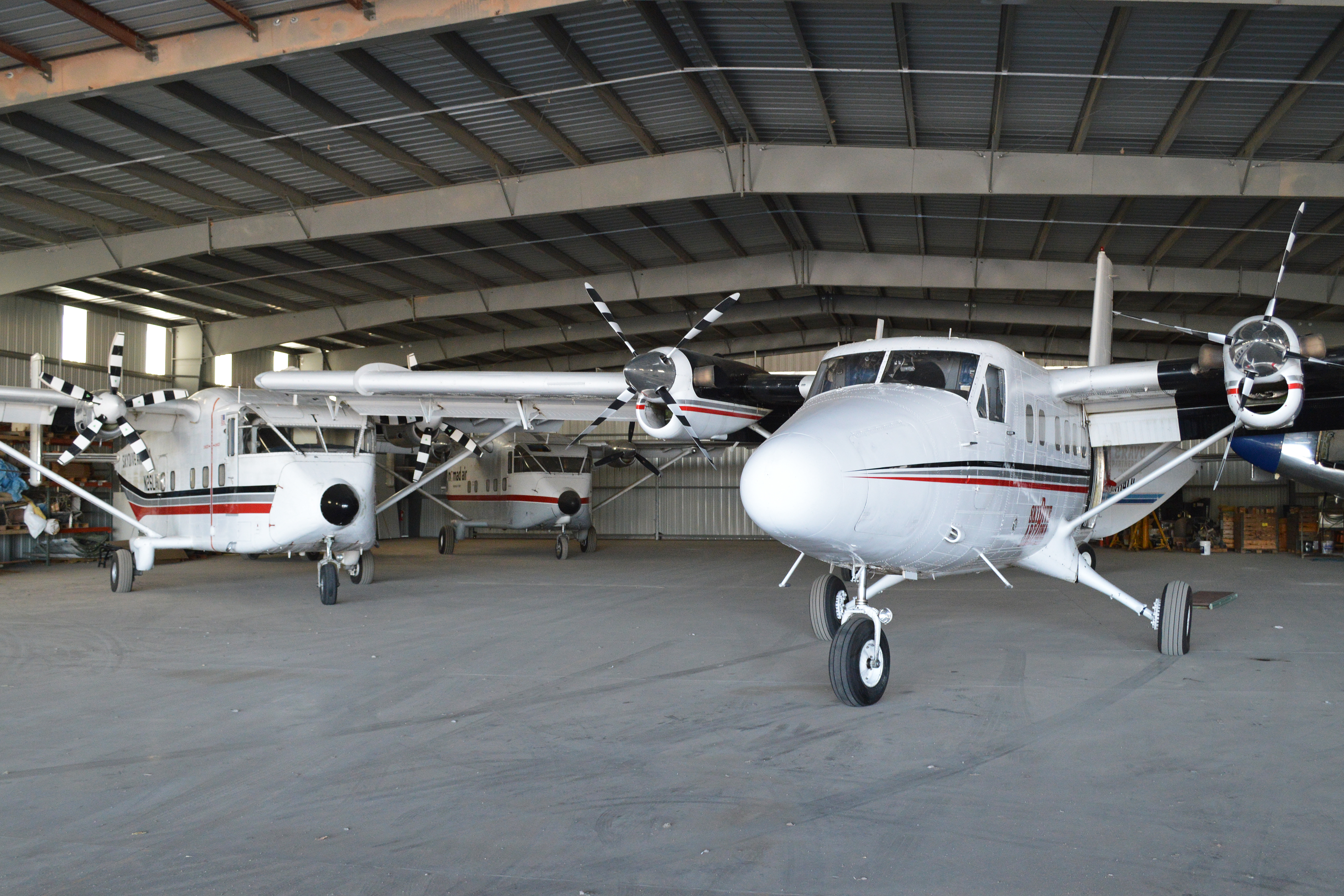
Skydive Arizona hangar

The airport was opened in February 1969.

Since 1991 the airport has been home to Skydive Arizona, operating the largest skydiving center in the world with a fleet of four Twin Otters, seven Skyvans, and one Douglas DC-3.

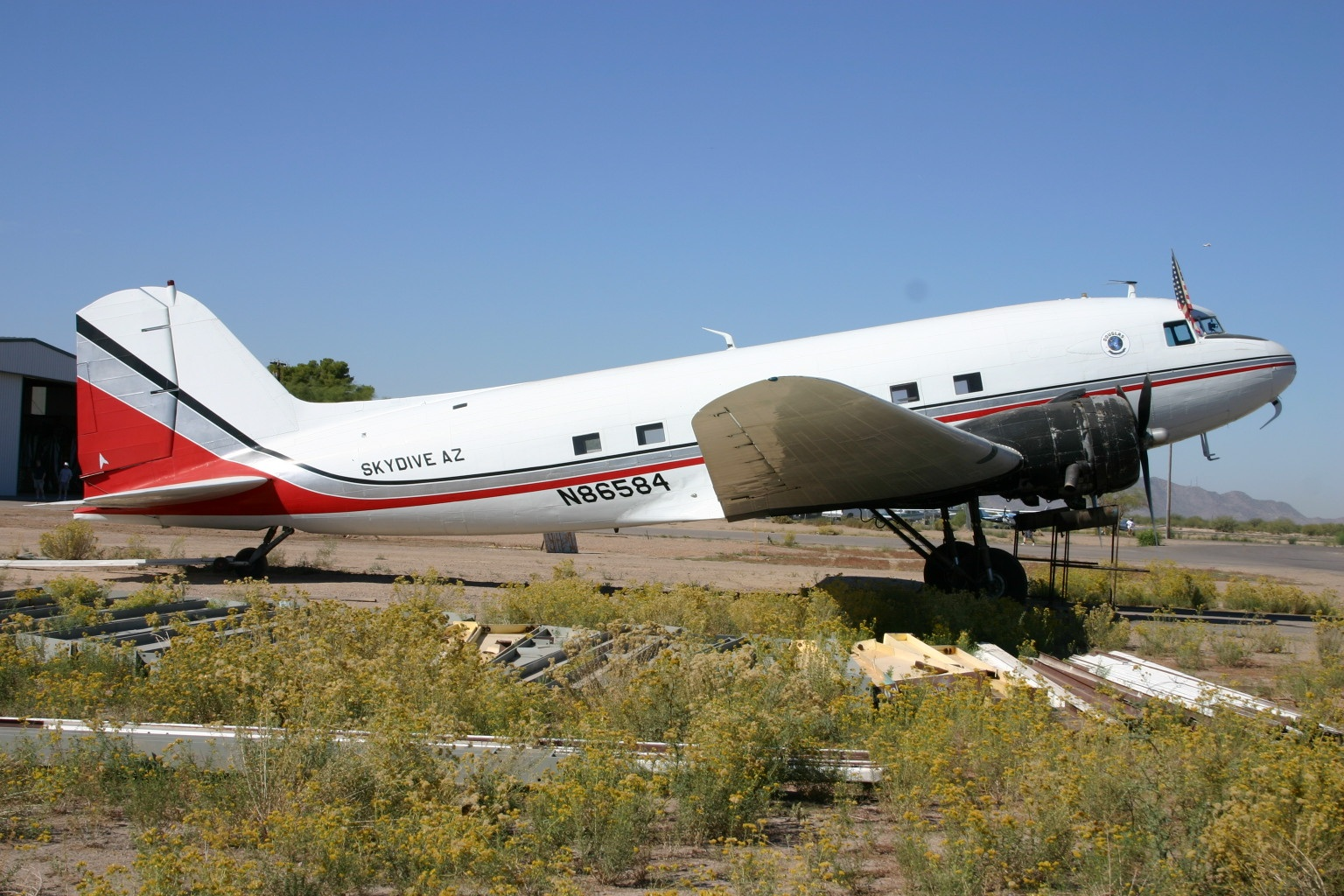
Skydive Arizona DC-3

== Facilities and aircraft ==
Eloy Municipal Airport covers an area of 371 acres (150 ha) at an elevation of 1,511.2 ft (460.6 m) above mean sea level. It has one asphalt runway:

- 2/20 measuring 3,901 ft × 75 ft (1,189 m × 23 m)

For the 12-month period ending April 20, 2017, the airport had 30,000 aircraft operations, an average of 82 per day: 99.5% general aviation and 0.5% military. At that time there were 22 aircraft based at this airport: 55% single-engine, 10% ultralight, 35% multi-engine, no jet, and no helicopters.

== See also ==
- List of airports in Arizona
