= Eloy Detention Center =

Private prison in Pinal County, Arizona

Coordinates: 32°49′04″N 111°31′13″W

- Interactive map of Eloy Detention Center
- Location: 1705 E Hanna Road Eloy, Arizona
- Status: open
- Security class: minimum & medium
- Capacity: 1596
- Opened: 1994
- Managed by: CoreCivic

The Eloy Detention Center is a private prison located in Eloy, Pinal County, Arizona, owned and operated by CoreCivic, formerly the Corrections Corporation of America, under contract with the U.S. Immigration and Customs Enforcement (ICE).

== History ==
The facility opened in 1994 and approximately 1,550 male and female individuals being held for immigration violations at a mix of minimum and medium security levels. Each individual costs approximately $180 per day to house. Eloy is adjacent to three other prisons also run by CoreCivic: the Red Rock Correctional Center, the La Palma Correctional Facility, and the Saguaro Correctional Center.

After the Trump administration's controversial zero-tolerance family separation policy in 2018, the facility housed roughly 300 mothers separated from their children.

== Suicides ==
ICE's internal Office of Detention Oversight investigated the death of Eloy detainee Manuel Cota-Domingo in 2012, and found serious issues with the quality of medical care provided by CCA. The facility had 15 detainee deaths between 2003 and late 2016, including five suicides. Since 2003, Eloy alone represented 9% of the total inmate deaths in all 250 detention facilities in the United States.

As a result of passing all inspections despite the facility's high suicide rate, the National Immigrant Justice Center found ICE and the Obama administration of being complicit in hiding maltreatment at the center in a 2015 report. Also in 2015, U.S. Representative Raúl Grijalva toured the facility, calling it "the deadliest immigration detention center in the U.S." In late July 2015, he called for an independent investigation into the most recent suicide.

== Notable detainees ==
Year of detention listed in parentheses:

- Binh Thai Luc (2006), Vietnamese plumber
- Ike Ibeabuchi (2014), Nigerian boxer
- Nina Chaubal (c. 2016), Indian transgender rights activist
- Katja Bienert (2017), German actress
