= Firebird Skydiving =

American parachute manufacturer

Firebird USA LLC
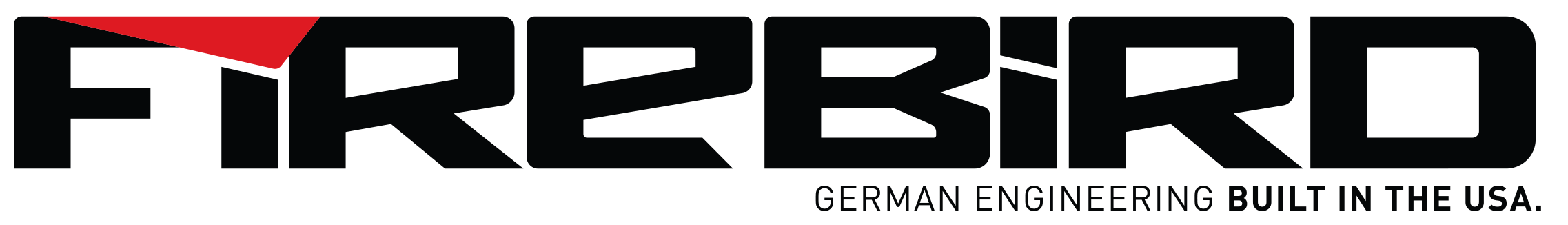
- Company type: Privately held company
- Industry: Aerospace
- Founded: 1995
- Founder: Bernd Pohl
- Headquarters: Eloy, Arizona, United States
- Products: Parachutes
- Website: flyfirebird.com

Firebird USA LLC (formerly Firebird Skydiving GmbH and Firebird Sky Sports AG) is an American parachute manufacturer based in Eloy, Arizona. The company also has locations in Germany, Sri Lanka, and the Czech Republic, and was formerly based in Füssen and Bitburg, Germany. The company specializes in the design and manufacture of parachutes and at one time also constructed paragliders and parafoil kites.

== Background ==
Firebird was founded as Performance Variable by Bernd Pohl in 1995. In 2017 skydivers Sara and Steve Curtis, and George Reuter purchased Firebird. After previously manufacturing its products in Germany and the Czech Republic, in 2018, the company moved its production facility to Eloy, Arizona, a city that has the world's biggest drop zone.

In the mid-2000s, as Firebird Sky Sports AG, the company produced a range of 11 different models of paragliders, including the beginner Firebird Sub-One and Z-One, the intermediate Grid and Hornet, the competition Debute and Tribute as well as the two-place Choice Zip Bi, that incorporated zippers to reduce its wing area. Once one of the world's leading manufacturers of paragliders, the company stopped producing them around 2013 to concentrate on parachutes for military and civil applications, along with reserve parachutes. Today, Firebird manufactures custom parachutes and related products, such as tandem rigs for parachutes, reserve parachutes, harness-and-container systems, and magnetic riser covers.

== Products ==
=== Canopies ===
- FB Tandem
- Rush Reserve
- Quick 400 Reserve

=== Containers ===
- Evo
- Evo Student
- Evo Tandem

== Aircraft ==
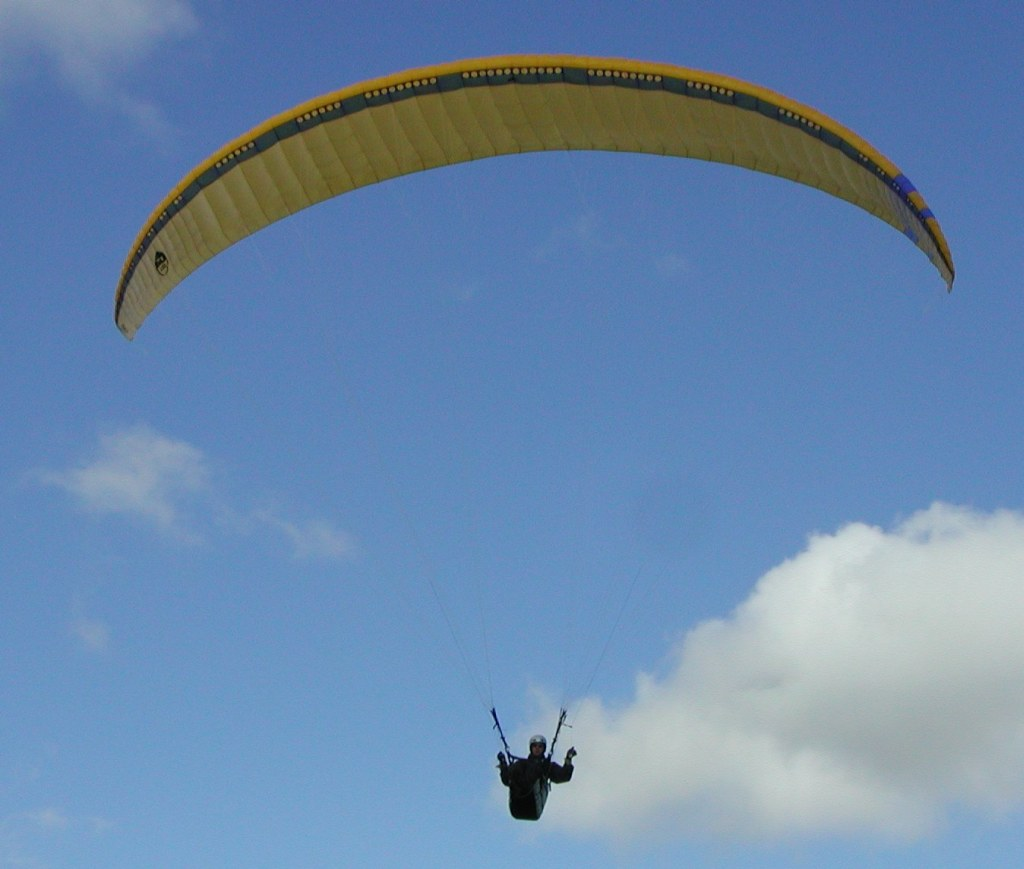
Firebird Hornet Sport

Summary of paragliders built by Firebird, introduced in the mid-2000s and since out of production:

- Firebird Choice Zip Bi
- Firebird Debute
- Firebird Grid
- Firebird Hornet
- Firebird Hornet Sport
- Firebird Sub-One
- Firebird Tribute
- Firebird Z-One
