= La Palma Correctional Facility =

Prison in Eloy, Pinal County, Arizona

Coordinates: 32°48′52″N 111°31′44″W

- Interactive map of La Palma Correctional Facility
- Location: 5501 N La Palma Road Eloy, Arizona
- Status: open
- Security class: medium
- Capacity: 3060
- Opened: 2008
- Managed by: CoreCivic

The La Palma Correctional Facility is a privately owned and managed medium-security prison for men, located in Eloy, Pinal County, Arizona, under contract with the Arizona Department of Corrections, Rehabilitation, and Reentry.

The prison opened in 2008, and houses 3,060 inmates for the Arizona Department of Corrections, Rehabilitation, and Reentry.

La Palma is adjacent to three other prisons also run by CoreCivic: the Eloy Detention Center, the Red Rock Correctional Center, and the Saguaro Correctional Center.

== Notable Inmates ==
Inmate Name	Register Number	Status	Details
Michael Crane	257302	Serving a life sentence without parole.	One of the perpetrators of the 2012 murders of Bruce Gaudet, and couple Lawrence and Glenna Shapiro.
Johnathan Doody	103439	Serving a life sentence.	One of the perpetrators of the 1991 Waddell Buddhist temple shooting in which 9 people are murdered.
