= Honolulu Strangler =

Unidentified Hawaiian serial killer and rapist

The Honolulu Strangler
- Other name: "The Honolulu Rapist"

Details
- Victims: 5
- Span of crimes: May 1985 – April 1986
- Country: United States
- State: Hawaii
- Date apprehended: N/A

The Honolulu Strangler, also known as The Honolulu Rapist, is the nickname given to an unidentified serial killer who is believed to have killed five women in Hawaii from 1985 and 1986. He is the second known serial killer active in the state (after Eugene Barrett).

== Victims ==
=== Vicki Gail Purdy ===
The first victim was Vicki Gail Purdy, age 25, a military spouse of Gary Purdy, an army helicopter pilot. She had left to go clubbing in Waikīkī on May 29, 1985, but failed to meet her friends. She was last seen by the taxi driver who drove her to the Shorebird Hotel at 12:00 a.m., apparently to retrieve her car, which was later found in the hotel parking lot. The next morning, her body was found in an embankment at Keehi Lagoon, wearing her yellow jumpsuit. Her hands were bound behind her back, and she had been raped and strangled. Her husband told police he suspected her death to be associated with her job, working at a video rental store that also handled pornographic film, where two women were stabbed to death one year earlier.

=== Regina Sakamoto ===
The second victim was Regina Sakamoto, age 17, of Leilehua High School. She had missed her bus from Waipahu to school on January 14, 1986, and was last heard from by her boyfriend at 7:15 a.m. when she called to tell him she would be late. On January 15, her body was found at Keehi Lagoon wearing her blue tank top and white sweatshirt, but her lower body was unclothed. Her hands bound behind her back, she had been raped and strangled. She was planning on attending Hawaii Pacific University in the fall. This second case led police to suspect the same killer as the first because of the same modus operandi.

=== Denise Hughes ===
The third victim was Denise Hughes, age 21, a secretary for a telephone company who commuted by bus and was active in her Christian church. She did not show up to work on January 30, and was found dead in Moanalua stream by three young fishermen on February 1. Her decomposing body was clothed in a blue dress, wrapped in a blue tarp, and with her hands bound. She had been sexually assaulted and strangled. Prompted by a third body, a serial killer taskforce was established on February 5.

=== Louise Medeiros ===
The fourth victim was Louise Medeiros, age 25. She lived in Waipahu but had gone to Kauai to meet her extended family because of the death of her mother. Medeiros took a late night flight back to Oahu on March 26 and told her family she would get home by bus from the airport. She disembarked the airplane and disappeared. Her decomposing body was found April 2 near Waikele stream by road workers. She was wearing her blouse, but her lower body was unclothed, and her hands were bound behind her back. Police set up sting operations using policewomen around Keehi Lagoon and the Honolulu International Airport.

=== Linda Pesce ===
The fifth and last known victim of the Honolulu Strangler was Linda Pesce, age 36. According to her roommate, she left home on the morning of April 29 and was expected to be home late that evening, due to a pre-scheduled work meeting. The next morning, after being told that Pesce had not shown up for work and that her car was parked on the side of the Nimitz-H1 viaduct, her roommate reported her missing. A man named Howard Gay told police a psychic told him a body could be located at Sand Island. On May 3, he took police to an exact location, only to find nothing there. Police then searched the entire island and found Pesce's body. She was nude, her hands bound behind her back.

== Investigation ==
The Honolulu Police Department had established a 27-man serial killer taskforce on February 5 with help from the FBI and the Green River taskforce. The killer's profile was that of an opportunist who attacked women who were vulnerable, such as at bus stops, not one who stalks his victims. He also likely lives or works in the area of the attacks, Waipahu or Sand Island.

Police set up roadblocks at the time of the Pesce murder to question frequent commuters. Witnesses came forward saying they had seen a light colored van and a Caucasian or mixed-race man with Pesce's car.

Following the discovery of Pesce's body, police arrested Howard Gay on May 9 as the primary suspect. The suspect's ex-wife and girlfriend described him as a smooth talker. They also provided a potentially incriminating fetish clue, as both recalled engaging in bondage activity, allowing him to tie them up and have sex with their hands bound behind their back. His girlfriend related that on nights after they had fought, he would leave the house, and that these were the same nights the murders had occurred. The suspect lived in Ewa Beach and worked as a mechanic at one of the air freight carriers along Lagoon Drive. Between 8:00 p.m. and 3:00 a.m., the suspect was interrogated, failed a polygraph test and was eventually released.

Police followed the suspect and a $25,000 reward for information was put out by private businesses. Two months after the arrest of the suspect, a woman came forward and claimed she saw a man with an unnamed victim on the night of her murder. She successfully picked Gay out of a photo lineup as the man. She did not want to be a witness because she believed he saw her as well.

Howard Gay died in 2003.

== Media ==
- The case was covered by Casefile True Crime Podcast on October 7, 2017, by the Investigation Discovery (ID) channel program, Breaking Homicide, on May 13, 2018, My Favorite Murder podcast on July 12, 2018, by Ghostlore of Hawaii podcast on July 8, 2022, and Crime Junkie podcast on July 3, 2023

== See also ==
- Kauai serial killer
- Eugene Barrett
- List of fugitives from justice who disappeared
- List of serial killers in the United States

== Sources ==
- Daias, Gary; Dingeman, Robbie (2003). "7: Honolulu's Serial Killings". Honolulu Homicide. Honolulu, Hawaii: Bess Press. pp. 63–79. ISBN 1-57306-156-5.
- "Detectives Hope DNA Can Link Man To Oahu's Serial Killings". Honolulu, Hawaii: KITV. May 2005. p. 1. Archived from the original on September 8, 2011.
