= Kauai serial killer =

Unidentified murderer in Hawaii

- Composite sketch of the perpetrator
- Other names: John; Westside serial killer
- Years active: 2000

Details
- Victims: 2 killed; 1 injured
- Country: United States
- State: Hawaii
- Weapon: Knife
- Date apprehended: N/A

The Kauai serial killer is an unidentified murderer and rapist who murdered two women and injured another on the island of Kauaʻi, Hawaii, between April and August 2000. Despite a composite sketch of the perpetrator and the availability of his DNA, he was never caught, and the murders remain unsolved.

== Murders ==
=== Lisa Bissell ===
On April 7, 2000, the body of Lisa Bissell, a 38-year-old woman from Hanapepe, was found in a ditch close to Polihale State Park. She was raped, beaten, and later stabbed to death. Her throat was also slashed. Some of her belongings were found off of a road in Waimea, so it's believed she was abducted from there.

=== Attempted murder ===
On May 22, 2000, a 52-year-old woman was severely wounded by the perpetrator in Kekaha. The perpetrator approached the victim in the yard she was working in and told her, "My name is John and I'm homeless." The victim recommended that he visit her neighbors home, where the owners frequently let homeless people camp on their property. When she turned around to continue working, the assailant forcefully took her behind the house and beat her, breaking one of her arms. He then sexually assaulted the victim. He later stabbed her in the chest with a knife, but the knife bent after it hit the victim's breastbone, so he threw it in a bush and fled. The victim crawled for three hours until she reached a telephone and called for help.

=== Daren Singer ===
On August 30, 2000, the decomposing body of Daren R. Singer, a 43-year-old woman from Maui, was found at a remote campsite near Pakala Point Beach. She was raped, stabbed in the throat, and beaten to death. Her face was almost beaten beyond the point of recognition. Investigators determined that she was murdered at least 12 hours prior to the discovery of her body. A memorial service held for Singer in September of the same year was attended by more than 500 people.

== Investigation ==
The surviving victim described her attacker, and a composite sketch of the perpetrator was created. A few months after the attack, she was flown to Honolulu and shown a police lineup. The woman was able to eliminate two men from the lineup as being the perpetrator but was not able to narrow down the lineup any further. The police also questioned the seventy registered sex offenders on the island.

=== Similarities between murders ===
- All victims were middle-aged Caucasian women with similar heights and weights.
- All of the victims were sexually assaulted.
- All of the victims were alone when they were attacked.
- A knife was used in every attack.
- All of the attacks happened on the west coast of Kauaʻi.

=== Suspect ===
The prime suspect in the case is Waldorf Roy Wilson, a Hawaiian sex offender. He was convicted of a rape and kidnapping on Oʻahu in 1983. Wilson was paroled on January 9, 1999, and moved to Kauaʻi. On September 12, 2000, Wilson was arrested again for violating his parole. After he was arrested, KHNL Channel 8 News broadcast that Wilson had been arrested for parole violations after being questioned about the murders. This led to Wilson suing the Kauaʻi County Police Department and Honolulu Magazine for defamation, but this lawsuit was dismissed in 2009.

Waldorf Wilson's DNA was tested against the DNA of the perpetrator, and the result was inconclusive. He was never charged with the murders.

== In media ==
The case was featured on season 21, episode 7 of America's Most Wanted. The episode, titled, "Trouble in Paradise," was first aired on November 10, 2007.

== See also ==
- Honolulu Strangler
