= Eloy Elementary School District =

School district in Arizona, United States

Address
- 1011 North Sunshine Boulevard Eloy, Arizona, 85131; United States

District information
- Type: Public
- Grades: PreK–8
- NCES District ID: 0402790

Students and staff
- Teachers: 41.0
- Staff: 70.35

Other information
- Website: www.eloyesd.org

Eloy School District 11 is a school district in Pinal County, Arizona.
