= List of United States state correction agencies =

This is a list of corrections agencies in the states of the United States.

== State adult prison agencies ==
- Alabama Department of Corrections
- Alaska Department of Corrections
- Arizona Department of Corrections, Rehabilitation & Reentry
- Arkansas Department of Correction
- California Department of Corrections and Rehabilitation
- Colorado Department of Corrections
- Connecticut Department of Correction
- Delaware Department of Correction
- District of Columbia Department of Corrections
- Florida Department of Corrections
- Georgia Department of Corrections
- Hawaii Department of Corrections and Rehabilitation
- Idaho Department of Correction
- Illinois Department of Corrections
- Indiana Department of Correction
- Iowa Department of Corrections
- Kansas Department of Corrections
- Kentucky Department of Corrections
- Louisiana Department of Public Safety & Corrections
- Maine Department of Corrections
- Maryland Department of Public Safety and Correctional Services
- Massachusetts Department of Correction
- Michigan Department of Corrections
- Minnesota Department of Corrections
- Mississippi Department of Corrections
- Missouri Department of Corrections
- Montana Department of Corrections
- Nebraska Department of Correctional Services
- Nevada Department of Corrections
- New Hampshire Department of Corrections
- New Jersey Department of Corrections
- New Mexico Corrections Department
- New York State Department of Corrections and Community Supervision
- North Carolina Department of Public Safety
- North Dakota Department of Corrections and Rehabilitation
- Ohio Department of Rehabilitation and Correction
- Oklahoma Department of Corrections
- Oregon Department of Corrections
- Pennsylvania Department of Corrections
- Rhode Island Department of Corrections
- South Carolina Department of Corrections
- South Dakota Department of Corrections
- Tennessee Department of Correction
- Texas Department of Criminal Justice
- Utah Department of Corrections
- Vermont Department of Corrections
- Virginia Department of Corrections
- Washington State Department of Corrections
- West Virginia Division of Corrections and Rehabilitation
- Wisconsin Department of Corrections
- Wyoming Department of Corrections

== State juvenile prison agencies ==
- California Division of Juvenile Justice (defunct)
- Florida Department of Juvenile Justice
- Georgia Department of Juvenile Justice
- Illinois Department of Juvenile Justice
- Kentucky Department of Juvenile Justice
- New Jersey Juvenile Justice Commission
- Ohio Department of Youth Services
- Massachusetts Department of Youth Services
- Minnesota Correctional Facility - Red Wing
- Rhode Island Department of Children, Youth & Families
- Tennessee Department of Children's Services
- Texas Youth Commission
- Utah Division of Juvenile Justice Services

== State parole/probation agencies ==
- Arkansas Department of Community Correction
- Tennessee Board of Parole

== United States Territories ==
- American Samoa Department of Public Safety
- Guam Department of Corrections
- Northern Marianas Department of Corrections
- Puerto Rico Department of Corrections and Rehabilitation
- United States Virgin Islands Department of Justice

== See also ==
- Law enforcement in the United States
