= Halawa Correctional Facility =

Prison in Honolulu, Hawaii, United States

- Interactive map of Halawa Correctional Facility
- Location: 99-902 Moanalua, Aiea, Hawaii; 21°22′24″N 157°53′57″W
- Status: open
- Capacity: 1,124
- Opened: 1977
- Managed by: Hawaii Department of Corrections and Rehabilitation

Halawa Correctional Facility is a state prison in the City and County of Honolulu, Hawaii on the island of Oahu. It is operated by the Hawaii Department of Corrections and Rehabilitation. The prison is in proximity to the communities of Aiea and Halawa.

The prison has two separate facilities: a medium security division for medium-security male prisoners, and a special needs division for both male and female inmates. Originally opened in 1962 as the City and County Halawa Jail, it was transferred to the State in 1977. The prison was expanded in 1987 and remains the largest prison in the State of Hawaii correctional system.

== Notable inmates ==
- Eugene Barrett, serial killer
- Ronald Ching, hit man serving a life sentence for four murders in 1985. He was alleged to be a member of the Company, a predominantly Native Hawaiian criminal organization.
- Kirk Lankford, an American from Kalihi, Hawaii was convicted of murdering a Japanese tourist in Pūpūkea, Hawaii.
- Byran Uyesugi, mass murderer responsible for killing seven people in the 1999 Honolulu shootings.
