= Saguaro Correctional Center =

Prison operated by CoreCivic

Coordinates: 32°48′50″N 111°31′28″W

- Interactive map of Saguaro Correctional Center
- Location: 1250 East Arica Road Eloy, Arizona
- Status: open
- Security class: mixed
- Capacity: 1926
- Opened: 2007
- Managed by: CoreCivic

The Saguaro Correctional Center (SCC) is a private prison for male inmates, owned and operated by CoreCivic located in Eloy, Pinal County, Arizona.

The prison contracts with the Hawaii Department of Corrections and Rehabilitation as well as the Idaho Department of Corrections. As of 2016, the prison, located in the Sonoran Desert, houses the majority of the State of Hawaii's male prison population.

Saguaro, which houses multiple security levels, is on Arizona State Highway 87, halfway between Phoenix and Tucson. Saguaro is adjacent to three other prisons also run by CoreCiviv: the Eloy Detention Center, the La Palma Correctional Facility, and the Red Rock Correctional Center. The nearest cities with food and lodging are Coolidge and Casa Grande.

== History ==
The $95 million Saguaro prison was dedicated on Tuesday, June 26, 2007. The opening meant that the Hawaii Department of Public Safety could consolidate prisoners who had been held in CoreCivic private prisons in Kentucky, Mississippi, and Oklahoma. When the prison opened, 160 employees were hired, and some employees had experience working with Hawaii convicts. The staff members attended a "Hawaiian diversity training class" on the day of the prison's dedication. Louise Grant, the vice president of marketing and communications for CCA, said that the prison was intended to have 300 employees.

In a two-year span, from 2008 to 2010, four Hawaii prisoners died at the hospital after being involved in incidents occurring at Saguaro. 42-year-old Patrick Garcia died in May 2008. 60-year-old James Kendricks died in August 2008. An inmate named Cartel, while being transported to a nearby hospital, died in October 2008. In February 2010, 26-year-old Bronson Nunuha was murdered while under a 22-hour-per-day lockdown. 23-year-old Clifford Medina died on June 8, 2010. As of 2010, three Hawaii prisoners, including at least one from Saguaro, are facing capital murder charges from crimes that prosecutors say were committed in private prisons on the mainland that house Hawaii prisoners.

In 2010, Kat Brady, a coordinator of the Community Alliance on Prisons, argued that the State of Hawaii is not forcing CCA to demonstrate accountability and transparency while the state is paying CCA to operate the prison. During that year, Ron Thompson, the vice president of operations of CCA, responded to Brady's editorial, saying that the prisons are independently audited.

The State of Hawaii annually spends over $60 million per year to house prisoners at Saguaro. As of 2010, the 1,897-bed facility houses 1,871 male prisoners. SCC has stun fences and alarm systems that are designed to prevent escapes and false alarms. It also houses X-ray machines, metal detectors, and security cameras that, according to the prison administration, are "virtually impossible" to destroy. The facility was designed to serve male and female prisoners. CCA arranged for the prison to serve a menu catering to the tastes of Hawaii prisoners. Louise Grant said that the prison observes Hawaii holidays, and the operations will accommodate Hawaiian religious belief practices.
