= Southeast State Correctional Complex =

Medium-security prison in Kentucky, USA

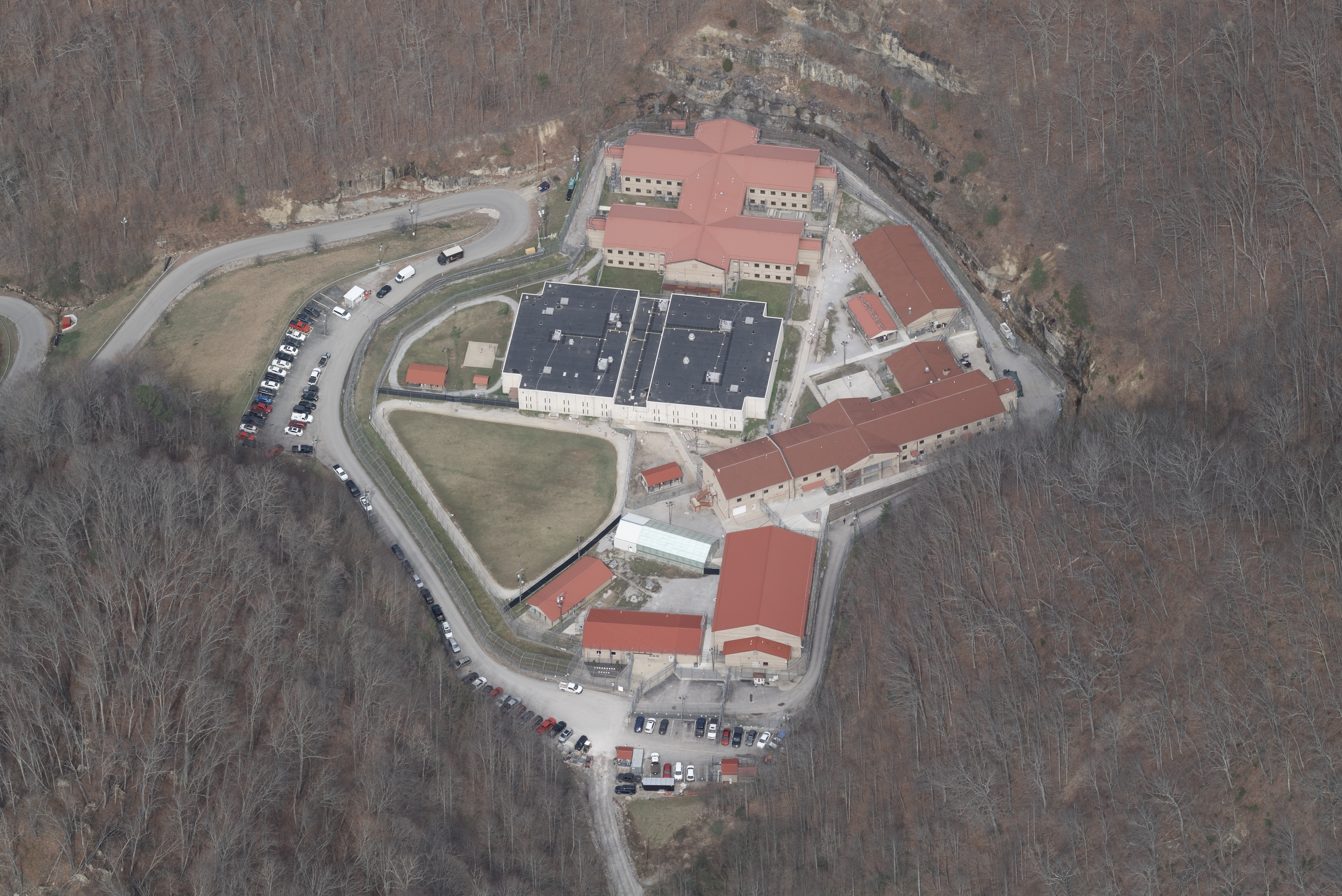

- Location within Kentucky
- Location: 326 Correctional Drive Wheelwright, Kentucky; 37.340059°N 82.717761°W
- Status: open
- Security class: medium
- Capacity: 665
- Opened: 1981 reopened 2020
- Former name: Otter Creek Correctional Center
- Managed by: Kentucky Department of Corrections
- Director: Jacob Bruce

Southeast State Correctional Complex, formerly the Otter Creek Correctional Center, is a medium-security prison located in Wheelwright, Kentucky. The facility is owned by CoreCivic and is operated by the Kentucky Department of Corrections. The prison has housed both male and female inmates at different times, from Kentucky and from Hawaii. The prison opened in 1981.

In 2008, a secretarial employee of the center fatally shot herself in the office of then-warden Joyce Arnold, raising questions about how the weapon had been smuggled in past security. Amid other allegations of mismanagement and poor medical care, Hawaii removed its 168 female inmates from Otter Creek beginning in 2009 over multiple charges of sexual abuse.

Kentucky removed its state inmates from Otter Creek in 2012. The facility remained vacant from 2012 until 2020.

On October 18, 2019, Kentucky Governor Matt Bevin announced that the Commonwealth of Kentucky would enter into a ten-year agreement with CoreCivic to lease and reopen the facility. The prison, which was renamed the Southeast State Correctional Complex, will be operated and staffed by the Kentucky Department of Corrections and will be managed under the same rules and procedures as state owned prisons. In May 2020, Bevin's successor, Andy Beshear, announced that the prison would reopen in September 2020. The facility officially reopened under state management in September 2022 housing male inmates.

== Notable Inmates ==
- Brice Rhodes – A Louisville rapper who was sentenced to life in prison without the possibility of parole in March 2024 for the May 2016 murders of Christopher Jones, 40, and brothers Maurice Gordon, 16, and Larry Ordway, 14. Gordon and Ordway witnessed Rhodes kill Jones, so Rhodes stabbed the brothers to death, burned their bodies, and disposed of them in a dumpster.
