= Red Rock Correctional Center =

Privately owned and operated state prison in Eloy, Arizona

Coordinates: 32°48′28″N 111°31′14″W

Red Rock Correctional Facility
- Interactive map of Red Rock Correctional Facility
- Location: 1750 E Arica Road Eloy, Arizona
- Status: open
- Security class: medium
- Capacity: 1596
- Opened: December 2006
- Managed by: Corrections Corporation of America (since 2006)

The Red Rock Correctional Facility is a medium-security, privately owned and operated state prison for men located in Eloy, Pinal County, Arizona, owned and operated by the Corrections Corporation of America under contract with the Arizona Department of Corrections.

The facility opened in December 2006 and has a working capacity of 1,596 prisoners held at a medium security level.

Before 2014, the facility had housed inmates from California, Alaska, Hawaii, and detainees of the U.S. Marshals Service. Red Rock is adjacent to three other prisons also run by CCA: the Eloy Detention Center, the La Palma Correctional Facility, and the Saguaro Correctional Center.
