= Eloy, Arizona =

City in Arizona, United States

Eloy
- City
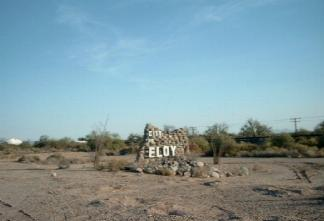

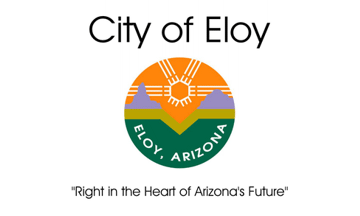
- Flag

- Location of Eloy in Pinal County, Arizona

- Location in the United States Location in Arizona
- Coordinates: 32°45′49″N 111°36′0″W
- Country: United States
- State: Arizona
- County: Pinal
- Incorporated: 1949

Government
  - City Council: Mayor; Andrew Sutton; Vice-Mayor; Sara Curtis; Council Members; Dan Snyder; Sara Curtis; Jose Garcia; Sylvia Guanajuato-Rodriguez; Andrew Sutton

Area
  - Total: 113.75 sq mi (294.60 km^{2})
  - Land: 113.68 sq mi (294.44 km^{2})
  - Water: 0.062 sq mi (0.16 km^{2})
- Elevation: 1,549 ft (472 m)

Population (2020)
  - Total: 15,635
  - Density: 138/sq mi (53.1/km^{2})
- Time zone: UTC-7 (MST (no DST))
- ZIP code: 85131
- Area code: 520
- FIPS code: 04-22360
- GNIS feature ID: 2410433
- Website: City of Eloy

Eloy is a city in Pinal County, Arizona, United States, approximately 50 miles (80 km) northwest of Tucson and about 65 miles (105 km) southeast of Phoenix. According to the 2020 census, the population of the city is 15,635.

== History ==
In 1880, as tracks were being laid for the Southern Pacific Railroad's Sunset Route, a small number of boxcars were used as a camp for railroad workers. It was discovered that cotton could be grown in the area's climate. In 1902, the Southern Pacific Railroad named the area train stop Eloy, an acronym for "East Line Of Yuma". Alternately, there is a legend that the area was initially called "Eloi", after a railroad employee looked around at the barren desert and said, "Eloi, Eloi, lama sabachthani?" (Aramaic and Hebrew for "My God, my God, why hast thou forsaken me?"). A town called Cotton City was established in 1918. In 1919, the newly established post office rejected that name in favor of Eloy. As part of Pinal County, the city incorporated in 1949.

== Geography ==
Eloy has a total area of 113.7 square miles (294.5 km^{2}), all land.

== Demographics ==
Historical population
Census	Pop.	Note	%±
1950	3,580		—
1960	4,899		36.8%
1970	5,381		9.8%
1980	6,240		16.0%
1990	7,211		15.6%
2000	10,375		43.9%
2010	16,631		60.3%
2020	15,635		−6.0%
U.S. Decennial Census

=== 2020 census ===
As of the 2020 census, Eloy had a population of 15,635. The median age was 37.1 years. 15.3% of residents were under the age of 18 and 16.9% of residents were 65 years of age or older. For every 100 females there were 182.3 males, and for every 100 females age 18 and over there were 204.5 males age 18 and over.

0.0% of residents lived in urban areas, while 100.0% lived in rural areas.

There were 3,524 households in Eloy, of which 30.4% had children under the age of 18 living in them. Of all households, 47.2% were married-couple households, 17.9% were households with a male householder and no spouse or partner present, and 27.5% were households with a female householder and no spouse or partner present. About 22.5% of all households were made up of individuals and 12.7% had someone living alone who was 65 years of age or older.

There were 4,213 housing units, of which 16.4% were vacant. The homeowner vacancy rate was 1.9% and the rental vacancy rate was 7.4%.

Racial composition as of the 2020 census
Race	Number	Percent
White	5,399	34.5%
Black or African American	1,152	7.4%
American Indian and Alaska Native	558	3.6%
Asian	225	1.4%
Native Hawaiian and Other Pacific Islander	124	0.8%
Some other race	5,896	37.7%
Two or more races	2,281	14.6%
Hispanic or Latino (of any race)	8,787	56.2%

=== 2011 estimate ===
As of a 2011 estimate, the median income for a household in the city was $26,518, and the median income for a family was $28,494. Males had a median income of $25,295 versus $21,088 for females. The per capita income for the city was $9,194. About 27.9% of families and 31.9% of the population were below the poverty line, including 35.6% of those under age 18 and 24.6% of those aged 65 or over.

== Government ==
The mayor of Eloy is Andrew Sutton whose term runs from 2022 to 2024. He was previously a council member from 2020. The vice mayor is Michelle Trango. The city council consists of the mayor, who serves a two-year term, and six city council members, who each serve four-year terms.

== Economy ==
The largest employer is CoreCivic and CoreCivic prisoners are included in the census. CoreCivic operates four facilities: Eloy Detention Center (opened 1994), Red Rock Correctional Center (opened 2006), Saguaro Correctional Center (opened 2007), and La Palma Correctional Facility (opened 2008). As of 2020, CoreCivic's correctional centers house detainees from states including Hawaii, Nevada, Idaho, and Kansas.

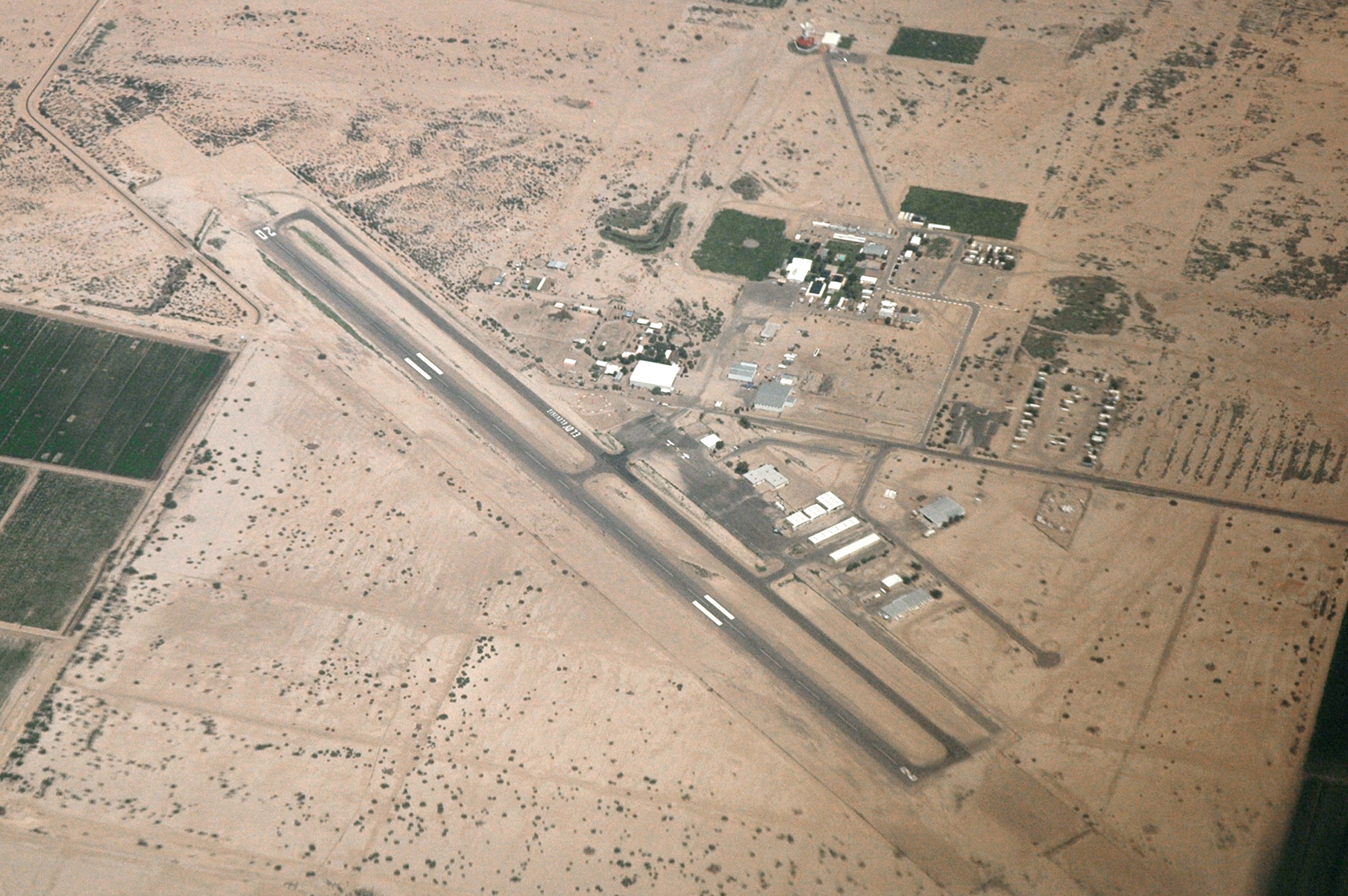
Aerial view of the Eloy Municipal Airport, looking east

According to Eloy's 2023 Annual Comprehensive Financial Report, the top employers in the city are:

#	Employer	Employees
1	CoreCivic	1,546
2	Eloy Elementary School District	155
3	Republic Plastics	142
4	City of Eloy	121
5	Schuff Steel	113
6	Otto Plastics Arizona, LLC	80
7	Skydive Arizona	70
8	TravelCenters of America	65
9	Santa Cruz Valley Union High School District	55

== Transportation ==
The closest major airports to Eloy are Phoenix Sky Harbor International Airport and Tucson International Airport. Casa Grande Shuttle provides an airport shuttle to Sky Harbor.

The Eloy Municipal Airport is a non-towered airport located in Eloy.

Greyhound serves Eloy.

== Culture ==
Eloy is home to the world's largest skydive drop zone, operated by Skydive Arizona, and bills itself as the skydiving capital of the world. Two parachute manufacturers are based in Eloy, including Firebird USA and Sun Path Products.

The city is home to the Robson Ranch Golf Club with an 18-hole, par-72 golf course. The Casa Grande Valley Historical Society & Museum was founded in 1964 and holds a collection of more than 50,000 artifacts. Picacho Peak State Park is located 10 miles southeast of Eloy. It is the site of the only Civil War battle in Arizona; the battle is re-enacted annually.

Eloy was the town showcased during Season 2, Episode 19 of the 1950s police drama "The Man Behind the Badge". The name of the episode was "The Case of the Wild West" and it was first shown on Saturday, May 14, 1955.

== Education ==
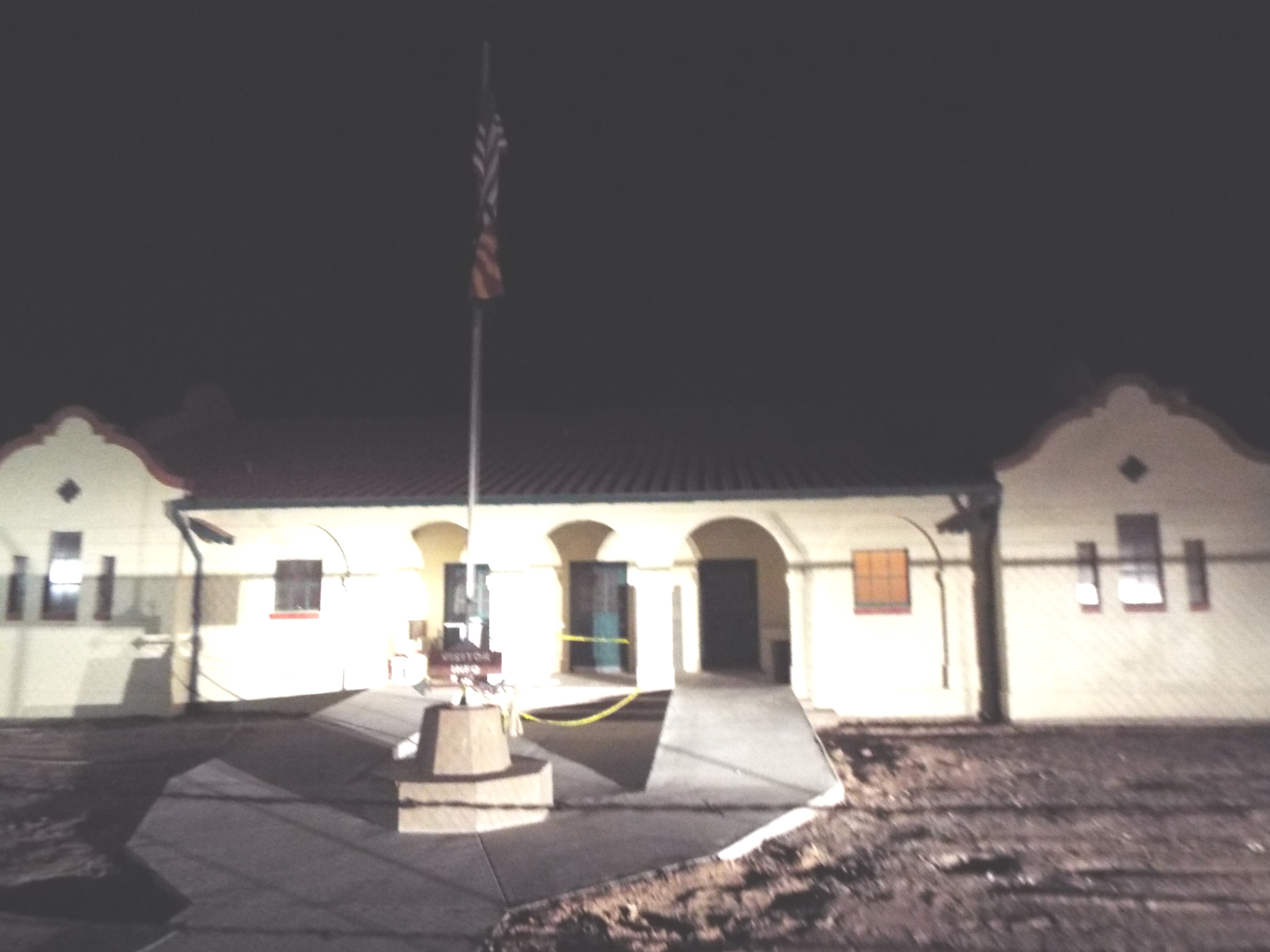
Historic Santa Cruz School, built in 1913

The Eloy Elementary School District provides elementary education in grades kindergarten through 8th grade through its four schools:

- Curiel Primary School (grades kindergarten through 3rd)
- Eloy Intermediate School (grades 4th through 6th)
- Eloy Junior High School (grades 7th and 8th)
- Toltec Elementary School (grades 4th through 8th)

Eloy has one public high school, Santa Cruz Valley Union High School, and some residents attend the nearby Casa Grande Union High School.

== Notable people ==
- Mossy Cade – former professional football player
- Anna Maria Chávez – former CEO of Girl Scouts of the USA
- Levi Jones – former professional football player
- Art Malone – former professional football player
- Benny Malone – former professional football player
- Ricky Nelson – former professional baseball player
- Paul Powell – former professional baseball player
- Jeff Provenzano – professional skydiver
- Dominic Evans – musician
