= Emerald Triangle =

Cannabis-growing region of northern California, USA

- Region of California
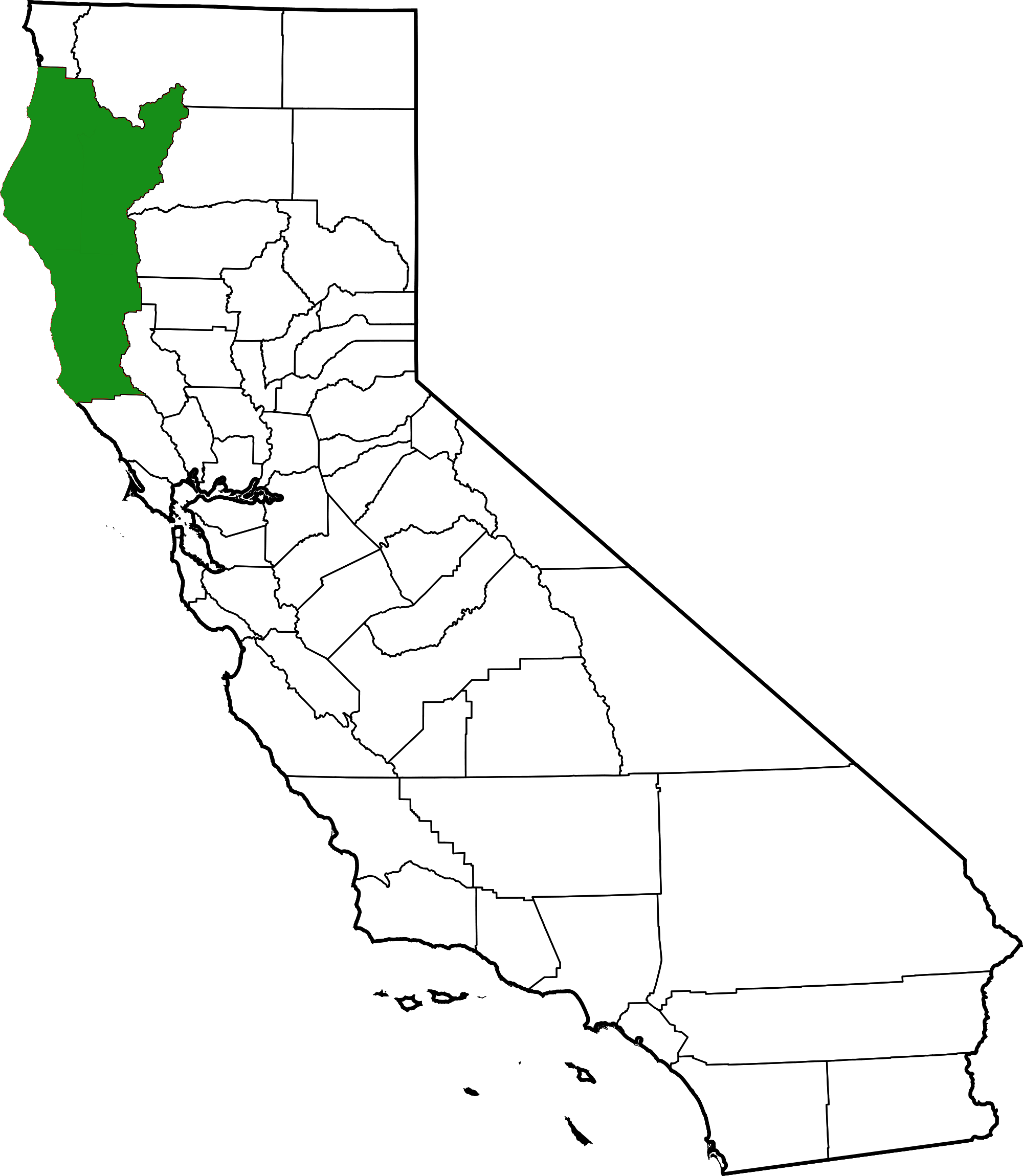
- Map of the Emerald Triangle
- Coordinates: 40.0°N 123.5°W
- Country: United States
- State: California
- Counties: Mendocino County, Humboldt County, Trinity County
- Largest city: Eureka

Area
  - Land: 10,253.58 sq mi (26,556.7 km^{2})

Population (April 1, 2010)
  - Total: 236,250
  - Estimate (2019): 234,592
  - Density: 23/sq mi (8.9/km^{2})

The Emerald Triangle is a region in Northern California that derives its name from being the largest cannabis-producing region in the United States. The region includes three counties in an upside-down triangular configuration:

- Humboldt County, on the coast
- Trinity County, inland
- Mendocino County, to the south

Growers have been cultivating Cannabis plants in this region since the 1960s, during San Francisco's Summer of Love. Growing cannabis in the Emerald Triangle is considered a way of life, and the locals believe that everyone living in this region is either directly or indirectly reliant on the cannabis industry. The industry exploded in the region with the passage of California Proposition 215 (1996), which legalized the use of cannabis for medicinal purposes in California. The passage of Proposition 64 in 2016 legalized the general sale and distribution of cannabis.

== History ==
Historically, the area's remote location and limited law enforcement presence made it a primary site for illicit cannabis cultivation. Over time, the region developed a reputation for producing cannabis with distinct flavor profiles and high cannabinoid concentrations.

In 1984, Humboldt residents filed a federal lawsuit claiming they had been subject to illegal surveillance by U-2 high-altitude reconnaissance aircraft deployed by the California-based multiagency task force started the year prior, the Campaign Against Marijuana Planting.

As of 2023, Humboldt County has the largest cannabis farming industry in the Emerald Triangle. While the largest legal pot farm in the county was 8 acres (3.2 ha), a 2021 survey found the median pot farm size to be 0.22 acres (0.09 ha).

== Population ==
The total population in the Emerald Triangle was estimated at 235,489 by the U.S. Census Bureau in 2025. The majority of the population is widely spread throughout the woody hills and mountains that make up the area. With an area of 11,138 square miles, the Emerald Triangle population density is 21/mi^{2}.

In this sparsely populated region, the largest urban area is the city of Eureka in Humboldt County with an estimated population of 25,304 people. The second and third largest cities, by far larger than any other cities in the region, are Arcata (also in Humboldt), with 19,047 people, and Ukiah (in Mendocino), with 16,068 people.

== Environmental concerns ==
There is an environmental impact from outdoor cannabis production in the Emerald Triangle, which is largely unregulated. These effects include illegal damming, diversion and taking of water from streams (especially during summer), and also pesticide-laden runoff into streams, all of which may degrade critical salmon fisheries. Clearcutting and roadbuilding for the cannabis plantations can also degrade the environment and endanger salmon. The grows often occur illegally on public land.

== In popular culture ==
The Lookouts, founded in 1985 by Larry Livermore, who also founded Lookout! Records, were Tré Cool's first band. The punk rock band was named for the fire lookout at Iron Peak in Mendocino County, which led local marijuana growers to threaten to burn down Livermore's house for bringing too much publicity to their hilly isolated region of the Emerald Triangle near Spyrock. The band wrote many songs about the surrounding area on Mendocino Homeland and Spy Rock Road, an album named for the road lined with marijuana grows that leads to Iron Peak. Livermore also wrote Spy Rock Memories, a 2013 book about his time living off the grid in the heart of the Emerald Triangle.

Humboldt County is a 2008 comedy-drama about a medical school dropout who drives north to Humboldt County to live on a pot farm.

Discovery Channel's Pot Cops, a 2013 docuseries, followed the Humboldt County Sheriff's Office's Marijuana Enforcement Team in 2013.

The 2013 book Humboldt: Life on America's Marijuana Frontier by Emily Brady, is written about the marijuana industry in Humboldt County and the surrounding Emerald Triangle.

Welcome to Willits is a 2016 horror movie which takes place in the Emerald Triangle.

Amazon Prime's Budding Prospects was a 2017 pilot episode for a series based on the 1984 novel of the same name by T. C. Boyle that was set in Mendocino County in the 1980s. Amazon released the pilot but did not greenlight the series.

Netflix's 2018 true crime television series Murder Mountain examines the high rate of missing people and murders in Humboldt County. The show covers the history of illegal marijuana farming including the relationship of local farmers and local authorities as the area attempts to transition into a legal cannabis industry.

The 2020 film Freeland is about a longtime Humboldt County marijuana grower, played by Krisha Fairchild, growing illegally despite the availability of the legal market.

The 2021 documentary Lady Buds, produced by Gravitas Ventures, about women who work in the marijuana industry in Northern California, is being developed into a scripted comedy feature film and a non-scripted series.

Hulu's 2021 docuseries Sasquatch is based on the murder of pot growers in Mendocino County in the 1990s, purportedly perpetrated by Bigfoot.

The 2021 crime podcast Dark Woods, produced by Dick Wolf and set in Humboldt County that includes a trespass marijuana grow on public land, is currently being developed by Universal Television for a TV adaptation.

== See also ==
- Sequoia County, California
