= Special agent =

Criminal investigator

In the United States, a special agent is an official title used to refer to certain investigators or detectives of federal, military, tribal, or state agencies who primarily serve in criminal investigatory positions. Additionally, some special agents operate in criminal intelligence, counterterrorism, or counterintelligence-based roles as well, with one or all of these roles occasionally taking precedence over criminal investigatory tasks.

Within the American federal law enforcement system, dozens of federal agencies employ federal law enforcement officers (LEOs), each with different criteria pertaining to the use of the titles special agent and agent. Most criminal investigators employed by the U.S. Department of Defense and its component departments typically utilize the title of "special agent."

Most people holding the title of "special agent" are LEOs under state and/or federal law (with some also being dual intelligence operatives such as with the FBI). These LEOs are distinctly empowered to conduct both major and minor criminal investigations and hold arrest authority. While not all federal LEOs are "special agents," nearly all special agents—with very few exceptions—are duly-sworn LEOs. This holds true at the state level as well, with nearly all special agents of state agencies being sworn LEOs.

In intelligence usage, "agent" may also refer to a human source or human "asset" who is recruited, trained, controlled, and employed to obtain and report information. However, within law enforcement agencies, these types of sources are often referred to as informants, confidential informants (CI—not to be confused with counterintelligence), or confidential human sources (CHS).

== Federal government ==
Within the U.S. government, the title of "special agent" primarily refers to the criminal investigator (GS-1811) series position. However, the title is also concurrently used for general investigator (GS-1810) job series and the intelligence specialist in the GS-0132 job series according to the Office of Personnel Management (OPM) handbook. The vast majority of special agents are GS-1811 (or equivalent) criminal investigators. Special agents typically have at a minimum an undergraduate degree.

- GS-1811: Criminal investigator (primary special agent occupation within the federal government)
- GS-1810: General investigator
- GS-0132: Intelligence
- FS-2501: Foreign Service criminal investigator (Department of State's Diplomatic Security Service)

=== Federal agencies ===
Most federal agencies, including the following, employ some type of special agent, investigator, or background investigator:

- Central Intelligence Agency (CIA)
  - CIA Office of Inspector General
- Department of Agriculture (USDA)
  - United States Forest Service
    - Law Enforcement and Investigations
  - Office of Inspector General (USDA OIG)
- Department of Commerce (USDOC)
  - National Oceanic and Atmospheric Administration (NOAA)
  - Office of Export Enforcement (OEE)
  - Office of Inspector General (DOC OIG)
  - Office of Security (OSY)
- Department of Defense (DOD)
  - Department of the Air Force Office of Special Investigations (DAFOSI)
  - Defense Finance and Accounting Service (DFAS)
  - Defense Counterintelligence and Security Agency (DCSA)
  - Defense Intelligence Agency (DIA)
  - Defense Logistics Agency (DLA)
    - DLA Police
    - Office of the Inspector General
  - National Security Agency (NSA)
    - NSA Office of Inspector General
  - Naval Criminal Investigative Service (NCIS)
  - Department of Defense Office of Inspector General (DoD OIG)
    - Defense Criminal Investigative Service (DCIS)
  - Pentagon Force Protection Agency (PFPA)
  - United States Army Counterintelligence (Army CI)
  - United States Army Criminal Investigation Division (CID)
  - United States Marine Corps Criminal Investigation Division (USMC CID)
- Department of Education (ED)
  - Office of Inspector General (ED OIG)
- Department of Health and Human Services (HHS)
  - Food and Drug Administration (FDA)
    - Office of Criminal Investigations (OCI)
  - Office of Inspector General (HHS OIG)
- Department of Homeland Security (DHS)
  - Coast Guard Investigative Service (CGIS)
  - Citizenship and Immigration Services (USCIS)
  - Customs and Border Protection (CBP)
  - Federal Protective Service (FPS)
  - Immigration and Customs Enforcement (ICE)
  - Homeland Security Investigations (HSI)
  - Office of Inspector General (DHS-OIG)
  - Transportation Security Administration (TSA)
  - United States Secret Service (USSS)
- Department of the Interior (DOI)
  - Bureau of Indian Affairs Police (BIA)
  - Bureau of Land Management (BLM)
  - National Park Service (NPS)
    - United States Park Police (USPP)
  - Office of Inspector General (DOI OIG)
  - United States Fish and Wildlife Service (USFWS)
- Department of Justice (DOJ)
  - Bureau of Alcohol, Tobacco, Firearms and Explosives (ATF)
  - Drug Enforcement Administration (DEA)
  - Federal Bureau of Investigation (FBI)
  - Federal Bureau of Prisons (BOP)
  - Office of Inspector General (DOJ OIG)
  - United States Marshals Service (USMS)
- Department of Energy (DOE)
  - National Nuclear Security Administration
- United States Department of Labor (DOL)
  - Department of Labor, Office of Inspector General (DOL OIG)
- Department of State
  - Diplomatic Security Service (DSS)
  - Office of Inspector General (STATE OIG)
- Department of Transportation (DOT)
  - Federal Aviation Administration (FAA)
  - Federal Motor Carrier Safety Administration (FMCSA)
  - Office of Inspector General for the Department of Transportation (DOT OIG)
- Department of the Treasury
  - Alcohol and Tobacco Tax and Trade Bureau (TTB)
  - Bureau of Engraving and Printing Police
  - IRS Criminal Investigation (IRS-CI)
  - Treasury Inspector General for Tax Administration (TIGTA)
  - United States Mint
    - United States Mint Police
- Environmental Protection Agency (EPA)
  - Office of Enforcement and Compliance Assurance (OECA)
  - Office of Inspector General (EPA OIG)
- National Aeronautics and Space Administration (NASA)
  - Office of Inspector General
  - Office of Protective Services
- Office of Personnel Management
  - Office of Inspector General (OPM OIG)
- United States Postal Service (USPS)
  - United States Postal Inspection Service (USPIS)
  - Office of Inspector General (USPS OIG)
- Federal Reserve System
  - Federal Reserve Police
- Other
  - All 73 federal Offices of Inspector General (OIG), including those listed individually above

=== Training for the federal criminal investigator ===
Federal law enforcement training can be divided into various categories, the most common being basic, agency-specific basic (ASB), advanced/specialized, and agency-advanced/specialized. To operate safely and effectively, U.S. special agents and criminal investigators must possess skills and knowledge regarding criminal and civil law and procedure, enforcement operations, physical techniques, and technical equipment. They must also be physically fit. While possession of a college degree can aid in obtaining employment in this profession, only extensive training provided at specialized facilities, combined with on-the-job training, can provide the skills and knowledge needed to perform the duties of a federal criminal investigator. As of 2012, there were 13,913 FBI agents, as of 2016, there were approximately 6,500 ICE–Homeland Security Investigations (HSI) agents, and as of 2011, there were 4,890 DEA agents in the United States.

=== Criminal investigators and the use of the term "special agent" ===
Not all federal criminal investigators are called special agents. Some federal agencies use the terms "special agent" and "criminal investigator" interchangeably. Other federal agencies use different titles for the same 1811 criminal investigative job series. Series 1811 criminal investigators for the U.S. Marshals are called deputy marshals. Series 1811 criminal investigators for the U.S. Postal Inspection Service are called postal inspectors. These inspectors were originally called surveyors, but in 1801 their title was changed to special agent. In 1880, the U.S. Congress created the position of chief postal inspector and renamed these special agents to postal inspectors. The first special agents in the United States were appointed in 1791 when the secretary of the treasury was authorized to employ special agents for the purpose of examining the accounts and books of the Collectors of Customs. The position of special treasury agent was created, and until 1860 submitted reports to the Department of Treasury, through the Collectors of Customs in the Customs District in which they were employed.

== State, county, municipal, and tribal governments ==
The terms "special agent" and "agent" are also used by various specialized state level law enforcement agencies to refer to their officers, including the North Carolina State Bureau of Investigation (NCSBI), the Kentucky Department of Criminal Investigation (DCI), the Washington State Gambling Commission, many agencies inside the California Department of Justice such as the California Bureau of Investigation, the California Bureau of Firearms, the California Bureau of Gambling Control, the California Bureau of Forensic Services and the California Bureau of Medi-Cal Fraud & Elder Abuse, the Tennessee Bureau of Investigation (TBI), the Arkansas State Police (ASP) Criminal Investigations Division and many others. These agencies may be a part of a State Bureau of Investigation (which is usually a part of an Attorney General's Office or a state level Government Department) or a State Police Agency (which is again itself a part of a state Department of Public Safety or a Department of Justice).

Also, Maryland has criminal investigators who are employed by the state attorney. These investigators are called special investigators. As with special agents, these special investigators are authorized to conduct investigations, make arrests, carry firearms or other weapons, and carry a metallic badge.

== In popular culture ==
- Special agents, particularly those within the FBI, have been depicted in popular entertainment for years.
- The title "Assistant Special Agent in Charge" and its acronym "ASAC" (/ˈeɪsæk/) are stated frequently throughout the TV series Breaking Bad. For example, in Season 1 through Season 4, both DEA Special Agent Hank Schrader and local entrepreneur Gus Fring are shown to be friendly with Hank's boss, ASAC George Merkert, and in Season 4 Episode 12 "End Times", Steve Gomez tells Dennis the "ASAC" is being pressured to search Gus's laundry for drugs. In Season 5, Hank – who is proud to have been promoted to the job vacated by his ousted boss – repeatedly chants "ASAC Schrader" to his baby niece Holly.
- In the TV series White Collar, Peter Burke is the "Special Agent in Charge" (promoted from assistant Special Agent in Charge at the end of Season 6) and the head of the Manhattan White Collar Division.
- In the TV series Criminal Minds several of the Behavioral Analysis Unit members are Supervisory Special Agents.
- In the TV series The X-Files, the title "Special Agent" is given to both Fox Mulder and Dana Scully of the Federal Bureau of Investigation. The title is referenced by them numerous times throughout each episode.
- The main character from the TV series Twin Peaks is FBI Special Agent Dale Cooper, and also, other FBI special agents make numerous cameos throughout the series, and its prequel movie, Twin Peaks: Fire Walk with Me.
- "Dick Barton – Special Agent" was the subject of radio programs in the 1940s and later TV and film productions.
- In the TV series NCIS, the character Special Agent Anthony DiNozzo constantly introduces himself as "Very Special Agent Anthony DiNozzo" in an attempt to be charming.
- In the TV series Mr. Robot the character Dominique "Dom" DiPierro, the FBI "ASAC", appeared in the final three seasons.

== See also ==
- List of United States federal law enforcement agencies
- Bureau of Alcohol, Tobacco, Firearms and Explosives
- Detective
- Drug Enforcement Administration
- Federal Bureau of Investigation
- Central Intelligence Agency
- Inspector
- Investigator (disambiguation)
- IRS Criminal Investigation
- Law enforcement agency
- Police rank
- Society of Former Special Agents of the Federal Bureau of Investigation
- State bureau of investigation
- State police
- U.S. Immigration and Customs Enforcement
- United States Marshals Service
- United States Secret Service
- Spy agent
