= Campaign Against Marijuana Planting =

Multi-agency law enforcement task force

- Active: 1983–present
- Country: United States
- Agency: Office of the Attorney General; California Department of Justice; California Bureau of Narcotic Enforcement (1983–2012)
- Type: multi-agency law enforcement task force
- Role: Law enforcement; marijuana eradication
- Operations jurisdiction: California
- Headquarters: Sacramento, California
- Abbreviation: CAMP

Website
- CAMP Website

The Campaign Against Marijuana Planting (CAMP) is a multi-agency law enforcement task force managed by the California Department of Justice and composed of local, state and federal agencies organized expressly to eradicate illegal cannabis cultivation and trafficking in California. Since its establishment in 1983, more than 110 agencies having participated, making CAMP one of the largest law enforcement task forces in the United States.

CAMP's stated primary objectives include "reducing the supply of marijuana to the illegal drug trade by eradicating the large marijuana crop sites; increasing public and environmental safety by removing marijuana growers from public and private lands; investigating indoor growing operations; deterring potential growers; and promoting public information and education on marijuana."

CAMP agents are divided into five teams covering Northern, Central and Southern California regions. Headed by the California Department of Justice, CAMP includes local, state and federal agencies that work to eradicate illegal indoor and outdoor cannabis cultivation and trafficking throughout California. The U.S. Drug Enforcement Administration, Bureau of Land Management, U.S. Forest Service, California National Guard, California State Parks, California Department of Fish and Wildlife, California Highway Patrol and dozens of local police and sheriff departments from across the state have participated in the program.

The California Bureau of Narcotic Enforcement, California Office of Emergency Services, Bureau of Alcohol, Tobacco and Firearms, California National Guard Counterdrug Task Force, California Department of Forestry, National Park Service, Internal Revenue Service, California Department of Transportation, Bureau of Indian Affairs, FBI, US Customs, US Marshals Service, California Franchise Tax Board, California Department of Corrections SERT, California Bureau of Investigation, Bureau of Major Frauds, Bureau of Medi-Cal Fraud, California Department of Agriculture, California Department of Motor Vehicles, Sixth United States Army Joint Task Force, Fifth United States Army Joint Task Force, United States Marine Corps, United States Air Force Civil Air Patrol, United States Coast Guard, United States Navy, Western States Information Network, and California National Guard "Team Wolf" have all participated in past CAMP operations.

From 1988 to 1996, the C-RAT (CAMP Reconnaissance Arrest Team) program, headquartered in Redding, trained specialized teams of agents run by California Highway Patrol traffic officers and in its first years also consisted of agents from, California Bureau of Narcotic Enforcement, California Department of Corrections SERT, US Forest Service, Bureau of Land Management, and ATF. Upon request from local sheriffs, C-RAT teams conducted surveillance, documented garden cultivation and arrested suspects on marijuana grow sites.

Some small communities in Northern California, especially in the Emerald Triangle region, have complained about CAMP's presence in general and their aerial surveillance operations in particular. The effectiveness of CAMP's aerial surveillance in the 1980s, had been credited by some with forcing growers indoors in the 1990s. Also in response to stronger asset forfeiture laws, larger trespass grows on federal land, especially national forests, began to proliferate and CAMP in turn started to focus on the largest grows on federal land.

== Rank structure ==
CAMP Rank	Department of Justice Title
CAMP Special Agent in Charge	Special Agent in Charge
Operations Commander	Special Agent Supervisor
Regional Operations Commander	Special Agent
Assistant Regional Operations Commander/Team Leader	Special Agent
CAMP Officer	Officer

== List of former CAMP Incident Commanders/Special Agents in Charge ==
- Bob Elsburg – Incident Commander (1983)
- Jack Beecham – Incident Commander (1984–1989)
- Carolyn McIntyre – Special Agent in Charge (1990)
- Dale Ferranto – Special Agent in Charge (1991–1995)
- Dave Mansfield – Operations Commander (1991–1993)
- Walt Kaiser – Operations Commander (1994–1997)
- Mitch Brown – Special Agent in Charge (1996–1997)
- JT Taylor – Special Agent in Charge (1998–1999)
- Gil Van Attenhoven – Operations Commander (1998–1999)
- Rick Oules – Special Agent in Charge (2000–2001)
- Sonya Arriaga-Barna – Operations Commander (2000–2003)
- Ron Gravitt – Special Agent in Charge (2002–2003)
- Dave Tresmontan – Acting Chief (2003–2004)
- James Parker – Senior Agent in Charge (2004–2005)
- Val R. Jimenez – Operations Commander (2003–2005)
- Michael Johnson – Operations Commander (2005–2009)
- Jack Nelsen – Operations Commander (2019–2020)

== Compassionate Use Act ==
In 1996, California voters approved ballot proposition 215, the Compassionate Use Act, legalizing the medical use of cannabis. As a consequence, CAMP's commander, a California law-enforcement officer, was specifically ordered by the state attorney general to respect the state's medical marijuana laws in the course of his duties. Consequently, CAMP shifted priority to large commercial grow operations on public lands, and coordinates with county authorities so as not to interfere with medical grow operations known to them, which in any event tend to be smaller. Nevertheless, such operations are still against Federal law and are subject to action by the DEA.

While the influence of CAMP has waned since the Compassionate Use Act and later decriminalization of marijuana, there is interest at the state level regarding valid growing permits and environmental concerns. As a result, CAMP is utilized as a policing body, in accordance with the DEA. Yearly CAMP reports, published by the California Department of Justice, Bureau of Narcotic Enforcement (BNE) are available online through Humboldt State University's Special Collections. Beginning in 1983, the annual reports detail the organizational structure and names of individual participants, a summary of the season's activities, tactics, and mention of special successes, trends and hazards.

== Eradication and Prevention of Illicit Cannabis ==
In October 2022, California Attorney General Rob Bonta announced that CAMP, a seasonal eradication program, will transition into a year-round task force called the Eradication and Prevention of Illicit Cannabis, or EPIC. The agencies that worked with CAMP in 2022 include the California Department of Justice, California Department of Fish and Wildlife, Bureau of Land Management, U.S. Forest Service, National Park Service, Drug Enforcement Administration, California National Guard Counter Drug Task Force, Central Valley HIDTA, California State Parks, Environmental Protection Agency, and numerous local law enforcement agencies. EPIC works closely with the Governor's Unified Cannabis Enforcement Taskforce, which is jointly run by the Department of Cannabis Control and California Department of Fish and Wildlife, and coordinated by the Cal OES Homeland Security Division, as well as the California State Parks' Cannabis Watershed Protection Program Special Enforcement Teams.

== In popular culture ==
- The first national television coverage of marijuana eradication in Humboldt County, including footage of a raid by CAMP's predecessor the Northern California Sinsemilla Task Force, aired on CBS Evening News May 16, 1979.
- In the promotional material for the 1986 film Quiet Cool, CAMP had a flyer with advice for what to do if you encounter a marijuana grow in the forest, a situation that occurs in the film.
- A 1987 comedy sci-fi feature film, filmed and produced in Garberville, "Ganjasaurus Rex," parodied CAMP and their enforcement in Southern Humboldt County.
- CAMP was featured in "Home Grown High", a 1989 episode of 48 Hours, as well at ABC News.
- Thomas Pynchon's 1990 novel Vineland depicts a fictional version of CAMP as one of the main antagonists.
- CAMP was also a character in three books in the mid-1980s: T. C. Boyle's 1984 book Budding Prospects, Steve Chapple's 1984 book Outlaws in Babylon: Shocking True Stories on the Marijuana Frontier and Ray Raphael's 1985 book Cash Crop: An American Dream.
- The June 1993 National Geographic Magazine issue featured CAMP teams in Mendocino County.
- Real Stories of the Highway Patrol followed Humboldt County's CAMP team in 1995 and two episodes aired in February 1996.
- The German Television USA news magazine Weltspiegel produced a 1995 episode on CAMP operations filmed in Mendocino County.
- 60 Minutes II ran a segment title "The Patton of Pot" on then CAMP Commander Sonya Barna, which aired on CBS in 2001.
- DEA Special Agent in Charge Javier Peña was the lead DEA agent for CAMP from 2004 to 2008, while he ran the San Francisco DEA Office.
- Discovery Channel's Pot Cops followed the Humboldt County Drug Task Force, who works closely with CAMP.
- National Geographic Channel's Wild Justice followed wardens from the then California Department of Fish and Game, and multiple episodes followed the game wardens and local sheriff deputies on marijuana raids on National Forest land, conducted in conjunction with CAMP.
- The 2013 book Humboldt: Life on America's Marijuana Frontier by Emily Brady, written about the marijuana industry in Humboldt County and the surrounding Emerald Triangle, makes multiple references to CAMP enforcement operations in Humboldt County.
- Hulu's Sasquatch and Netflix's Murder Mountain both feature footage of CAMP in the 1980s and interview marijuana growers and former CAMP officers including CAMP Commander Dale Ferranto, CAMP Officer Mark Saiz and CAMP Officer and former Humboldt County Sheriff Mike Downey.
- Larry Livermore, a longtime resident of the Spy Rock area of Mendocino County, wrote about CAMP in Lookout! Magazine, his 2013 book Spy Rock Memories, and multiple songs for his band The Lookouts.
- CAMP has been referenced in multiple songs by Humboldt County musicians, including Darryl Cherney and Rod Deal & The I-Deals.
- For decades, the Garberville radio station KMUD has broadcast the location of law enforcement activities, including CAMP, to warn local residents.
- In 1985, CAMP coined Emerald Triangle as a name for Humboldt, Mendocino, and Trinity counties in Northern California.

== See also ==
- Gonzales v. Raich
- War on drugs
- Office of National Drug Control Policy
