= List of State of California enterprise computing systems =

This is a partial list of State of California enterprise computing systems:

== Automated licensing information and report tracking system ==
Variant names:	ALIRTS
Department:	Office of Statewide Health Planning and Development.
Function:	Tracks licensing information of health care facilities in the State of California. This includes clinics, acute care hospitals, and other in-patent facilities. Does not cover dentists or other private medical practices.
Details:	none
Exists as of:	2007

== Altaris CAD ==
Variant names:	Sometimes referred to as PSI CAD, PSI being the company that designed the system. Northrop Grumman purchased PSI.
Department:	Resources Agency, California Department of Forestry and Fire Protection (CDF).
Function:	Computer-assisted dispatch system manufactured by Northrop Grumman.
Details:	Each dispatching center has a stand-alone system. Systems are customizable to meet local needs. Replaces a system called CalCAD.
Summary of stated purpose:	To manage on-duty staff and pending requests for service. The system records incidents, resources, and aids in the efficient use of staff. It includes stored geographic information including maps, street centerlines, routing based on centerlines, and addresses.
Exists as of:	2006

== Automated firearms system ==
Department:	Bureau of Criminal Identification and Information, California Department of Justice.
Function:	Tracks the serial numbers of every firearm owned by government, observed by law enforcement, seized, destroyed, held in evidence, reported stolen, recovered, voluntarily registered, or handled by a firearms dealer (except most long guns).
Details:	Data are collected from field checks of firearms.
Summary of stated purpose:	Identifies lost or stolen firearms and connects firearms with persons.
Exists as of:	1990

== CalCAD ==
Obsolete California Department of Forestry and Fire Protection DOS-based computer-aided dispatch system replaced by Altaris CAD in 2005. No geographic verification was built in. Uploads data from Ranger Units to statewide CAIRS system for analysis of trends and costs.

== California All Incident Reporting System (CAIRS) ==
Department:	Resources Agency, California Department of Forestry and Fire Protection (CDF)
Function:	Tracks statistical information on fires and other requests for service so the data can be analyzed in preventing fires.
Details:	This is a web-based system provided by a vendor named CompuPro. Rollout was set for Summer 2006.
Summary of stated purpose:	It provides reports usable by all parts of the CDF organization to analyze trends and improve service. The primary purpose was to comply with a regulatory requirement (California Health and Safety Code Section 13110.5) intended to reduce costs and loss of life from fire and other events.
Exists as of:	2006

== California new employee registry ==
Department:	Employment Development Department (EDD)
Function:	stores the names, addresses, and Social Security numbers of every new employee in the state.
Details:	Every employer is required to report the above facts for every new employee to the EDD. Data are uploaded to a similar national system.
Summary of stated purpose:	Used to track employment statistics and to locate persons in arrears on child support payments.
Exists as of:	2008

== Criminal justice information system ==
Variant name:	CI&I
Department:	Bureau of Criminal Identification and Information, California Department of Justice.
Function:	Enterprise system that stores records about persons including fingerprints and criminal history information.
Details:	System is designed to reveal minimal information about a query unless the person making the query asks for more details. Also used to collect and associate innuendo of criminal wrongdoing with persons who have no convictions.
Summary of stated purpose:	Allows law enforcement and criminal justice agencies to review a person's criminal history. Used to check applicants for employment at cities, counties, and special districts for criminal convictions. Used to check the conviction records of individuals who work in jobs with minors.
Exists as of:	1989

== Driver license automated record system ==
Variant name:	DL, DL automated record system
Department:	Department of Motor Vehicles (DMV)
Function:	Allows the DMV to manage the issuance and renewal of driver licenses and California Identification Cards.
Details:	System uses a Series 1 or RS6000 terminal.
Summary of stated purpose:	Manages driver license records to comply with legislated rules.
Exists as of:	2006

== Medical information reporting for California ==
Variant name:	MIRCal
Department:	Office of Statewide Health Planning and Development.
Function:	Tracks in-patient hospital and emergency room demographic data for California hospitals.
Details:	none
Exists as of:	2007

== Passage assessment database ==
Department:	Resources Agency, Department of Fish and Game (DFG)
Function:	Records the presence of obstructions to fish passage in about 3,000 coastal streams.
Details:	Funded by DFG but operated by a public-private partnership.
Summary of stated purpose:	Creates a catalog of obstructions to the path of spawning fish in coastal streams so the obstructions can be removed over time. Feeds planning and development processes in coastal communities so new bridges and roads are fish friendly. This feeds a process to remove obstructions to fish and also loads geographic information systems to map them.
Exists as of:	2006

== Precursor compliance system ==
Department:	Clandestine Laboratories Coordinator, Bureau of Narcotic Enforcement (BNE), California Department of Justice
Function:	Evaluates the traffic in precursor chemicals of potential use in making illegal drugs.
Details:	none
Summary of stated purpose:	Manages system of permit issuance to businesses handling such chemicals.
Exists as of:	1992

== State contract and procurement registration system ==
Variant name:	SCPRS
Department:	Department of General Services (DoGS)
Function:	Satisfies legislative requirement to track contracts over $5,000.
Details:	Does contract tracking for state purchases of $5,000 and up. Tracks and identifies vendors who are offering services to state agencies or have successfully bid on state contracts. Includes some public access functions: extracted spreadsheets show large lists of contracts and reveal the winners.
Summary of stated purpose:	Summary of stated purpose: Links potential contractors, and contractors, with buyers from state government agencies.
Exists as of:	2007

== Statewide integrated traffic record systems ==
Variant name:	SWITRS
Department:	California Highway Patrol
Function:	undetermined
Details:	none
Summary of stated purpose:	none
Exists as of:	2006

== Structures maintenance system ==
Department:	California Department of Transportation (Caltrans)
Function:	Tracks a catalog of information about bridges and viaducts on State-maintained roadways.
Details:	Stores information including bridge number, county, route, bridge name. May store information about planned maintenance, earthquake risk, and earthquake retrofit plans.
Summary of stated purpose:	none
Exists as of:	1989

== Traffic accident surveillance and analysis system ==
Variant name:	TASAS
Department:	Department of Transportation (Caltrans)
Function:	Collects data on car crashes and allows analysis of them.
Details:	Includes portions called Accident Data Base (AXDB) and query system called TASAS Selective Accident Retrieval (TSAR).
Summary of stated purpose:	To comply with federal law, which requires statistical analysis of auto accidents in order to reduce the occurrence of collisions.
Exists as of:	2006

== Vehicle registration automated record systems ==
Variant names:	VR, VR automated record system
Department:	Department of Motor Vehicles (DMV)
Function:	manages vessel and vehicle registration as required by legislation.
Details:	System uses a Series 1 or RS6000 terminal.
Summary of stated purpose:	none
Exists as of:	2006

== See also ==
- Enterprise Information System
- Legacy system
