= Can of Pork =

Compilation album by Various artists
- Released: April 1992
- Recorded: July 10, 1990-January 1992 at Art of Ears Studios in San Francisco, California; March 1992 at Dancing Dog Studios in Emeryville, California; January 1992 at Westbeach Recorders in Hollywood
- Genres: Punk rock, ska punk, pop punk
- Length: 70:18
- Label: Lookout (LK 44)
- Producers: Andy Ernst, Kevin Army, Fat Mike

Lookout Records chronology
The Thing That Ate Floyd (1989)	Can of Pork (1992)	Punk U.S.A. (1994)

Can of Pork is a compilation album of various punk rock artists. It was released as two 12-inch vinyl records or one CD in April 1992 by Lookout Records (LK 44). The vinyl version has a booklet of lyrics and photography and the CD version has information on contacting the bands and a detailed description of the compilation's production.

== Background, recording and production ==
In August 1990, Lookout Records' owner and co-founder, Larry Livermore, and Chris Appelgren, founder of the Puddle fanzine, decided to make a compilation album of various artists. Appelgren contacted groups such as The Offspring, Cringer and Jawbreaker in October 1990, asking them if they wanted to record a song for a compilation album, all of whom declined the offer. In December, Livermore met Pat Hynes, a U.C. student, artist and the founder and publisher of the fanzine 2+2=5, and hired him to work for Lookout and asked him to be involved with the production of Can of Pork. They then contacted bands such as The Wynona Riders, Fifteen and The Mr. T Experience in February 1991 and asked them to record songs for the upcoming compilation, all of whom accepted. A deadline was set for April, which was changed a number of times for 11 months.

Livermore, Hynes and Appelgren came up with working titles for the compilation such as The Thing That Ate David (a reference to the previous Lookout compilation The Thing That Ate Floyd (1989)), Lookout Avenue and This Is Why We Are the Smart Punx, all of which they decided they were not satisfied with. In June, they found out that David Hayes, the owner of the contemporary punk label Very Small Records, was to release a double compilation that year titled Very Small World. Because of this, they debated canceling the project, but ultimately decided to continue. From December 1991 to February 1992, Livermore was in England and left the production of the compilation to Hynes and Appelgren. The same month, Hynes and Appelgren contacted the bands they had decided on and went to record the compilation with Andy Ernst and Kevin Army at Art of Ears Studios in San Francisco. After the recording process was finished, they settled on the title Can of Pork and Hynes began drawing the cover art. Can of Pork was mastered by John Golden at K-Disc in Hollywood.

== Release and reception ==
Professional ratings
Review scores
Source	Rating
Allmusic	2.5/5 stars

After a year and a half of production, Can of Pork was released on two 12-inch records or one CD in April 1992 by Lookout Records (LK 44). The vinyl version has a booklet with lyrics and photography, while the CD version has only information on contacting the bands and a detailed description of Can of Pork's production. Allmusic rates the compilation 2 and a half out of 5 stars.

== Track listing ==
Side one
No.	Title	Contributing artist	Length
1.	"Bad Trip"	Pounded Clown	1:54
2.	"Trinidad"	Brent's T.V.	1:40
3.	"Promise Is a Promise"	Lizards	1:48
4.	"Evolution"	Engage	5:31
5.	"Redneck Woman from Planet Mars"	Horny Mormons	1:50
6.	"Get a Job"	One Man Running	1:49
7.	"Kick Me in the Head" (written by Larry Livermore, Kain Kong, Tré Cool and Billie Joe Armstrong)	The Lookouts	2:56

Side two
No.	Title	Contributing artist	Length
8.	"Void"	Anger Means	2:11
9.	"Piano Song from Hell"	Krupted Peasant Farmers	3:41
10.	"Whiners"	Preachers That Lie	1:39
11.	"Sidetrack"	Porcelain Boys	2:51
12.	"Hole"	Drippy Drawers	3:02
13.	"Noble End"	Lagwagon	1:40
14.	"Martian"	Rudiments	2:41
15.	"The Future"	Rice	0:13

Side three
No.	Title	Contributing artist	Length
16.	"Learning How to Smile"	Blatz	1:51
17.	"Parents Are Really Weird"	Jack Acid	1:39
18.	"17 Reasons" (written by Jeff Ott)	Fifteen	3:47
19.	"College Town"	Jüke	2:18
20.	"T-Shirt Commercial"	Mystery Experience	1:12
21.	"Berthe"	The Vagrants	5:02
22.	"Benicia by the Bay" (lyrics written by Aaron Cometbus; music written by Pinhead Gunpowder)	Pinhead Gunpowder	1:47

Side four
No.	Title	Contributing artist	Length
23.	"North Berkeley" (written by Tim Armstrong and Matt Freeman)	Downfall	2:25
24.	"Break"	The Wynona Riders	2:47
25.	"Dysfunction"	Spitboy	1:44
26.	"Why Quit?"	Good Grief	2:05
27.	"Other Day"	Freefall	3:24
28.	"Two"	Sawhorse	3:31
29.	"Vive le France"	The Mr. T Experience	1:20
Total length:			70:18

== Personnel ==
The Lookouts

- Larry Livermore - lead vocals, rhythm guitar
- Kain Kong - Bass guitar, backing vocals
- Tré Cool - drums, backing vocals
- Billie Joe Armstrong - lead guitar, backing vocals

Lagwagon

- Joey Cape - vocals
- Chris Flippin - guitar
- Shawn Dewey - guitar
- Jesse Buglione - bass guitar
- Derrick Plourde - drums

Blatz

- Jesse Luscious - lead vocals
- Robert Eggplant - guitar, backing vocals
- Anna Joy - vocals
- Annie Lalania - vocals
- Marshall Stax - bass guitar
- Joey Perales - drums

Fifteen

- Jeff Ott - lead vocals, guitar
- Jack Curran - bass guitar
- Mark Moreno - drums

Pinhead Gunpowder

- Aaron Cometbus - drums
- Mike Kirsch - lead vocals, guitar
- Bill Schneider - bass guitar, backing vocals
- Billie Joe Armstrong - guitar, backing vocals

Downfall

- Tim Armstrong - lead vocals
- Matt Freeman - bass guitar, backing vocals
- Dave Mello - drums
- Pat Mello - guitar, backing vocals
- Jason Hammon - guitar

The Wynona Riders

- Ron "Skip" Greer - lead vocals
- Eric Matson - guitar, backing vocals
- Jack Cheeze - bass guitar
- Rico Martinez - drums

The Mr. T Experience

- Dr. Frank - lead vocals, guitar
- Jon Von Zelowitz - guitar, backing vocals
- Aaron Rubin - bass guitar
- Alex Laipeneiks - drums

=== Production ===
- Andy Ernst and Kevin Army - producers, engineers, mixing
- Larry Livermore, Pat Hynes and Chris Applecore - executive producers
- John Golden - mastering
- Pat Hynes - cover art
- Chris Applecore - artwork
- Herriman and Wordburger - booklet artwork

== See also ==
- List of punk compilation albums
- 1992 in music

== Notes ==
1. * The only song recorded at Dancing Dog Studios was "Benicia by the Bay" by Pinhead Gunpowder.
1. * "Noble End" by Lagwagon was the only song on Can of Pork produced by Fat Mike and the only one recorded at Westbeach Recorders.
