= Spyrock, California =

Unincorporated community in California, United States

- Unincorporated community
- Location in California Spyrock, California (the United States)
- Coordinates: 39°52′36″N 123°26′38″W
- Country: United States
- State: California
- County: Mendocino
- Elevation: 850 ft (259 m)

Spyrock (formerly, Spy Rock) is an unincorporated community of ranches in Mendocino County, California, United States. It is located around Spyrock Road, which runs east of Highway 101 to the Eel River and Northwestern Pacific Railroad.

It is named after Spy Rock, a 540 feet (160 m) landmark hill on the east side of the river, and The Wildlands Conservancy operates the 5,832-acre (2,360 ha) Spyrock Reserve in the area.

A post office operated at Spyrock from 1910 to 1911, and from 1915 to 1967. The currently closed Spy Rock Elementary School located on Spy Rock Road is in Laytonville Unified school district, although Spy Rock previously had its own school district.

There was a station on the railroad named Spy Rock which until 1914 was named Redwine.

In 1982, a Petroglyph site beside Spy Rock Road was investigated which provided the first evidence of complex rock art boulders in the western United States.

The Spy Rock Road album by The Lookouts was named after the road by Larry Livermore who lived in Spy Rock in the 1980s.

Spy Rock features prominently in the 2021 Hulu docuseries Sasquatch.
