= Sasquatch (TV series) =

2021 American true crime docuseries

- Genre: True crime
- Directed by: Joshua Rofé
- Music by: H. Scott Salinas
- Country of origin: United States
- Original language: English
- No. of episodes: 3

Production
- Executive producers: Steven J. Berger; Jay Duplass; Mark Duplass; Zach Cregger; Mel Eslyn; David Holthouse; Joshua Rofé
- Producer: M. Elizabeth Hughes Lukas Cox
- Cinematography: Ronan Killeen
- Animator: Drew Christie
- Running time: 46 minutes
- Production companies: Number 19; Duplass Brothers Productions

Original release
- Network: Hulu
- Release: April 20, 2021

Sasquatch is an American true crime documentary television series that premiered on Hulu on April 20, 2021, with a South by Southwest pre-release screen on March 16, 2021.

== Plot summary ==
The show begins with investigative journalist David Holthouse's recalling a story he heard in 1993 on a cannabis farm in Mendocino County, part of the Emerald Triangle in Northern California. Holthouse heard someone say that Bigfoot has killed three people on a nearby cannabis farm. Throughout the show Holthouse talks with marijuana growers and law enforcement in Mendocino County, who tell him about possible connections to the Hells Angels biker gang and Spy Rock Road, a lawless marijuana growing area of Mendocino County near Laytonville. These interviews reveal the larger problem of missing persons in the Emerald Triangle.

== Cast ==
- David Holthouse – Self – Investigative Journalist
- Ghostdance – Self – Cannabis Farmer
- Christopher Dienstag – Self – Former Cannabis Farmer
- Razor – Self – Cannabis Farmer
- Molly Sinoway – Self – Back to the Lander
- Bob Gimlin – Self – Legendary Sasquatch Hunter
- Charles Carlson – Self – Back to the Lander
- Larry Livermore – Self – Back to the Lander
- Diana – Self – Niece of Hugo Olea-Lopez
- Wayne and Georges – Themselves – Wayne Stapleton, Georges Hemingway – Life Partners/Sasquatch Hunters
- Bob Heironimus – Self – Self-Proclaimed Sasquatch Hoaxer
- Brian Regal – Self – Author of Searching for Sasquatch
- Luis Espinoza – Self – Lead Investigator, Hugo Olea-Lopez Case
- Dale Ferranto – Self – CAMP Commander
- Tom Allman – Self – Mendocino County Sheriff
- James Fay – Self – Sasquatch Hunter
- Jerry Hein – Self – Sasquatch Hunter
- Mike Sinoway – Self – Attorney
- Mark Saiz – Self – CAMP Officer
- Jim Murphy – Self – Retired Police Officer
- Jeffrey Meldrum – Self – Professor of Anatomy and Anthropology

== Episodes ==
No.	Title	Original release date
1	"Grabbing at Smoke"	April 20, 2021
2	"Spy Rock"	April 20, 2021
3	"Monsters Among Us"	April 20, 2021

== Reception ==
Sasquatch has received mostly positive reviews with critics praising the pacing, animated recreations, and true sense of danger. Richard Roeper of the Chicago Sun-Times wrote, "director Joshua Rofe makes great use of sparse, graphic-novel type re-enactment animation to augment the usual assortment of interviews and archival footage." One of the few negative reviews came from Eileen Jones of Jacobin, who wrote that it consisted of "entirely unserious, exploitative hijinks" which contrasted with the serious subject matter.

== See also ==
- Spyrock, California
- Murder Mountain (TV series)
- Emerald Triangle
- Sequoia County, California
