= Lawrence Livermore =

Lawrence Livermore may refer to:

- Larry Livermore (Lawrence Hayes, born 1947), American musician, record producer and author
- Lawrence Livermore National Laboratory, in Livermore, California, United States, co-founded by Ernest Lawrence
