= KBI =

KBI may refer to:

- Budōkan (karate), or Karate Budokan International, a recognized style of Karate
- Kansas Bureau of Investigation, the criminal investigative arm of the state of Kansas
- Kentucky Department of Criminal Investigation, formerly known as the Kentucky Bureau of Investigation, a Kentucky investigative law enforcement agency
- Knowledge Based Industrial, a company focused on the management of knowledge in a Knowledge economy
