= Bureau of Investigation (disambiguation) =

Bureau of Investigation is the precursor to the Federal Bureau of Investigation.

Bureau of Investigation may also refer to:

- The historical national investigative agency of Taiwan, the Bureau of Investigation
- Central Bureau of Investigation (India)
- The Alaskan Bureau of Investigation, a division of the Alaskan State Troopers
- State bureau of investigation
