= Mendocino Homeland =

EP by The Lookouts
- Released: 1989
- Recorded: 1989 at Sergay's Sound Emporium in Berkeley, California
- Genre: Punk rock, hardcore punk
- Label: Lookout! (LK 028)
- Producer: Kevin Army and The Lookouts

The Lookouts chronology
Spy Rock Road (1989)	Mendocino Homeland (1989)	IV (1990)

Mendocino Homeland is an extended play by the American punk rock band The Lookouts. It was released in 1989 through vocalist/guitarist Larry Livermore's label Lookout! Records.

== Track listing ==
All songs written by Kain Kong, except where noted.

1. "I Saw Her Standing There" - 2:37
2. "Judgment Day" (Tré Cool) - 3:09
3. "Relijion Ain't Kül" - 2:59
4. "Mendocino Homeland" - 2:35

== Personnel ==
- Larry Livermore - lead vocals, guitar
- Kain Kong - bass, backing vocals
- Tré Cool - drums, lead vocals on "Judgment Day"

Production

- Kevin Army - producer, engineer, mixing
- The Lookouts - producers
- John Golden - mastering
