= One Planet One People =

Studio album by the Lookouts
- Released: 1987
- Recorded: October 1986
- Studios: Dangerous Rhythm (Oakland, California)
- Genres: Hardcore punk, punk rock
- Length: 26:29
- Label: Lookout! (LK 001)
- Producers: Kevin Army, the Lookouts

The Lookouts chronology
One Planet One People (1987)	Spy Rock Road (1989)

One Planet One People is the debut studio album by the American punk rock band the Lookouts. It was released in 1987 through Lookout! Records and was the first ever release on the label. One Planet One People is the first recording featuring Tré Cool of Green Day.

== Track listing ==
All tracks are written by Larry Livermore, except where noted.

No.	Title	Length
1.	"Why Don't You Die?"	0:41
2.	"The Mushroom Is Exploding" (written by Tré Cool)	0:43
3.	"Friends of Mine" (written by Kain Kong)	2:25
4.	"Mendocino County"	0:51
5.	"Downtown"	1:32
6.	"Catatonic Society" (written by Kong)	2:09
7.	"The Last Time" (written by Mick Jagger and Keith Richards; originally performed by The Rolling Stones)	0:58
8.	"Death"	0:44
9.	"I Wanna Love You (But You Make Me Sick)"	1:38
10.	"Recycled Love"	1:43
11.	"It's All Over Now, Baby Blue" (written and originally performed by Bob Dylan)	1:22
12.	"Miss Trendy Burrhead" (lyrics written by Linda Lou Wessman)	1:18
13.	"My Mom Smokes Pot"	0:42
14.	"Nazi Dreams" (written by Kong)	1:11
15.	"Fuck Religion"	0:55
16.	"Thank the Lord" (written by Kong)	0:45
17.	"Fucked Up Kid" (lyrics written by Richard Rochester)	0:37
18.	"CAMP Get Out"	0:44
19.	"Fourth Reich (Nazi Amerika)"	0:53
20.	"Don't Cry for Nicaragua"	1:21
21.	"One Planet One People"	2:16
22.	"Sometimes"	1:12
Total length:		26:29

== Personnel ==
- Larry Livermore - lead vocals, guitar
- Kain Kong - bass, backing vocals, lead vocals on "Catatonic Society"
- Tré Cool - drums, lead vocals on "The Mushroom Is Exploding"

Production

- Kevin Army - producer, engineer
- The Lookouts - producers
- Davy Normal - front cover art
- Larry Livermore - back cover art
- John Golden - mastering
