= Bob Ross: Happy Accidents, Betrayal & Greed =

- Promotional poster
- Directed by: Joshua Rofé
- Produced by: Steven J. Berger; Divya D'Souza; Ben Falcone; Melissa McCarthy; Joshua Rofé; Lukas Cox
- Starring: Bob Ross; Steve Ross; Vicky Ross; John Thamm; Dana Jester
- Cinematography: Ronan Killeen
- Edited by: Allan Duso
- Music by: H. Scott Salinas
- Production company: Netflix
- Distributed by: Netflix
- Release date: August 25, 2021
- Running time: 92 minutes
- Country: United States
- Language: English

Bob Ross: Happy Accidents, Betrayal & Greed is a 2021 American biographical documentary film produced and distributed by Netflix and directed by Joshua Rofé. The film offers a look into the life and career of painter and television host Bob Ross, and the battle for his business empire. The film was released on August 25, 2021.

== Reception ==
On the review aggregator website Rotten Tomatoes, 79% of 29 critics' reviews are positive, with an average rating of 6.7/10. The website's consensus reads: "A brisk and engaging documentary, Bob Ross: Happy Accidents, Betrayal & Greed humanizes its subject while thoughtfully exploring how his talent became a brand, making it an enlightening and worthwhile watch for fans of his legacy." Metacritic, which uses a weighted average, assigned the film a score of 55 out of 100, based on 10 critics, indicating "mixed or average" reviews.
