= The Mortician (TV series) =

2025 American TV documentary series

- Genre: Documentary
- Directed by: Joshua Rofé
- Music by: Daniel Pemberton; Adem Ilhan
- Country of origin: United States
- Original language: English
- No. of episodes: 3

Production
- Executive producers: Joshua Rofé; Steven J. Berger; Jonah Hill; Matt Dines; Nancy Abraham; Lisa Heller; Tina Nguyen
- Producers: M. Elizabeth Hughes; Alison Goodwin
- Cinematography: Ronan Killeen
- Editors: Morgan Hanner; Azin Samari; Caitlyn Hynes
- Running time: 54-59 minutes
- Production companies: HBO Documentary Films; Number 19; Strong Baby

Original release
- Network: HBO
- Release: June 1 – June 15, 2025

The Mortician is a 2025 documentary series directed and produced by Joshua Rofé. It follows a family run funeral home, with cremation services led by son David Sconce, as they betray public trust exploiting families and deceased to maximize profits.

It premiered on June 1, 2025, on HBO.

== Premise ==
The documentary series explores the Lamb Funeral Home, which betrayed public trust by exploiting families and the deceased in order to maximize profits. Sconce was convicted and sentenced to five years for mutilating corpses, holding mass cremations and hiring hitmen for rival morticians. The series features interviews with Sconce, journalists Ashley Dunn and David Geary; and Lamb Funeral Home victims, among others.

== Episodes ==
No.	Title	Directed by	Original release date	U.S. viewers (millions)
1	"Episode One"	Joshua Rofé	June 1, 2025	0.166
2	"Episode Two"	Joshua Rofé	June 8, 2025	0.185
3	"Episode Three"	Joshua Rofé	June 15, 2025	0.186

== Production ==
Jonah Hill serves as an executive producer under his Strong Baby banner.

== Reception ==
=== Critical reception ===
On the review aggregator website Rotten Tomatoes, The Mortician has an approval rating of 86% based on 7 critics' reviews. Metacritic, which uses a weighted average, gave a score of 68 out of 100 based on 4 critics, indicating "generally favorable" reviews.

Joel Keller of Decider suggests viewing the series, writing: "The Mortician effectively shows just how ghoulish the things David Sconce did to people’s loved ones really was, and does so mostly through Sconce’s own words." Peter Martin of ScreenAnarchy wrote: "No matter your personal feelings and beliefs about what happens after we die, The Mortician will touch you and provoke a visceral reaction. Because death awaits us all."

=== Viewership ===
The series became HBO's most-watched documentary series in over five years, surpassing Chimp Crazy, Pee-wee as Himself and Love Has Won: The Cult of Mother God.
