= Lorena (TV series) =

American TV series

- Genre: True crime Documentary
- Directed by: Joshua Rofé
- Starring: Lorena Bobbitt; John Wayne Bobbitt; David Berman; Kim Gandy; Janna Bisutti; Becki Rinker
- Country of origin: United States
- Original language: English
- No. of seasons: 1
- No. of episodes: 4

Production
- Executive producers: Jordan Peele; Win Rosenfeld; Joshua Rofé; Steven J. Berger; Jenna Santoianni; Tom Lesinski
- Production companies: Monkeypaw Productions; Sonar Entertainment; Number 19

Original release
- Network: Amazon Prime Video
- Release: February 15, 2019

Lorena is a 2019 American true-crime docuseries about the 1993 assault and subsequent court case involving John and Lorena Bobbitt. The four-part series premiered on February 15, 2019 on Amazon Prime Video. It was directed by Joshua Rofé who also served as an executive producer alongside Jordan Peele, Win Rosenfeld, Steven J. Berger, Jenna Santoianni, and Tom Lesinski.

== Premise ==
On June 23, 1993, Lorena Bobbitt cut off her husband John Bobbitt’s penis with an eight-inch (20 cm) carving knife from the kitchen counter while he was asleep in bed. She left the apartment with the severed appendage and drove her car to the nail salon where she worked. She threw the penis out of the car window into a roadside field during her commute. It was later found and re-attached. After her arrest, Lorena accused John of ongoing domestic violence and marital rape. The story and trial became a headline worldwide due to the 24-hour news cycle.

Lorena features interviews with both Lorena and John as they detail the events leading up to the night of the incident, the trial and aftermath in their personal lives. It is described by Amazon as "a groundbreaking re-investigation of the deep moral issues and painful human tragedies buried at the heart of this infamous American scandal. Lost in the tabloid coverage and jokes was the opportunity for a national discussion on domestic and sexual assault in America."

== Production ==
On April 5, 2018, it was announced that Amazon Prime Video had given the production a series order consisting of four episodes. The series was set to be directed by Joshua Rofé who was also expected to executive produce alongside Jordan Peele, Win Rosenfeld, Steven J. Berger, Jenna Santoianni, and Tom Lesinski. Production companies involved with the series were slated to consist of Monkeypaw Productions, Sonar Entertainment, and Number 19. On January 8, 2019, it was announced that the series would premiere on February 15, 2019.

== Release ==
On January 8, 2019, the first trailer for the series was released.

The series held its official premiere on January 29, 2019, during the 2019 Sundance Film Festival as a part of the festival's Special Events section of screenings.

== Episodes ==
No.	Title	Directed by	Original release date
1	"The Night Of"	Joshua Rofé	February 15, 2019
2	"A Woman in Trouble"	Joshua Rofé	February 15, 2019
3	"An Irresistible Impulse"	Joshua Rofé	February 15, 2019
4	"The Cycle of Abuse"	Joshua Rofé	February 15, 2019

== Reception ==
On review aggregator Rotten Tomatoes, it holds an approval rating of 82% based on 45 reviews, with an average rating of 7.33/10. The website's critical consensus reads, "Fascinating and frustrating, Lorena's ample footage and fresh perspective on a long-mocked moment provide welcome context and vindication to the woman at its center — even if its reenactments don't quite measure up." Metacritic, which uses a weighted average, assigned the series a score of 75 out of 100 based on 18 critics, indicating "generally favorable reviews".
