= State bureau of investigation =

State-level detective agency of U.S. states

A state bureau of investigation (SBI) is a state-level detective agency in the United States. They are plainclothes agencies that usually investigate criminal cases involving the state and/or multiple jurisdictions. They also typically provide technical support to local agencies in the form of laboratory and/or record services, or to directly assist in investigations at the local agency's request.

An SBI is a state's equivalent to the Federal Bureau of Investigation, but can include investigative jurisdiction similar to other federal law enforcement agencies. SBIs investigate a range of cases assigned to them by state laws and typically report to their state's attorney general, or in some cases, directly to their state's governor.

SBIs can also exist either independently or within a state Department of Public Safety or Department of Justice (an agency coordinating and/or controlling various state-level law enforcement agencies) or a state police force.

== Specific state criminal investigative agencies ==
- Alabama
  - Alabama Law Enforcement Agency
  - Alabama Highway Patrol
- Alaska
  - Alaska Bureau of Investigation (ABI)
- Arizona
  - Arizona Attorney General's Office – Criminal Division
- Arkansas
  - Arkansas Department of Public Safety
    - Arkansas State Police
      - Criminal Investigations
      - Crimes Against Children
- California
  - California Department of Justice (CA DOJ) – Special Agents assigned to various investigative bureaus:
    - Bureau of Investigation
    - Bureau of Firearms
    - Bureau of Gambling Control
    - Bureau of Forensic Services
    - Bureau of Medi-Cal Fraud & Elder Abuse
- Colorado
  - Colorado Bureau of Investigation
- Connecticut
  - Connecticut Bureau of Criminal Investigations
- Delaware
  - Delaware State Police
    - Criminal Investigations Units
    - Special Investigations Section
  - Delaware Department of Justice
    - Office of the Attorney General – Special Investigators
- Florida
  - Florida Department of Law Enforcement (SBI)
  - Florida Highway Patrol
- Georgia
  - Georgia Bureau of Investigation
- Hawaii
  - Hawaii Department of the Attorney General – Investigations Division
  - Hawaii Department of Law Enforcement
    - Sheriff Division
    - Criminal Investigation Division
    - Office of Homeland Security, Intelligence Enforcement Unit
- Idaho
  - Idaho State Police – Investigation Division
- Illinois
  - Illinois State Police – Division of Criminal Investigation
- Indiana
  - Indiana State Police – Criminal Investigation Division
- Iowa
  - Iowa Department of Public Safety
    - Division of Criminal Investigation
- Kansas
  - Kansas Bureau of Investigation
- Kentucky
  - Kentucky Department of Criminal Investigation
- Louisiana
  - Louisiana State Police
- Maine
  - Maine State Police
  - Office of the Maine Attorney General Investigation Division
- Maryland
  - Maryland State Police
- Massachusetts
  - Massachusetts State Police — State Police Detective Units
- Michigan
  - Michigan State Police
  - Michigan Department of Attorney General Criminal Division
  - Michigan Department of Attorney General Financial Crimes Division
- Minnesota
  - Minnesota Department of Public Safety
    - Minnesota Bureau of Criminal Apprehension
- Mississippi
  - Mississippi Bureau of Investigation
- Missouri
  - Missouri Department of Public Safety
- Montana
  - Montana Department of Justice – Division of Criminal Investigations
- Nebraska
  - Nebraska State Patrol – Investigative Services
- Nevada
  - Nevada Investigation Division
- New Hampshire
  - New Hampshire Department of Safety – Division of State Police – Investigative Services Bureau
- New Jersey
  - New Jersey State Police – Criminal Investigations Bureau
  - New Jersey State Detectives
- New Mexico
  - New Mexico State Police – Investigations Bureau
  - Organized Crime Commission
- New York
  - New York State Police – Bureau of Criminal Investigations
- North Carolina
  - North Carolina State Bureau of Investigation
- North Dakota
  - North Dakota Office of the Attorney General – North Dakota Bureau of Criminal Investigation (Attorney General's website)
- Ohio
  - Ohio Attorney General – Ohio Bureau of Criminal Investigation
- Oklahoma
  - Oklahoma State Bureau of Investigation, an independent agency
- Oregon
  - Oregon Department of Justice – Criminal Justice Division
- Pennsylvania
  - Pennsylvania Office of the Attorney General – Bureau of Criminal Investigations
  - Pennsylvania State Police – Bureau of Criminal Investigation
- Puerto Rico
  - Puerto Rico Department of Justice
  - Puerto Rico Department of Public Safety
    - Puerto Rico Police
    - Puerto Rico Special Investigations Bureau
- Rhode Island
  - Rhode Island State Police – Detective Bureau
- South Carolina
  - South Carolina Law Enforcement Division (SLED), an independent agency
  - South Carolina Department of Public Safety – Highway Patrol Division
  - South Carolina Department of Public Health – Bureau of Drug Control
  - South Carolina Department of Revenue – Criminal Investigation
- South Dakota
  - South Dakota Division of Criminal Investigation
- Tennessee
  - Tennessee Bureau of Investigation, an independent agency
- Texas
  - Texas Department of Public Safety
    - Texas Rangers
    - Criminal Investigations Division
  - Texas Attorney General's Office – Law Enforcement Division
- Utah
  - Utah Department of Public Safety – State Bureau of Investigation
- Vermont
  - Vermont State Police – Bureau of Criminal Investigations
- Virginia
  - Virginia State Police – Bureau of Criminal Investigation
- Washington
  - Washington State Patrol – Criminal Investigations Division
- West Virginia
  - West Virginia State Police – Bureau of Criminal Investigations
- Wisconsin
  - Wisconsin Department of Justice – Division of Criminal Investigation
- Wyoming
  - Wyoming Division of Criminal Investigation

== See also ==
- Law enforcement in the United States
- State (United States)
- Federal Bureau of Investigation
- Department of public safety
- Landeskriminalamt – German states
- Civil Police (Brazil) – Brazilian state detective agencies
- Ministry of State Security - Has many provincial sub agencies such as Hainan State Security Department
