= Joshua Rofé =

American director

- Occupations: Director, producer
- Years active: 2002–present

Joshua Rofé is an American film director and producer. He has directed the films The Gray in Between (2002), Lost for Life (2013), Swift Current (2016), and Bob Ross: Happy Accidents, Betrayal & Greed (2021). Rofé also directed the television series Lorena (2019), Sasquatch (2021) and The Mortician (2025).

== Career ==
Rofé has directed the feature-length documentaries Lost for Life, which had its world premiere at AFI Docs in June 2013, focusing on juveniles serving life sentences in prison, and their victims families. Swift Current focusing on Sheldon Kennedy's activism for victims of abuse. and Bob Ross: Happy Accidents, Betrayal & Greed focusing on Bob Ross's life and career, and his battle for his business empire, produced by Melissa McCarthy for Netflix.

Rofé has directed the television series Lorena for Amazon Prime Video, focusing on John and Lorena Bobbitt, executive produced by Jordan Peele. Sasquatch for Hulu, focusing on journalist David Holthouse as he attempts to solve a homicide which is claimed to be the work of a mythical creature, executive produced by Mark Duplass, Jay Duplass and Zach Cregger. and The Mortician for HBO Documentary Films, focusing on a funeral home betraying the publics trust exploiting families and deceased to maximize profits, executive produced by Jonah Hill.

He has served as an executive producer on Kids Behind Bars: Life or Parole for A&E. and Out There: Crimes of the Paranormal for Hulu.

== Filmography ==
=== Films ===
Year	Title	Director	Producer
2013	Lost for Life	Yes	Yes
2015	Swift Current	Yes	Yes
2021	Bob Ross: Happy Accidents, Betrayal & Greed	Yes	Yes

=== Television ===
Year(s)	Title	Director	Producer
2019	Lorena	Yes	Executive producer
2019-21	Kids Behind Bars: Life or Parole	No	Executive producer
2021	Sasquatch	Yes	Executive producer
2024	Out There: Crimes of the Paranormal	No	Executive producer
2025	The Mortician	Yes	Executive producer
