= California Bureau of Gambling Control =

State law enforcement agency

Bureau of Gambling Control
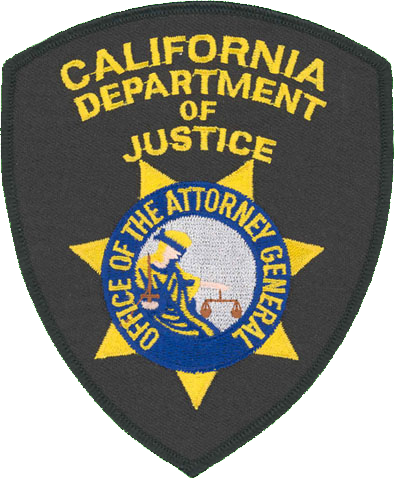
- CA DOJ Shoulder Patch

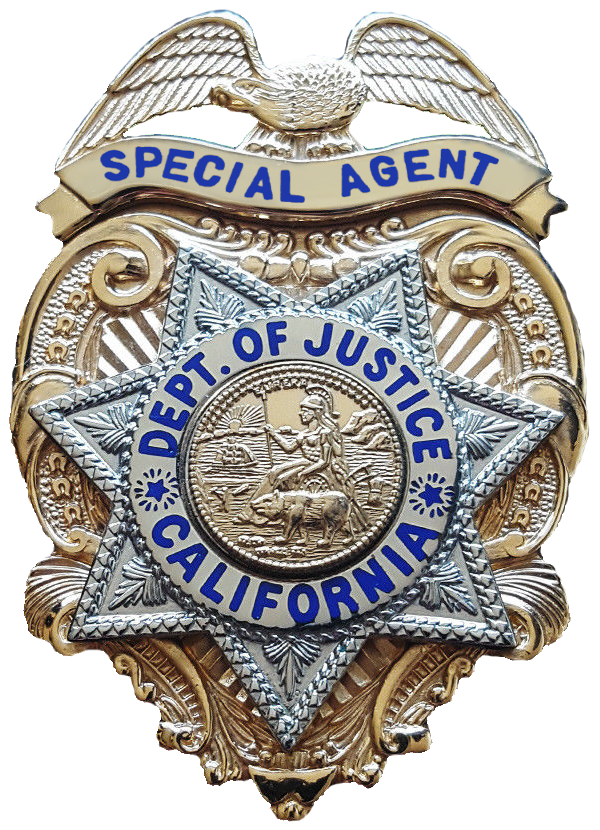
- CA DOJ Special Agent Badge

Agency overview
- Formed: 1 January 1998; 28 years ago
- Preceding agency: Division of Gambling Control (until August 2007)

Jurisdictional structure
- Operations jurisdiction: California, U.S.
- Map of Bureau of Gambling Control's jurisdiction

Operational structure
- Headquarters: 2450 Del Paso Road; Sacramento, CA 95834
- Parent agency: California Department of Justice Division of Law Enforcement

Website
- Bureau of Gambling Control Website

The California Bureau of Gambling Control is a regulatory agency that is part of the California Department of Justice. It regulates legal gambling activities in California to ensure that gambling is conducted honestly, competitively, and free from criminal and corruptive elements. It is one of two agencies in California regulating gambling, along with the California Gambling Control Commission.

The Bureau is also responsible for tracking the identity, prior activities, and present location of all gambling enterprise employees, and for ensuring that all gambling enterprise employees hold a valid work permit. Work permits may be issued by the local authority, or by the California Gambling Control Commission in jurisdictions where a locally issued work permit is not required.

State gaming agencies and the Tribal Government work together to develop and implement a means of regulating Class III gaming on tribal lands to ensure the fair and honest operations of gaming. The Bureau investigates the qualifications of individuals who work as key employees in the tribal casinos, vendors who sell gaming resources to the tribes, as well as financial sources to determine whether they are suitable under the Gambling Control Act (Act) (867, statutes of 1997).

== History and background ==
Before 1998, California's gambling industry was essentially unregulated. In 1984, the Legislature enacted the "Gaming Registration Act," which required the Attorney General's office to provide uniform, minimum regulation of California card rooms. However, the scope of the Attorney General's authority was extremely limited and funding was inadequate. Recognizing the need for broader oversight of California's gambling industry, the Legislature enacted the "Gambling Control Act" (Chapter 867, statutes of 1997).

In March 2000, the voters of California passed Proposition 1A which amended the California Constitution to permit Class III (casino-style) gaming on Indian land, provided that such activities are authorized by a tribal ordinance and conducted in conformity with a gaming compact entered into between the tribe and the state. The tribe and the state share a joint interest in ensuring that tribal gaming activities are free from criminal and other undesirable elements. While the tribe maintains the primary responsibility for on-site regulation of gaming operations, the state is ultimately responsible for ensuring compliance with all aspects of the compact.

The Gambling Control Act (Business and Professions Code section 19800 et seq.) created a comprehensive scheme for statewide regulation of legal gambling under a bifurcated system of administration involving the Bureau of Gambling Control within the Attorney General's Office and the five-member California Gambling Control Commission appointed by the governor. The commission is authorized to establish minimum regulatory standards for the gambling industry, and ensure that state gambling licenses are not issued to or held by unsuitable or unqualified individuals.

The licensing and enforcement staff of the Bureau monitor the conduct of gaming operations to ensure compliance with state gambling laws and conduct in-depth background investigations of the qualifications of applicants for state gambling licenses, work permits, and registrations. Background checks are done for all key employee and state gambling licenses and vendor applicants. Suitability is determined by several factors including the applicant's honesty, integrity, general character, reputation, habits, and financial and criminal history. The Bureau also reviews and approves contracts between third party providers of proposition players and card rooms. Each contract or qualifying amendment must be submitted to the Bureau for prior approval.

The Bureau inspects premises where gambling is conducted; examine gambling equipment, audit papers, books, and records of the gambling establishment; investigate suspected violations of gambling laws; coordinate multi-jurisdictional investigations; investigate complaints lodged against licensees by the public; initiate disciplinary action where appropriate; and provide for the immediate preservation of the public's health, safety, and welfare. Local law enforcement agencies maintain concurrent jurisdiction for investigating suspected violations of gambling laws and may issue work permits.

=== Cardroom regulations litigation ===
In 2026, a California state court held that the Bureau of Gambling Control lacked statutory authority under the Gambling Control Act to impose restrictions on blackjack-style games and player-dealer rotation mechanics.

The lawsuit was brought by the California Gaming Association (CGA) and aligned cardroom organizations following the Office of Administrative Law's approval of the Bureau's proposed regulations in February 2026. San Francisco Superior Court initially issued a preliminary injunction against enforcement before ruling on the merits against the Bureau.

Attorney General Rob Bonta appealed the ruling, and the trial court's order remains subject to ongoing appellate review.

== See also ==
- Gambling in California
