= Humboldt: Life on America's Marijuana Frontier =

2013 nonfiction book by Emily Brady

- Author: Emily Brady
- Subject: War on drugs, cannabis cultivation, Humboldt County, California
- Genre: Nonfiction
- Publisher: Grand Central Publishing
- Publication date: June 18, 2013
- Publication place: United States
- Pages: 304
- ISBN: 978-1-4555-0676-7
- OCLC: 847688423

Humboldt: Life on America's Marijuana Frontier is a 2013 nonfiction book by Emily Brady about the cannabis industry in Humboldt County, California and surrounding Emerald Triangle, as it was in transition from illicit to legal under Proposition 215 and Proposition 64. The author, a New York journalist, moved to Humboldt County in 2010 to write the book, expecting Proposition 19 to pass; full legalization would not occur until the 2016 passage of Proposition 64.

== Reception ==
Publishers Weekly called the book "a moving portrait of a culture and a region at a crossroads". Kirkus Reviews said the book "captures a community torn between the unknown future of cannabis legalization and a present in which prison terms, violent rip-offs and destructive police raids remain commonplace" and although not explicitly arguing for legalization of cannabis, nevertheless "demonstrates that the war on drugs makes 'normal' life impossible in communities like those in the Emerald Triangle". Mother Jones said it was an "empathetic but unflinching portrait" of the community.

== See also ==
- List of books about cannabis
