= Dark Woods (podcast) =

Horror podcast

Dark Woods is a 2021 scripted horror fiction podcast starring Corey Stoll, Monica Raymund, and Reid Scott. It was produced by Wolf Entertainment and released on November 8, 2021 by Endeavor Content

== Adaptation ==
On November 15, 2021, it was announced that Universal Television will adapt it into a television series.
