= California Bureau of Narcotic Enforcement =

State law enforcement agency

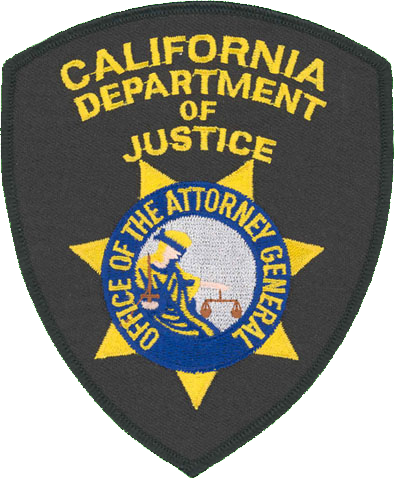
- BNE Shoulder Patch

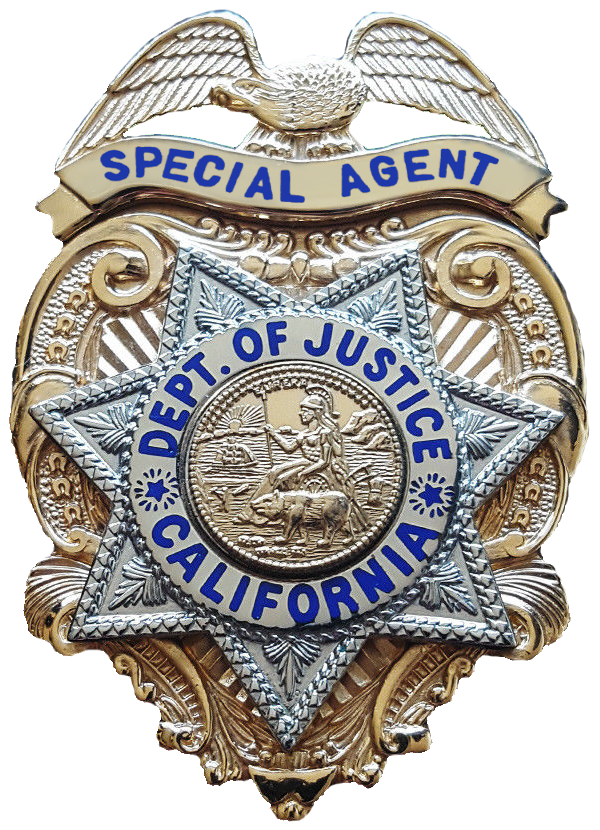
- CA DOJ Special Agent Badge
- Abbreviation: "BNE"
- Motto: Liberty and Justice Under Law

Agency overview
- Formed: 1 January 1927; 99 years ago
- Dissolved: 17 February 2012; 14 years ago
- Superseding agency: California Bureau of Investigation
- Employees: 400 Special Agents at peak, 190 special agents in 2012

Jurisdictional structure
- Operations jurisdiction: California, U.S.

Operational structure
- Headquarters: Sacramento, California
- Parent agency: California Department of Justice (1944-2012); Division of Law Enforcement (1969-2012); Department of Penology (1929-1944); Bureau of Pharmacy (1927-1929)

Facilities
- Commands: 9 Field Offices; 52 Regional Narcotics Task Forces

Notables
- Program: Campaign Against Marijuana Planting

Website
- BNE Website

The California Bureau of Narcotic Enforcement (BNE) was a drug law enforcement agency, under the California Department of Justice (CA DOJ). The BNE was established in 1927, and was the oldest narcotic enforcement bureau in the United States at the time of it disbanding. In 2012, elements of the BNE were merged with its sister bureau forming the new California Bureau of Investigation (CBI or BI). Today, the CBI has taken over some of the former BNE's operations that had not been completely eliminated.

== Role ==
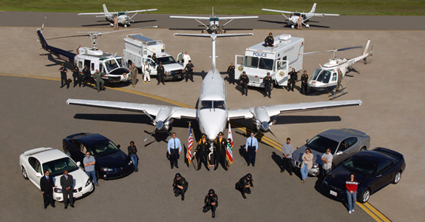
An aerial shot of California Department of Justice Special Agents posing with several CA DOJ vehicles and aircraft

Its programs targeted "major drug dealers, violent career criminals, clandestine drug manufacturers and violators of prescription drug laws". In its statewide agency role, it managed several programs involved in enforcing federal and state drug laws, as well as catching violent criminals who use illegal weapons while committing crimes. It coordinated with local law enforcement agencies. It used Special Operations Units, which identified individuals and groups involved in drug trafficking. They did so by examining financial records and performing undercover operations such as infiltration, surveillance, and tracing narcotic sources to clandestine manufacturers or importers. The BNE focused on targeting the trafficking operations and not minor figures within criminal groups. At the same time, through its diversion program, the Bureau trained doctors, nurses and pharmacists to help them "identify schemes and methods" used in obtaining controlled substances legitimately to then sell them illicitly. The BNE also took part in investigating medical professionals involved in such operations, for example by prescribing or dispensing controlled substances for illegal use. In 1939, BNE Director Paul E. Madden pushed for a California State law amendment which created the Triplicate Prescription Program, which required there be three copies of prescriptions: one copy for the pharmacy, one copy for BNE and the third that had to be preserved for two years.

Its headquarters were located in Sacramento among other CA DOJ investigative bureaus, with nine regional offices in Fresno, Los Angeles, Orange, Redding, Riverside, Sacramento, San Diego, San Francisco, and San Jose. Task forces and operations within the Bureau of Narcotic Enforcement included the Campaign Against Marijuana Planting (CAMP), the Clandestine Laboratory Enforcement Program (Clan Lab or CLEP), Violence Suppression Units (VSU), the CrackDown Program, the California Triplicate Prescription Program (TPP), the Diversion Program, the Financial Investigations Program (FIP), Special Operation Units (SOU), and over 50 regional narcotics task forces throughout California. 48 regional narcotic task forces previously run by BNE now fall under the CBI. In 2009, the BNE had 187 agents.

=== Special Agent Rank Classifications ===
- Special Agent
- Special Agent Supervisor / Task Force Commander
- Special Agent in-Charge
- Senior Special Agent in-Charge
- Assistant Chief
- Deputy Chief
- Chief

== List of Chiefs of BNE ==
| Name | Took office | Left office |
|---|---|---|
| Frank H. Benson | 1927 | 1930 |
| H.S. Seager | 1930 | 1931 |
| Edward Powers | 1931 | 1931 |
| Joseph P. Anderson | 1932 | 1932 |
| George K. Home | 1932 | 1933 |
| William G. Walker | 1933 | 1939 |
| Paul E. Madden | 1939 | 1943 |
| F.J. O'Ferrall | 1943 | 1947 |
| Walter R. Creighton | 1947 | 1958 |
| John E. Storer | 1958 | 1972 |
| Leslie Menconi | 1972 | 1974 |
| Robert W. Jensen | 1975 | 1975 |
| Eugene B. Hollingsworth | 1975 | 1977 |
| | 1976 | 1978 |
| Steve C. Helsley | 1979 | 1985 |
| Charles E. Casey | 1986 | 1986 |
| Joe Doane | 1986 | 2000 |
| Christy McCampbell | 2000 | 2003 |
| John Gaines | 2004 | 2011 |
| Kent Shaw | 2011 | 2012 |

== In popular culture ==
- The 1958 film The True Story of Lynn Stuart, loosely based on a true story, includes an introduction by then California Attorney General Edmund G. Brown, commended the work of BNE.
- Bruce Springsteen's 1995 song Sinaloa Cowboys, was written based on a Los Angeles Times article that included many quotes of BNE agents, that were used as lines in the song.
- In light of the opioid epidemic and the release of previously sealed documents from Purdue Pharma, the episode 'In Triplicate' of the podcast Revisionist History, hosted by Malcolm Gladwell, covered the history of the Triplicate Prescription Program, created in 1939 by BNE Chief Paul Madden and its influence. Two months early, in May 2022, The Quarterly Journal of Economics published an article, Origins of the Opioid Crisis and its Enduring Impacts, which studied the difference in the opioid crisis in states that adopted a BNE style triplicate program and those that did not.
- BNE plays a role in multiple novels by William P. Wood, including Court of Honor, Quicksand, and Broken Trust, which was adapted into a 1995 made-for-tv movie starring Tom Selleck.
