= California Gambling Control Commission =

Gaming Commission overview
- Jurisdiction: State of California
- Headquarters: 2399 Gateway Oaks Drive, Suite 220; Sacramento, CA 95833
- Website: California Commission website

Map

California Gambling Control Commission (CGCC) is the official gambling commission of the state of California.

The Commission was proposed in the mid 1990s under the bills AB 2803 and AB 362 to "create a state agency to license card clubs and casinos operating within the state", based on Nevada's state gaming commission.

As of May 2020, the California Gambling Control Commission has jurisdiction over 86 licensed non-tribal gambling establishments (cardrooms) in California.

The Commission's primary responsibilities related to Tribal gaming include:

- Making suitability determinations for Tribal key employees, gaming resource suppliers (vendors), and financial sources;
- Serving as the administrator or trustee of specified funds, including distributing funds to eligible non-gaming Tribes; and
- Ensuring that the allocation of gaming devices or slot machines among the gaming tribes does not exceed the allowable number of gaming devices.

== See also ==
- Gambling in California
