= California Bureau of Firearms =

State law enforcement agency

California DOJ Bureau of Firearms

Agency overview
- Formed: 1 September 1999; 27 years ago
- Preceding agency: Firearms Division (until April 2007)
- Employees: Director Allison Mendoza (3/2/23 to Present)

Jurisdictional structure
- Operations jurisdiction: California, U.S.

Operational structure
- Headquarters: Sacramento, California
- Parent agency: California Department of Justice Division of Law Enforcement

Website
- Bureau of Firearms Website

The Bureau of Firearms is a bureau of the Division of Law Enforcement of the California Department of Justice responsible for education, regulation, and enforcement relating to manufacture, sales, ownership, safety training, and transfer of firearms. The Bureau of Firearms was established in September 1999, originally the Firearms Division, reorganized into the Bureau of Firearms in April 2007.

Bureau of Firearms Chiefs / Directors
Last Name	First name	Title	From	To	Entity
Mendoza	Allison	Director	03/02/23	Present	Bureau of Firearms
Mendoza	Allison	Acting Director	11/1/22	03/01/23	Bureau of Firearms
Graham	Blake	Acting Director	07/18/22	10/31/22	Bureau of Firearms
Lopez	Luis E.	Director	02/17/20	08/31/22	Bureau of Firearms
Orick	Brent	Acting Director	07/09/19	02/16/20	Bureau of Firearms
Horan	Martin J. IV	Acting Director	10/01/18	07/08/19	Bureau of Firearms
Caligiuri	Christopher	Acting Director	06/01/18	07/31/18	Bureau of Firearms
UNKNOWN	UNKNOWN	Chief	05/04/18	05/31/18	Bureau of Firearms
Lindley	Stephen	Chief / Director	07/11	05/03/18	Bureau of Firearms
Lindley	Stephen	Acting Chief	12/09	07/11	Bureau of Firearms
Cid	Wilfredo	Chief	04/07	12/09	Bureau of Firearms
Rossi	Randy	Director	09/99	04/07	Division of Firearms

Bureau of Firearms Programs and Sections
Program	Section	Units	Description
Law Enforcement	Firearms Investigations and Dangerous Weapons Enforcement	Investigations and Enforcement	ADD
Law Enforcement	Firearms Investigations and Dangerous Weapons Enforcement	Armed and Prohibited Person Teams	ADD
Regulatory	Firearm Permit Section	Firearms Permit Unit	ADD
Regulatory	Firearm Permit Section	Carry Concealed Weapons Permits Unit	ADD
Regulatory	Firearm Record Section	Serial Number Unit	ADD
Regulatory	Firearm Record Section	Automated Firearms Unit	ADD
Regulatory	Firearm Record Section	Mental Health Unit	ADD
Regulatory	Licensing and Certification of Eligibility Section	Centralized List Unit	ADD
Regulatory	Licensing and Certification of Eligibility Section	Certificate of Eligibility	ADD
Regulatory	Licensing and Certification of Eligibility Section	Ammunition Vendor License	ADD
Regulatory	Armed and Prohibited Persons Section	Example	Utilizes the Armed Prohibited Persons System (APPS), a database populated with data from a number of existing DOJ databases, to identify criminals who are prohibited from possessing firearms subsequent to the legal acquisition of firearms or registration of assault weapons. The APPS program is a highly sophisticated investigative tool that provides law enforcement agencies with information about gun owners who are legally prohibited from possessing firearms.
Regulatory	Firearm Applicant and Release Section	Phone Resolution Unit	ADD
Regulatory	Firearm Applicant and Release Section	Law Enforcement Gun Release Unit	ADD
Regulatory	Firearm Applicant and Release Section	Employment Subsequent Notification Unit	ADD
Regulatory	Background Clearance Unit	Example	ADD
Regulatory	Training, Information and Compliance Section	N/A	Provides firearms-related instruction and expertise to dealers, law enforcement, superior and juvenile courts, mental health facilities, district attorneys, legislators and the general public and inspects firearms dealerships and manufacturers to ensure compliance with firearms laws and regulations. This section also certifies handgun and firearm safety device testing laboratories and maintains a roster of handguns and firearm safety devices certified for sale in California.
Regulatory	Customer Support Center	N/A	ADD
Regulatory	Assault Weapon Registration	Team 1 and Team 2	ADD
Special Assignment Section	Reporting and Quality Assurance Section	Dealer Record of Sale Quality Assurance Team	ADD
Special Assignment Section	Reporting and Quality Assurance Section	California Reporting Information System Dealer Record of Sale Processing Unit	ADD
Special Assignment Section	Technology Support	California Reporting Information System Dealer Record of Sale Processing Unit	ADD
Administration and Special Projects Section	N/A	N/A	Provides administrative and special project support to the entire BOF. Section responsibilities include administering the BOF annual budget, analyzing all firearms-related legislation, providing personnel services, maintaining the BOF website and all BOF information technology issues, and providing procurement and contract services.

== See also ==
- California Highway Patrol
- Bureau of Alcohol, Tobacco, Firearms and Explosives
