= California Bureau of Investigation =

Statewide detective agency of California

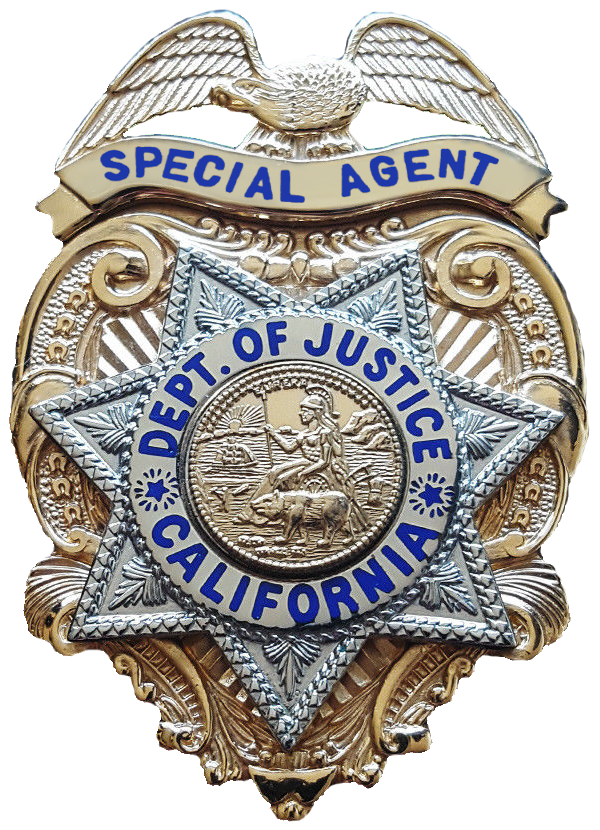

- Flag of California
- Abbreviation: CBI

Jurisdictional structure
- Operations jurisdiction: California

Operational structure
- Overseen by: California Department of Justice
- Agency executive: Brian Rose, Director

The California Bureau of Investigation (CBI or BI) is California's statewide criminal investigative bureau under the California Department of Justice (CA DOJ), in the Division of Law Enforcement (DLE), administered by the Office of the State Attorney General that provides expert investigative services to assist local, state, tribal, and federal agencies in major criminal investigations ranging across the state.

== History ==
The California Office of the Attorney General (AG) was created in 1850; however, permanent law enforcement and criminal investigative elements of the CA DOJ were not established until the early 20th century. Despite this, CA DOJ's Law Enforcement personnel can trace part of their roots back to that of the original California Rangers; the first statewide criminal investigative and law enforcement agency created on May 17, 1853. Although the California Rangers were quickly disbanded (following their success in bringing the violent Five Joaquins gang to justice), their special law enforcement capabilities and statewide investigative mission now reside primarily with CA DOJ Special Agents, such as those assigned to CBI.

The CBI is the oldest continuously operating statewide criminal investigative agency in the CA DOJ and the state of California. Listed below are some key dates in the history of the CBI clarifying this lineage:

- In 1905, the California Bureau of Criminal Identification (CBCI) was created for the classification and identification of incarcerated criminals via various means such as fingerprints. However, the original CBCI was disbanded in 1909 and had no formal criminal investigative mission.
- On January 1, 1918 (following approved legislation in 1917), CBCI was reinstated as the California Bureau of Criminal Identification and Investigation (CBCII), following recognition by state officials that unification of state law enforcement efforts was needed in collecting/maintaining a repository of criminal identification information accessible to law enforcement agencies throughout the state, in addition to investigating and apprehending criminals. This is also recognized as the founding date of the CBI, as it was when the bureau adopted its first criminal investigative authorities, assisting other law enforcement agencies throughout the state as needed in complex criminal investigations. The investigators within this bureau were recruited as experts in a variety of criminal investigative and scientific fields. CBCII, along with the later (but now-defunct) California Bureau of Narcotic Enforcement (BNE) created in 1927, provided the state with its initial state-wide criminal investigative capabilities it still has today via CBI.
- On May 1, 1944, the CA DOJ was created, and the California Office of the Attorney General (OAG) was transferred to it (which also administers it), along with the BNE.
- In 1945, the CBCII was also transferred under the CA DOJ, and shortly after, was split into the Bureau of Investigation (BI) and Bureau of Criminal Statistics (later to be renamed to the Bureau of Criminal Identification and Information). This is where BI would remain until the present day (as the modern CBI).
- In 1962, the Division of Law Enforcement (DLE) was created under the CA DOJ. The BNE and CBI were transferred under the new DLE, with a single division director (later renamed to division chief) overseeing the bureaus, and reporting directly to the CA AG.
- In 1971, the 26th CA AG (a former FBI agent and U.S. Army intelligence officer), drastically reorganized the DLE to improve efficiency and effectiveness.
- In 1998, despite many throughout the state already referring to it as such, the BI officially re-brands itself as "CBI" (which it is still widely referred to as today) with the approval of the 30th Attorney General of California, Bill Lockyer, and becomes an extremely well-known and respected, state investigative law enforcement agency. At this point, CBI includes field operations, an organized crime unit, a witness protection program, a major crimes program, a gang/criminal extremist unit, and an intelligence unit. The DOJ/CBI Special Agents of this time are assigned to multiple task forces (state and federal), and assist other departments throughout the state with investigations, operations, support, and advanced law enforcement training, while also still conducting investigations related to any of the California Attorney General's work/cases/matters of interest.
- By 2008, the acclaim and prestige of the CBI had grown, with the CBS television network creating a popular new television series based on a team of CBI investigators, The Mentalist. The show lasted seven seasons.
- In 2009, although still the same organization in substance, the official name of CBI was changed to the Bureau of Investigation and Intelligence (BII) after it merged with the Bureau of Intelligence following a substantial reorganization and consolidation of the CA DOJ's Division of Law Enforcement.
- In 2012, DLE restructuring culminated with it being significantly cut, and numerous CA DOJ Special Agents (assigned to multiple bureaus) were laid off. The law enforcement capabilities of the DLE were also drastically reduced or eliminated. As part of this reduction, the BNE was disbanded, with a few of its remaining functions/personnel being transferred to the BII. After this, the BII was renamed back to "BI" on February 17, 2012. Since this, the DLE and CBI have slowly attempted to rebuild capabilities it once had, but is still not near the level it was before 2012.

== Current functions ==
Today the CBI can be assigned at the discretion of the State Attorney General, perform investigations on public land for incidents that occur outside of local jurisdictions, or can be requested by local authority for various reasons (e.g., areas that are too small to have local detectives or cross-jurisdiction coordination of major crimes). The CBI also operates several programs including a Special Investigations Team (SIT) handling high-profile investigations and special investigative requests from the Attorney General's Office, a Special Operations Unit (SOU) targeting murder suspects and violent criminal groups with special equipment/resources, a Human Trafficking Team, a Sexual Predator and Assault Team (SPAT), a Tax Recovery in the Underground Economy (TRUE) Task Force, a Recycling Fraud Team (RFT), an intelligence operations clearing house/de-confliction center for law enforcement agencies (LA CLEAR), and the state anti-terrorism program. The CBI also runs and/or participates in several other highly successful state and federal task forces.

== In fiction ==
A fictional version of CBI was featured in the television series The Mentalist. It featured several units, with the one featuring the main characters focusing mostly on the investigation of homicides, and occasionally kidnappings or missing persons. The Region 1 DVD release of the fourth season of The Mentalist includes the special CBI: Behind the Badge, featuring interaction with actual law enforcement officers in California, specifically focusing on a homicide task force with several agents and officers of different agencies (including those from CBI), who tutored those who worked on the program in providing a realistic portrayal.

A CBI Special Agent was also featured in a third-season episode of the crime television series Numb3rs, where the CBI agent worked together with the FBI to catch a murderous cult leader.

Fictional CBI Special Agent Kathryn Dance appears in Jeffery Deaver's novels, starting with The Sleeping Doll (2007) and ending with Solitude Creek (2015).
