= Kentucky Department of Criminal Investigation =

Law enforcement agency in Kentucky

Kentucky Department of Criminal Investigations

Agency overview
- Formed: September 1, 2004

Jurisdictional structure
- Operations jurisdiction: The State of Kentucky
- Area: 40,408 sq mi (104,660 km^{2})
- Population: 4,509,342(2020)

Operational structure
- Headquarters: Frankfort, Kentucky

Website
- www.ag.ky.gov/about/Office-Divisions/DCI/Pages/default.aspx

The Kentucky Department of Criminal Investigation is an agency in the Commonwealth of Kentucky that operates as the law enforcement and investigative arm of the Office of the Attorney General.It is the State Bureau of Investigation for the state of Kentucky. The department was founded in September 2004 by former Kentucky Attorney General Greg Stumbo as the Kentucky Bureau of Investigation (KBI). The KBI was reorganized into the Department of Criminal Investigation by Stumbo's successor Jack Conway.

== Branches ==
DCI is a specialized agency with three different investigative branches.

== See also ==
- List of law enforcement agencies in Kentucky
