= Spy Rock Road =

Studio album by The Lookouts
- Released: May 1989
- Recorded: 1988–1989 at Sergay's Recording Emporium in Berkeley, California; Sound and Vision in San Francisco; Dancing Dog Studios in Emeryville, California
- Genre: Punk rock
- Length: 32:49
- Label: Lookout! (LK 018)
- Producer: Kevin Army and The Lookouts

The Lookouts chronology
One Planet One People (1987)	Spy Rock Road (1989)	Mendocino Homeland (1989)

Professional ratings
Review scores
Source	Rating
Allmusic	4/5 stars

Spy Rock Road is the second and final studio album by the American punk rock band The Lookouts. It was released in 1989 through Lookout! Records

== Track listing ==
1. "That Girl's from Outer Space" - 2:29
2. "Wild" - 3:37
3. "Alienation" - 4:35
4. "Generation" - 2:25
5. "The Green Hills of England" - 3:34
6. "Living Behind Bars" - 1:58
7. "Red Sea" - 3:06
8. "Sonny Boy" - 1:17
9. "Trees" - 5:11
10. "Life" - 3:32
11. "Friends" - 1:31

== Personnel ==
- Larry Livermore - lead vocals, guitar
- Kain Kong - bass, backing vocals
- Tré Cool - drums, lead vocals on track 1 and 8

Additional performers

- Lint - lead guitar on tracks 6 and 8
- Kevin Army - acoustic guitar on tracks 5 and 7

Production

- Kevin Army - producer, engineer, mixing
- The Lookouts - producers
- M. - cover art
- D. - layout
- John Golden - mastering
