= Tré Cool =

German-American drummer (born 1972)

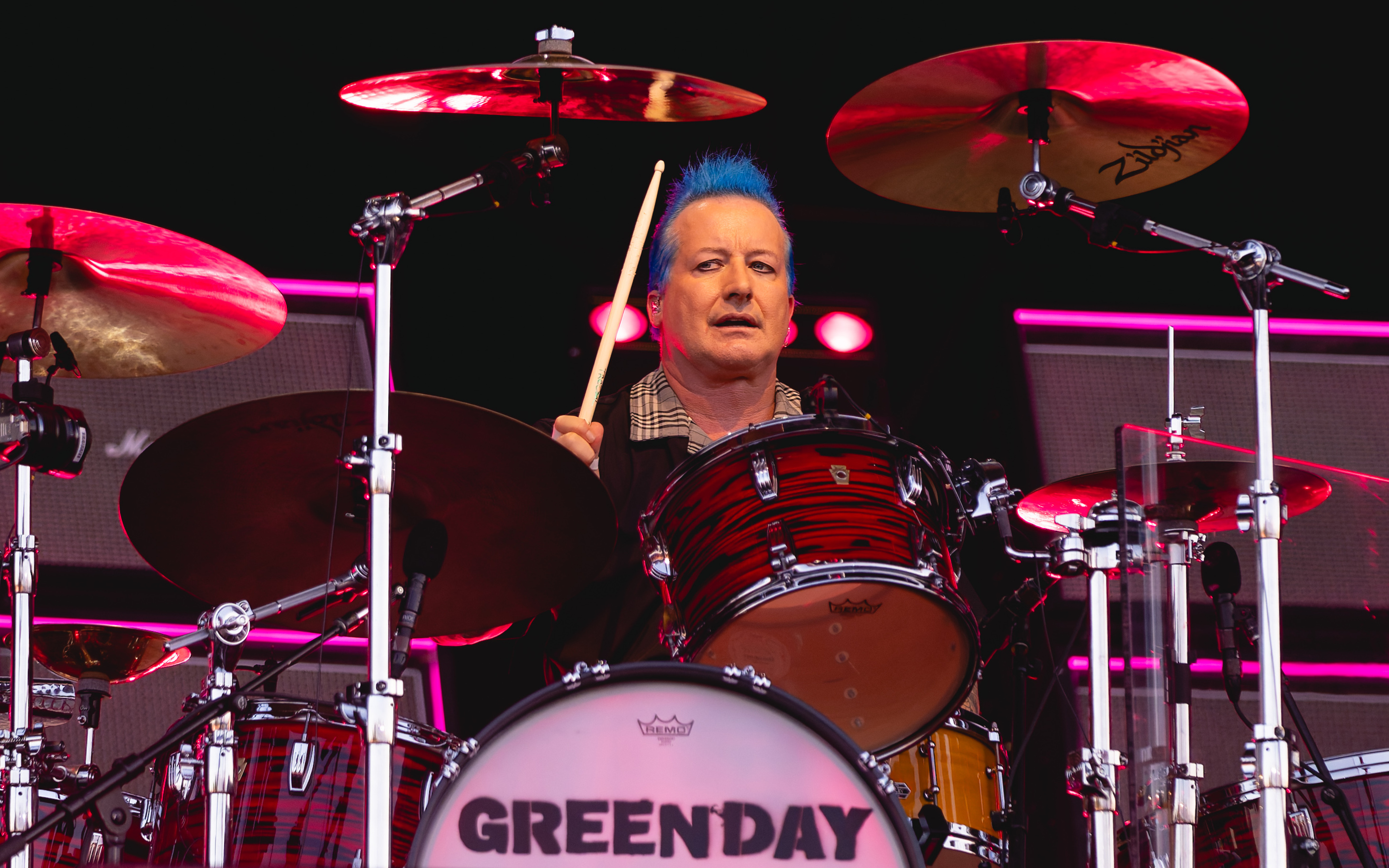
- Tré Cool at the Isle of Wight Festival 2024

Background information
- Also known as: The Snoo; Raj Goombar
- Born: Frank Edwin Wright III; December 9, 1972 (age 53); Frankfurt, Hesse, West Germany
- Origin: Willits, California, U.S.
- Genres: Punk rock; pop-punk; alternative rock; hardcore punk; garage rock; new wave; death metal
- Occupations: Musician; songwriter
- Instrument: Drums
- Years active: 1985–present
- Member of: Green Day; The Network; Foxboro Hot Tubs; Dead Mermaids; Bubu and the Brood
- Formerly of: The Lookouts; Samiam
- Spouses: Lisea Lyons (m. 1995; div. 1996); Claudia Suarez (m. 2000; div. 2003); Sara Rose Lipert (m. 2014)

Frank Edwin Wright III (born December 9, 1972), better known by his stage name Tré Cool, is an American musician and songwriter, best known as the long-time drummer for the rock band Green Day. He replaced the band's former drummer John Kiffmeyer in 1990. Cool has also played in the Lookouts, Samiam, Dead Mermaids, Bubu and the Brood and the Green Day side projects the Network and the Foxboro Hot Tubs.

== Early life ==
Frank Edwin Wright III was born on December 9, 1972, in Frankfurt, West Germany, to Frank Edwin Wright Jr. and Linda Wright. He lived in Willits, California, with his father and elder sister Lori. He has German heritage, and his father was a helicopter pilot during the Vietnam War.

In his second year, Cool dropped out of high school and opted to earn a GED. He began taking classes at a local community college but would again drop out as Green Day became a more time-consuming priority. During this time, the band considered breaking up because it took a long time to adjust to playing with Cool.

== Career ==
Wright's closest neighbor in his childhood was Larry Livermore, who at the time was the singer of the punk band the Lookouts. When Wright was 11, Livermore recruited him as the drummer of the Lookouts, and Tre took on the name of "Tré Cool", using both the French word "très" (meaning "very") and the English word "cool" as a way of saying he was "very cool". "Trey", a play on Wright's family's generational titles, since he was the third Frank Wright, had already been Wright's nickname prior to the addition of "Cool."

Cool sang "The Mushroom is Exploding" from the Lookouts' 1987 debut album, One Planet One People. A twelve-year-old Cool can be heard singing the demos of which in 1985's "Lookout! It's The Lookouts!" He then appeared on their second album, Spy Rock Road, with "That Girl's from Outer Space" and "Sonny Boy".

When Green Day's drummer, John Kiffmeyer, left the band, the group recruited Cool to be their drummer. Cool's father was supportive and overhauled a bookmobile to transport the band. He would later say: "I watched them go from a bunch of kids to a group of musicians with work ethic," also adding: "On their first tour or two, it was more of a party than anything else. I still scratch my head and say, 'How in the hell did they make it?' They used to practice in my living room here – a lot of the songs they did on Dookie. You hear it coming together, and you don't expect people are going to go out and buy it. But when it does, you just say, 'Wow that's so cool.'"

With Green Day, he sang and played the guitar on "Dominated Love Slave" from Kerplunk and the hidden track "All by Myself" from Dookie, both of which he wrote and composed (on "Dominated Love Slave", guitarist and vocalist Billie Joe Armstrong played drums). He wrote and sang the subtrack "Rock and Roll Girlfriend" from the medley "Homecoming" featured on the album American Idiot. He also sang and wrote the track "DUI" ("Driving Under the Influence"), which was recorded for Green Day's fifth studio album, Nimrod, and was due to be released on the compilation album Shenanigans in 2002, but was omitted and can only be found on promotional unmastered copies of the album and online. Several live tracks also exist, usually from around 1993, such as "Food Around the Corner", a song from the 1943 Elmer Fudd cartoon An Itch in Time. Another live track, "Billie Joe's Mom", was also recorded.

In 1998, after Green Day won a "Moon Man" Trophy at the MTV Music Awards, Cool famously climbed on the Universal Globe at Universal Studios.

During a radio interview at Washington D.C.'s alternative station DC 101 (Elliott in the Morning), Cool sang and played acoustic guitar on a short song entitled "Like a Rat Does Cheese", a song about the pleasure of fellatio. He has also recorded a version of Tay Zonday's "Chocolate Rain". He also sang on the Network songs "Hungry Hungry Models", "Asphyxia" "Flat Earth", "Respirator", "Squatter", "That's How They Get You", "The Stranger", and "Hey Elon" as the Snoo.

Cool was featured in the Nitpick Six: The Six Best Drum Fills and ranked in at number 6 for the intro to "Basket Case". In 2014, LA Weekly named Tré Cool No. 2 of the "Top 5 Punk Drummers of All Time".

On April 18, 2015, Cool was inducted into the Rock and Roll Hall of Fame as a member of Green Day in their first year of eligibility.

In 2024, Cool performed on Green Day's fourteenth studio album, Saviors. He then toured with the band on the Saviors Tour, between 2024 and 2025.

On May 1, 2025, Cool received a star on the Hollywood Walk of Fame with Green Day.

== Artistry ==
=== Musical style ===
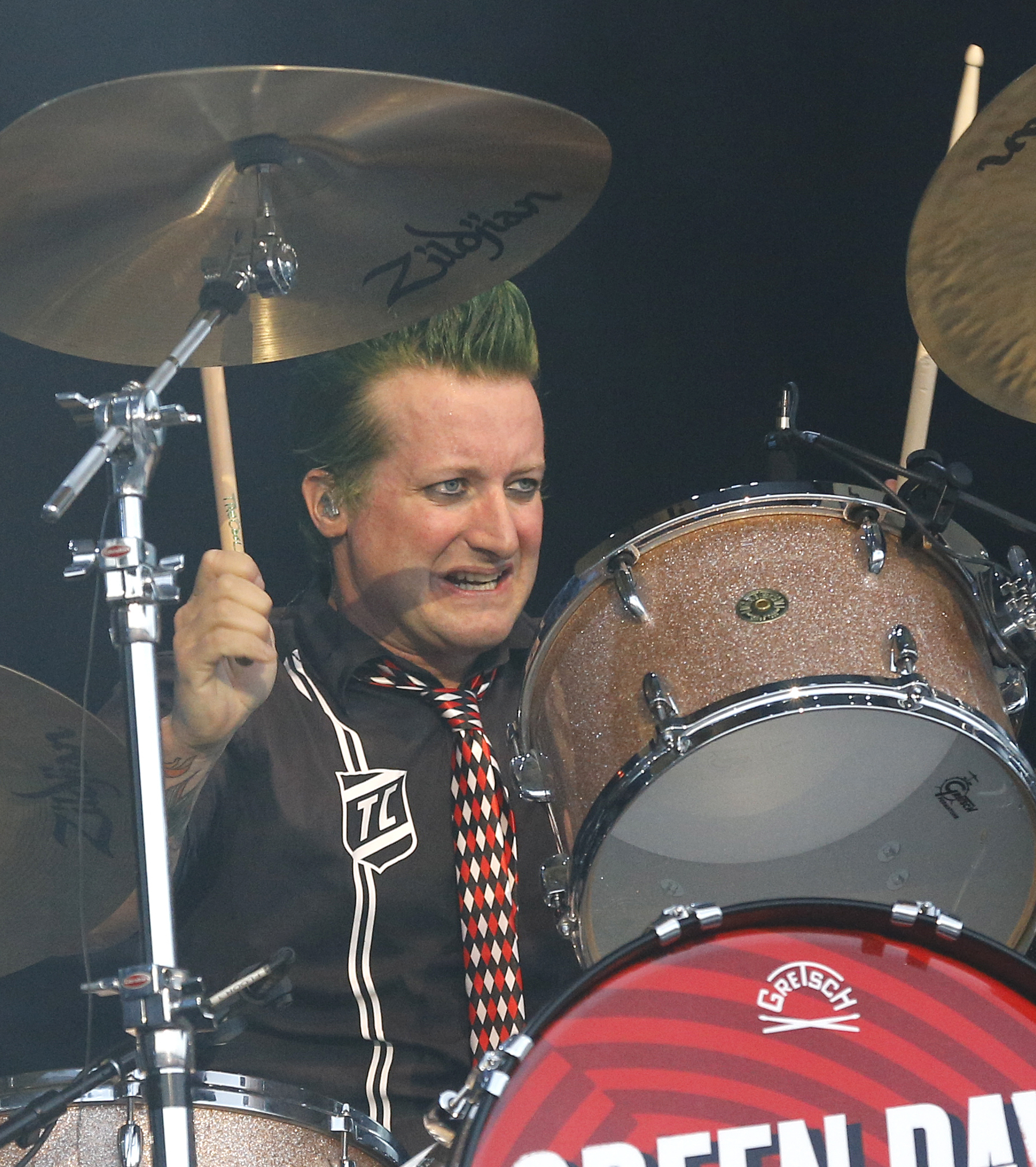
Tré Cool with Green Day at Rock im Park 2013

Before joining Green Day, Tré Cool employed a more intricate drumming style. He explained that "When I started, I had too many drums. I was a little reggae-happy and into fancier beats than was needed. It took me a while to get it: play the song, don't play the instrument. I started figuring out how to make the band a stronger unit, to make it jump." After playing with Green Day bassist Mike Dirnt, Tré Cool adopted a more rhythmic style with fewer drum fills to match Dirnt's bass lines.

Greg Kot of the Chicago Tribune referred to Tré Cool as "Green Day's most potent weapon", adding that "His monstrous kick-drum wallop evokes John Bonham, while his manic fills make him punk's answer to Keith Moon." His stage persona has also been compared to Moon. Sound engineer Neill King, who worked with Green Day on Dookie, noted that Tré Cool shares Moon's "wild animal approach" to playing drums, and explained that the band encountered difficulties while recording "Basket Case" due to his unpredictable style: "It's not that Tré wasn't a good drummer, but in terms of his performances we wanted the best of the best...So, although we wanted him to do all of his wild fills and crazy drumming, we couldn't just let him go. He'd drift in and out of time, which is terrific live, but which was unacceptable on radio at that time."

=== Influences ===
During his speech at Green Day's Rock and Roll Hall of Fame induction in 2015, Cool credited Ringo Starr from the Beatles, Keith Moon from the Who, John Bonham from Led Zeppelin, Mitch Mitchell from the Jimi Hendrix Experience, Charlie Watts from the Rolling Stones, jazz and big band drummer Buddy Rich, John Wright from NoMeansNo, Alex Van Halen from Van Halen, Dave Mello from Operation Ivy, Al Schvitz from MDC, Meg White from the White Stripes, and Aaron Cometbus from Crimpshrine and Pinhead Gunpowder as his favorite drummers. Green Day performed the Beatles' version of the Shirelles' "Boys" with Starr at the Rock and Roll Hall of Fame ceremony that same year, in which Cool drummed alongside his idol.

== Personal life ==
Tré has three children: Ramona Isabel Wright, born on January 12, 1995, with Lisea Lyons; Frank "Frankito" Edwin Wright IV, born on February 11, 2001, with Claudia Suarez; and Mickey Otis Wright, born on December 27, 2018, with Sara Rose Lipert.

During early 2020, Cool sat in with Willie Nelson and his band after the death of Nelson's friend and drummer Paul English.

== Discography ==
=== Green Day ===
- Kerplunk! (1991) – drums, lead vocals and guitar on "Dominated Love Slave"
- Dookie (1994) – drums, lead vocals and guitar on "All by Myself"
- Insomniac (1995) – drums
- Nimrod (1997) – drums, percussion
- Warning (2000) – drums, percussion, accordion
- American Idiot (2004) – drums, percussion, lead vocals on the fourth part of "Homecoming", "Rock and Roll Girlfriend"
- 21st Century Breakdown (2009) – drums, percussion
- ¡Uno! (2012) – drums, backing vocals
- ¡Dos! (2012) – drums, percussion
- ¡Tré! (2012) – drums, percussion
- Revolution Radio (2016) – drums, percussion
- Father of All Motherfuckers (2020) – drums, percussion
- Saviors (2024) – drums, percussion

=== DVD ===
- Bullet in a Bible (film; 2005) – himself
- Awesome as Fuck (film; 2011) – himself

=== The Lookouts ===
- Lookout! It's the Lookouts (demo album, 1985) – drums, vocals, lead vocals
- One Planet One People (1987) – drums, vocals, lead vocals on "The Mushroom Is Exploding"
- The Thing That Ate Floyd (Compilation Album, 1989) – lead vocals on "Outside"
- Spy Rock Road (1989) – drums, lead vocals on "That Girl's from Outer Space" and "Sonny Boy"

=== Foxboro Hot Tubs ===
- Stop Drop and Roll!!! (2008) – drums

=== The Network ===
- Money Money 2020 (2003) – drums, lead vocals on "Hungry Hungry Models" (as 'the Snoo')
- Money Money 2020 Part II: We Told Ya So! (2020) – drums, lead vocals on "Asphyxia", "Flat Earth", "Respirator", "Squatter", "That's How They Get You", "The Stranger", and "Hey Elon" (as the Snoo)

=== Other media appearances ===
- King of the Hill (TV series; 1997) – Cane Skretteburg
- Jackass Backyard BBQ (TV special; 2002) – himself
- Riding in Vans with Boys (film; 2003) – himself
- Live Freaky! Die Freaky! (film; 2006) – The Maid
- The Simpsons Movie (film; 2007) – himself
- Heart Like a Hand Grenade (film; 2008) – himself
- Green Day: Rock Band (video game; 2010) – himself (voice, likeness, and archive footage)
- ¡Cuatro! (film; 2013) as himself
- Broadway Idiot (film; 2013) – himself
- Fred Armisen: Standup for Drummers (Netflix Special; 2018) – himself
- Let There Be Drums! (film; 2022) – himself
- Nimrods (film – 2026) as himself
