= The Lookouts =

American punk rock band

- Origin: Iron Peak, California, U.S.
- Genres: Punk rock, hardcore punk
- Years active: 1985–1990
- Labels: Lookout, Don Giovanni
- Past members: Larry Livermore; Kain Kong; Tré Cool

The Lookouts were an American punk rock band that existed from 1985 to 1990 on Iron Peak, a remote rural mountain community outside Laytonville, California. The members were Larry Livermore on guitar and vocals, Kain Kong (Kain Hanschke) on bass and vocals, and Tré Cool on drums and vocals. All three contributed on songwriting. The band is most famous for being Tré Cool's first band before joining Green Day.

== History ==
Looking to start a punk band, Livermore had trouble finding members, citing the majority of the local musicians being hippies and "completely uninterested in the music we wanted to make". Eventually, Livermore recruited 14-year-old Kain Hanschke on bass and 12-year-old Frank Edwin "Tré" Wright III on drums. Although he had never before played drums, young Tré showed an instant affinity for them, likely because, as Livermore said, "he loved making a lot of noise and getting everyone to look at him."

Claiming that the members needed "punk rock names", Livermore gave his fellow musicians new last names. Kain's surname went from Hanschke to "Kong", while Tré went from Wright to "Cool". It has often been claimed that Livermore was the person to dub Cool with "Tré". His family had long before given him the nickname, a play on the word "tres", or "three", because he was the third Frank Edwin in his family.

The Lookouts recorded three albums, Lookout! It's the Lookouts, One Planet One People, and Spy Rock Road, and two EPs, Mendocino Homeland and IV.

On July 10, 1990, we went into The Art Of Ears studio in San Francisco and recorded nine songs, six of which would ultimately be released [as IV], and then went over to Oakland to play what would be, though we didn't know it at the time, our last show. I was never that great at lead guitar (or rhythm guitar, for that matter, if we're going to be honest), so I asked a friend named Billie Joe to play on the recordings.

From there, Livermore went on to running his record label, named Lookout Records; One Planet One People was the first release in the label's history. Livermore eventually sold Lookout Records to business partner Chris Appelgren in the mid-1990s. Kong became a National Park Service park ranger. Cool became the drummer for Green Day, after they were left in a lurch by their first drummer.

In 2015, Don Giovanni Records released Spy Rock Road and Other Stories, a compilation featuring all of the tracks from Spy Rock Road, Mendocino Homeland and IV, a few compilation tracks and one from their demo, Lookout! It's the Lookouts. Besides a couple of compilation appearances, this marked the first time the band's recordings were released on CD.

== Members ==
- Larry Livermore – guitar, vocals (1985–1990)
- Kain Kong – bass, vocals (1985–1990)
- Tré Cool – drums, vocals (1985–1990)

== Discography ==
=== Studio albums ===
- One Planet One People (1987)
- Spy Rock Road (1989)

=== Extended plays ===
- Mendocino Homeland (1989)
- IV (1990)

=== Compilation albums ===
- Spy Rock Road and Other Stories... (2015)

=== Compilation appearances ===
- "Why Don't You Die?" and "California" on Bay Mud – David Hayes self-released cassette (1986)
- "Recycled Love" on Lethal Noise, Vol. 2 – David Hayes self-released cassette (1987)
- "Insane", "Recycled Love", "The Mushroom Is Exploding" and "Friends of Mine" on Limited Potential – Limited Potential Records (1987)
- "Outside" on The Thing That Ate Floyd – Lookout Records (1989)
- "Big Green Monsters" on Make the Collector Nerd Sweat – Very Small Records (1990)
- "Once Upon a Time" on More Songs About Plants and Trees – Allied Records (1990)
- "Kick Me in the Head" on Can of Pork – Lookout Records (1992)

=== Demo albums ===
- Lookout! It's the Lookouts (1985)
