= California Department of Justice =

Statewide investigative law enforcement agency

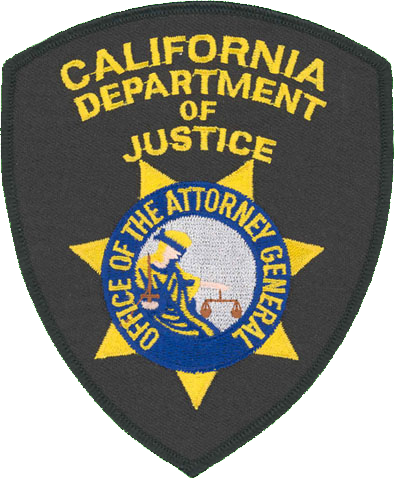
- Patch of the California Department of Justice

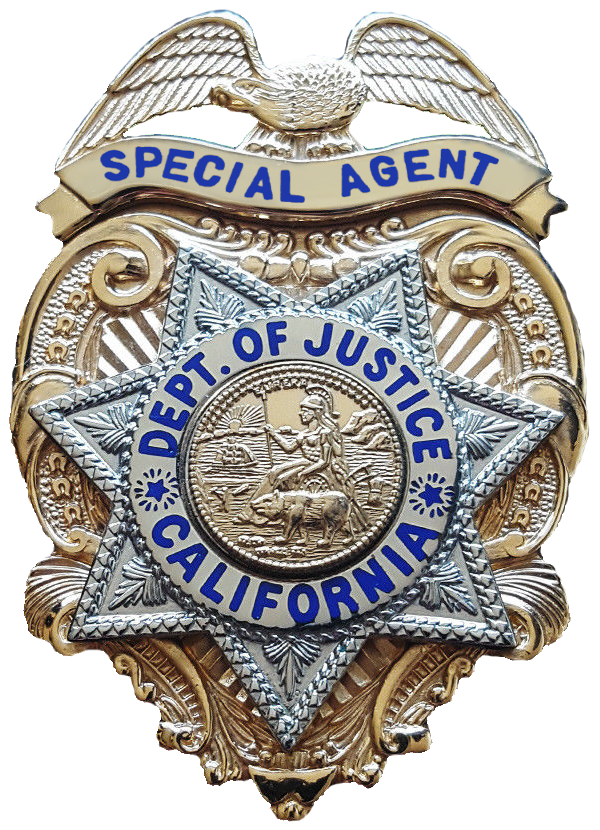
- Badge of the California Department of Justice

Agency overview
- Formed: 1943
- Preceding agency: Department of Penology
- Type: Executive Department
- Jurisdiction: California government
- Headquarters: 4949 Broadway, Sacramento, California, United States
- Employees: 4,500
- Annual budget: $1.3 billion (FY 2025)
- Agency executives: Rob Bonta, Attorney General; Venus D. Johnson, Chief Deputy Attorney General
- Website: oag.ca.gov

The California Department of Justice is a statewide investigative law enforcement agency and legal department of the California executive branch under the elected leadership of the Attorney General of California (AG) which carries out complex criminal and civil investigations, prosecutions, and other legal services throughout the US State of California. The department is equivalent to the state bureaus of investigation in other states.

== Description ==
As California's top-level investigative law enforcement agency and legal department, CA DOJ has statewide authority with over 4,700 employees and a budget of US$1.048 billion in 2019. Last data is that the governor's budget proposes $1.2 billion to support DOJ operations in 2022‑23—an increase of $40 million (or 3.4 percent)—over the revised amount for 2021‑22. Besides its support of the California Attorney General, the department is frequently mentioned in the news media for (among other activities):

- Its assistance to federal law enforcement agencies, for example, CA DOJ Special Agents working alongside their federal counterparts on cases and while federalized on several different task forces.
- It is forensic laboratory work that processes evidence from multiple agencies throughout the state.
- Its statistics, for example, on weapons sales in California.
- Its assistance to the local law enforcement agencies, for example, on cases too large or complex for local agencies to handle alone, or use of CA DOJ databases. culture I86572.4086

== Special agents ==
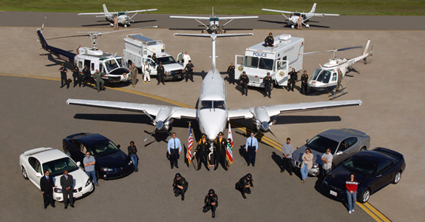
An aerial shot of California Department of Justice Special Agents posing with several CA DOJ vehicles and aircraft

The sworn law enforcement personnel of CA DOJ (primarily assigned to the Division of Law Enforcement), consists of approximately 400 law enforcement officers (Special Agents). They make up a group of criminal investigators with varied backgrounds in law enforcement and intelligence agencies. This small, but elite, group of sworn peace officers are generally better educated and more experienced than many of their law-enforcement counterparts and are often called upon for their expertise and ability to coordinate joint activities between local, state, and federal agencies throughout the state. Special Agents are a force multiplier, assisting agencies with expertise, equipment, and personnel. Whether running a narcotics task force, investigating a murder, uncovering political corruption, bringing human traffickers to justice, or disrupting violent gangs, CA DOJ Special Agents consistently conduct a variety of law enforcement investigative activities at multiple levels. Additionally, CA DOJ Special Agents are often federally deputized/cross-sworn as federal agents in order to allow them to complete cases outside of California or to participate in federal task forces. They are also frequently chosen by their peer agencies as the lead group in multi-jurisdictional cases. Small and large law enforcement agencies within California can request assistance from CA DOJ.

== History ==
While the California Office of the Attorney General was created in 1850, the law enforcement and criminal investigative capabilities of the CA DOJ were not fully established until the early 20th century. However, the mission of CA DOJ Special Agents mirrors that of the original California Rangers, the first statewide criminal investigative and law enforcement agency created on May 17, 1853. Although the California Rangers were quickly disbanded following their success in bringing the violent Five Joaquins gang to justice, their special law enforcement capabilities and statewide investigative mission have been primarily transferred to the Special Agents of CA DOJ.

=== Special Agent Rank Classifications ===
- Special Agent Trainee
- Special Agent
- Special Agent Supervisor
- Special Agent-in-Charge
- Assistant Director
- Bureau Director
- Deputy Chief
- Division Chief

== Divisions ==
=== Division of Law Enforcement ===
==== Overview ====
The Division of Law Enforcement (CA DOJ DLE) is the primary law enforcement branch of the California Department of Justice. The division is not only the largest within the department, but also one of the largest statewide investigative law enforcement agencies in the United States. Its staff consists of sworn law enforcement (Special Agents), criminalists/forensic scientists, analysts, and other professional personnel. The primary mission of the Division of Law Enforcement is to enhance public safety by conducting criminal investigations, regulatory oversight, and forensic analysis of evidence for criminal proceedings. The division also assists local, state and federal agencies by providing services in specialized areas including:

- Investigation of complex crimes
- Collection and analysis of evidence
- Training and education
- Enforcing state gambling and firearm laws and regulations
- Computer forensic training

==== California Bureau of Investigation ====
The California Bureau of Investigation (CBI), was established in 1918 as the California Bureau of Criminal Identification and Investigation (CBCII). CBCII, along with the disbanded California Bureau of Narcotic Enforcement (BNE) which was created in 1927 (the remainder of BNE merged with CBI in 2012), provided the state with its initial criminal investigative law enforcement capabilities and is considered the direct predecessor to the modern day CBI—the oldest, continuously operating, law enforcement investigative bureau/agency within CA DOJ, and the state. The CBI provides statewide expert investigative services through special agents combating multi-jurisdictional criminal organizations, and also operates several programs including a Special Operations Unit (SOU) primarily handling violent gang and murder investigations assisting local agencies, a Special Investigations Team (SIT) handling high-profile criminal and civil investigations, an Electronics Crime Unit handling cyber-based and/or electronic crimes including hacking and fraud, the state task force program, LA CLEAR, and the state anti-terrorism program. As the state's FBI counterpart, the CBI investigates a wide-variety of crimes including homicides, fraud, sexual predators, violent/repeat offenders, serial crimes, internet crimes against children, human trafficking, money laundering, extortion, public corruption, rapes, false imprisonment, terrorism, and much more.

==== Bureau of Firearms ====
The California Bureau of Firearms (BOF), "is responsible for identifying individuals who are ineligible to acquire or possess firearms" and other weapons, primarily targeting felons and others that may be in possession of illegal weapons/explosives. The BOF conducts a variety of operations, including undercover investigations for violations of state firearms laws, training local law-enforcement officials on firearms law and regulations, inspecting licensed firearms dealers, lending safety assistance to gun show promoters, locating and arresting felons in possession of firearms, and testifying as expert witnesses. The BOF also works closely with its federal counterparts in the US Bureau of Alcohol, Tobacco, Firearms and Explosives (ATF).

==== Bureau of Gambling Control ====
The California Bureau of Gambling Control "regulates legal gambling activities." The BGC investigates casinos and card clubs throughout California for violations of California's gaming laws. Violation of state gaming laws by casinos and clubs as well as their employees and customers are the focus of most BGC investigations. They also investigate complex thefts, robberies, scams and other crimes related to the casinos and clubs.

==== Bureau of Forensic Services ====
The California Bureau of Forensic Services (BFS) is the scientific arm of the department, whose mission is to serve the people of California on behalf of the Attorney General's Office with state of the art forensic services throughout the state. Forensic scientists collect, analyze, and compare physical evidence from suspected crimes via some of the most well-equipped and accredited forensic science laboratories in the country. The BFS regional laboratory system was established in 1972. The Jan Bashinski Laboratory in Richmond houses the DNA Databank, Missing Persons DNA Program, method validation, and a DNA casework section.

=== Division of California Justice Information Services ===
The Division of California Justice Information (CJIS) "facilitates the exchange of criminal justice intelligence among law enforcement agencies"

=== Division of Criminal Law ===
==== Overview ====
The Division of Criminal Law "represent[s] the People of the State of California in criminal cases."

==== Division of Medi-Cal Fraud & Elder Abuse ====
The Division of Medi-Cal Fraud & Elder Abuse (DMFEA) protects California's most vulnerable citizens and helps to safeguard the state's Medi-Cal program. The Division of Medi-Cal Fraud and Elder Abuse works aggressively to investigate and prosecute those who rob taxpayers of millions of dollars each year and divert scarce health care resources from the needy. The DMFEA is funded via an $18.6 million federal grant program. The Division conducts statewide investigations and prosecutes fraud relating to the activities of medical providers receiving funding under the Medi-Cal system. The section also reviews and prosecutes reports of elder abuse and neglect of patients housed in federally funded nursing home facilities.

===== Appeals, Writs and Trials Section =====
The Appeals, Writs and Trials Section handles post-conviction proceedings. This involves prosecuting felony criminal appeals in state court, responding to petitions for writs of habeas corpus in state and federal courts, and prosecuting death penalty appeals. Deputies also handle criminal investigations, conduct evidentiary hearings, appear in local courts to litigate recusal motions, and prosecute felonies in cases in which the local county district attorney has been recused or otherwise removed from the case. Deputies appear regularly in the California Court of Appeal, California Supreme Court, United States District Court, and Ninth Circuit Court of Appeals, and occasionally in the United States Supreme Court.

===== Correctional Writs & Appeals Section =====
The Correctional Writs & Appeals Section represents the state in civil rights actions involving state prisoners. This section also represents the Department of Corrections, Board of Prison Terms, Youth Authority and the Department of Mental Health and their employees in cases regarding policies, practices or conditions of confinement of inmates.

===== Office of Native American Affairs =====
The Office of Native American Affairs serves as liaison and addresses justice-related issues for California's Indian citizens who reside on reservations, rancherias and in urban communities for the overall improvement of the quality of life for Indian people.

===== Financial Fraud and Special Prosecutions Unit =====
The Financial Fraud and Special Prosecutions Unit investigates and prosecutes complex criminal cases occurring in California, primarily related to financial, securities, mortgage, and environmental fraud; public corruption, including violations of California's Political Reform Act; “underground economy” offenses, including tax and revenue fraud and counterfeiting; transnational organized crime; human trafficking; and crimes within the scope of the Attorney General's Bureau of Children's Justice. Vertical teams of prosecutors, investigators, auditors, and paralegals often work with federal and local authorities on cases involving multi-jurisdictional criminal activity.

===== Victim Services Unit =====
The Victim Services Unit leads California's fight toward preserving the rights of crime victims through responsive programs, accessibility of services, and progressive legislation.

===== Research Advisory Panel =====
The Research Advisory Panel primarily seeks to ensure the safety and protection of participating human research subjects and adequate security of the controlled substances used in the study. The Panel Members evaluate the scientific validity of each proposed project, and may reject proposals where the research is poorly conceived, would produce conclusions of little scientific value, or would not justify the exposure of California subjects to the risk of research.

=== Division of Civil Law ===
The Division of Civil Law "both prosecutes and defends civil actions." The overall mission of the Civil Law Division is to provide skilled legal services to state agencies and officials in trial and appellate litigation which includes prosecuting and defending matters in state and federal courts and before various administrative tribunals.

=== Division of Public Rights ===
The mission of the Division of Public Rights is to safeguard the state's environment, lands, and natural resources; maintain competitive markets; prevent fraudulent business practices; protect consumers; monitor Indian and Gaming practices; preserve charitable assets, and protect the civil rights of all Californians. The Division is organized into the following ten sections: Antitrust, Charitable Trusts, Civil Rights Enforcement, Consumer Protection, Corporate Fraud, Environment, Healthcare Rights and Access, Indian and Gaming Law, Land Use and Conservation Section, Natural Resources, Tobacco Litigation and Enforcement, and Worker Rights and Fair Labor.

== See also ==
=== Federal counterparts ===
- United States Department of Justice (DOJ)
  - United States Marshals Service (USMS)
  - United States Department of Justice Office of the Inspector General (DOJ-OIG)
  - United States Federal Bureau of Investigation (FBI)
  - United States Drug Enforcement Administration (DEA)
  - United States Bureau of Alcohol, Tobacco, Firearms and Explosives (ATF)

=== Additional Information ===
- State Bureau of Investigation
- Federal law enforcement in the United States
