= Larry Livermore =

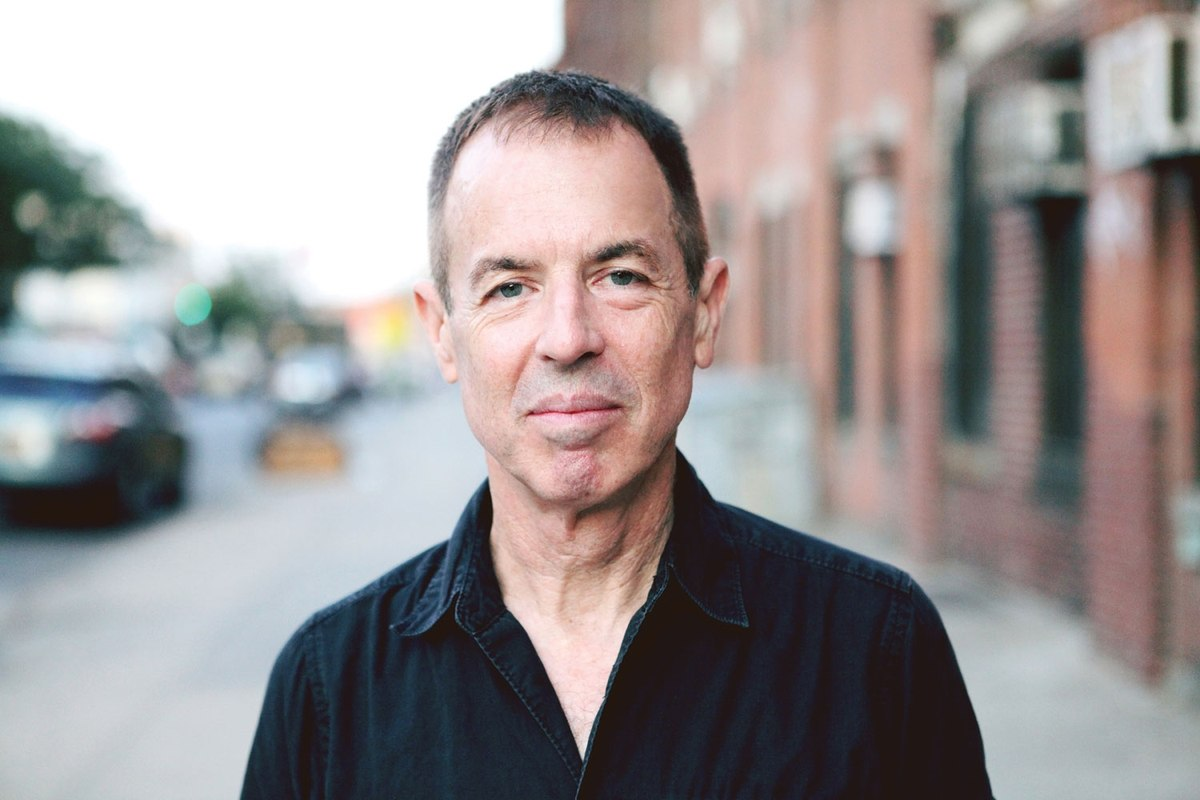
- Livermore in Brooklyn, NY

Background information
- Also known as: Lawrence Livermore
- Born: Lawrence Hayes; October 28, 1947 (age 79); Detroit, Michigan, United States
- Origin: Laytonville, California
- Genre: Punk rock
- Occupations: Singer, musician, record producer, author
- Instruments: Guitar, vocals
- Years active: 1977–present
- Labels: Lookout, Don Giovanni
- Website: larrylivermore.com

Larry Livermore (born Lawrence Hayes on October 28, 1947) is a Canadian-American singer, musician, record producer, and author, best known as the co-founder of Lookout Records.

== Biography ==
Born in Detroit, Hayes developed his musical interests in the Detroit and Ann Arbor scenes, particularly through the music of Motown Records as well as the MC5 and The Stooges. In the 1970s, after living in several parts of the United States, he moved to San Francisco, where began to attend punk rock show and adopted the name Lawrence Livermore, a reference to the Lawrence Livermore National Laboratory, the setting of his unpublished science-fiction novel Mutate or Die. The name was later shortened to “Larry” by fellow punks in the East Bay, including Operation Ivy frontman Jesse Michaels, and the nickname stuck.

In 1984, he founded Lookout magazine, based in Laytonville, California, and continued to publish it until 1995. In 1985, he formed the Lookouts, a punk-rock band whose 12-year-old drummer, Tre Cool, later went on to play for Green Day. The Lookouts recorded two LPs, One Planet One People and Spy Rock Road, and two EPs, Mendocino Homeland and IV, between 1985 and 1990, with Livermore playing guitar and singing.

In 1987, with his friend David Hayes (no relation), he co-founded Lookout Records, which released gold and platinum-selling albums by Operation Ivy and Green Day, as well as scores of releases from other artists. Many of the bands on Lookout were associated with 924 Gilman Street, a nonprofit, volunteer-run punk-rock club based in Berkeley, California. David Hayes left the label at the end of 1989 to establish a label of his own, Very Small Records. Larry Livermore continued as president and principal owner of Lookout Records until he retired and relocated to London in 1997.

In 1992, Livermore, Chris Appelgren, and Patrick Hynes formed the Potatomen, a pop band that has released two albums, Now and Iceland, two EPs, On the Avenue and All My Yesterdays, and a split EP, The Beautiful and Damned/The Day I Said Goodbye, with the Canadian band Cub.

From 1987 until 1994, Livermore was a columnist for Maximum Rocknroll magazine, and from 1994 to 2007 wrote a monthly column for Punk Planet magazine. Livermore had a scene report column on East Bay's punk zine Absolutely Zippo. He was also a contributor to the Anderson Valley Advertiser, Janelle Hessig's zine Tales of Blarg, and the seminal queercore zine Homocore. In 2008, quarterly periodical Verbicide magazine began publishing his column, titled "Beneath the BQE". Livermore's first column for Verbicide appears in issue 23. Unfortunately, Verbicide published just three of Livermore's columns, ceasing print operations after issue 25.

Livermore released his first book, Spy Rock Memories, on Don Giovanni Records in 2013. He released his second book, How to Ru(i)n a Record Label: The Story of Lookout Records, in 2015.

Beginning in 2017, Livermore collaborated with cultural historian Stefano Morello to digitize and make accessible materials from his personal collection, including the full run of Lookout magazine, through the East Bay Punk Digital Archive. A larger body of material from Livermore’s holdings, documenting three decades of his involvement in countercultural movements, was later curated by Morello for institutional preservation and subsequently acquired by Cornell University Library’s Division of Rare and Manuscript Collections.

After two decades living in New York City, in 2023 he moved to Montreal.

== Discography ==
=== With The Lookouts ===
- One Planet One People (LP, Lookout Records, 1987)
- Spy Rock Roads (LP, Lookout Records, 1989)
- Mendocino Homeland (EP, Lookout Records, 1989)
- IV (EP, Lookout Records, 1989)
- Spy Rock Roads and Other Stories (Don Giovanni Records, Lookout Records, 2015)

=== With The Potatomen ===
- On the Avenue (EP, Lookout Records, 1989)
- Now (LP, Lookout Records, 1995)
- The Beautiful and Damned/The Day I Said Goodbye (Split EP with Cub, Lookout Records, 1995)
- All My Yesterdays (EP, Lookout Records, 1996)
- Iceland (LP, Lookout Records, 1997)
