= Ycuá Bolaños =

Paraguayan supermarket chain

Supermercados Ycuá Bolaños
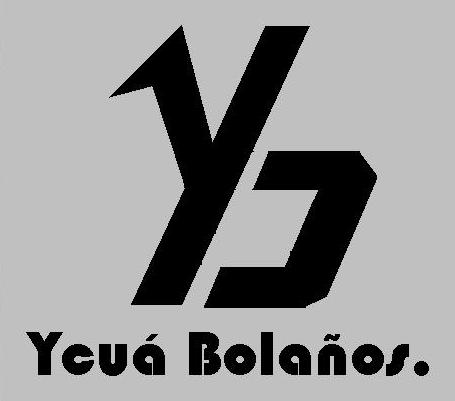
- Type: Private
- Founded: 1987; 39 years ago
- Founder: Juan Pío Paiva
- Headquarters: Asunción, Paraguaya
- Key people: Juan Pío Paiva (owner)
- Products: Supermarkets; Wholesale

Ycuá Bolaños was a Paraguayan supermarket chain, founded in 1987 in Asunción, although its origins date back to 1978, when its founder Juan Pío Paiva opened a butchery. At its apex of expansion, it managed four supermarkets in the Paraguayan capital and operated small production plants which elaborated its own products sold in its stores.

The chain's popularity nosedived after a fire hit its fifth supermarket in 2004, which led to the sale of its four remaining outlets two years later. In the last quarter of 2006, Salemma acquired Ycuá Bolaños III in Los Arcos and Ycuá Bolaños II at Multiplaza, which were renamed Salemma Carmelitas and Salemma Multiplaza, respectively. Both reopened under new management in December 2006. Finally, in 2009, the last remaining supermarket, Ycuá Bolaños I, was renamed Supermercado María's.

== Overview ==
The name Ycuá Bolaños has a symbolic origin. Ycuá came from the Guarani word Ykuá ("water well"), while Bolaños came from the surname of a Franciscan missionary, considered a saint by popular tradition, which came from Spain during the colonial period. The Ycuá Bolaños sanctuary is located in Caazapá, where Juan Pío Paiva was born. Popular belief says that the water of this sanctuary has healing properties.

== Locations ==
=== Ycuá Bolaños I ===
It was founded in 1987, becoming the first merely commercial retail store at the time. It was located at Fernando de la Mora Avenue, on the corner with 12 de Octubre. On 5 December 2006, it was looted by locals following a court ruling which had limited prison terms.

Since 2009, it was branded as "Supermercado María's". It was Ycuá Bolaños' last location, operating as an independent outlet since 2006. Above it was the residence of the Paiva family, also owners of the Botánico location.

=== Ycuá Bolaños II "Multiplaza" ===
It opened in 1997. It was its second supermarket and the first to be formed as a public limited company with elements of the consultancy company Casaccia-Burgos Auditores. It was located near the Eusebio Ayala Avenue, behind Shopping Multiplaza, in the periphery of Asunción. On 18 November 2004, a few months after the fire at the Botánico location, this registered an early sign of a fire at its foot court, which, although controlled on time, the fire generated more mistrust among its customers.

At the end of 2006, this location was handed over to Salemma Retail S.A. and renamed "Salemma Multi Plaza".

=== Ycuá Bolaños III Los Arcos ===
It opened in 1999 and was located on the corner with San Martín Avenue and Centurión Miranda, in the Carmelitas neighborhood of Asunción.

From late 2006, it was renamed "Salemma Carmelitas" after the sale to Salemma Retail. This location was designed with the same errors as the Botánico location, which prompted a redesign of the remaining ones. With the Salemma takeover, its arch-shaped entrance was removed.

=== Ycuá Bolaños V "Botánico" ===
It opened in December 2001, located on the intersection between the Santísima Trinidad and Artigas avenudes, in the Santísima Trinidad neighborhood of Asunción.

On 1 August 2004, it was the location of the largest civil tragedy in Paraguayan history. Around noon, its food court caught fire, which spread to the whole building. The doors were locked under the orders of owner Juan Pío Paiva and his son, Víctor Daniel, which made leaving difficult for the trapped people. The doors were locked in order to prevent the theft of merchandise. Over 400 people died in the tragedy, which caused the fall in the chain's popularity, and had to sell two supermarkets and a store.

Paiva and his son were convicted of negligent homicide for their actions, alongside a security guard who followed their orders.

=== Planned Ciudad del Este supermarket ===
The chain planned to open a new supermarket in Ciudad del Este, but these were scrapped before the fire.
