= Cannabis cultivation =

Process of planting, growing and harvesting cannabis

The cultivation of cannabis is the production of cannabis infructescences ("buds" or "leaves"). Cultivation techniques for other purposes (such as hemp production) differ.

In the United States, all cannabis products in a regulated market must be grown in the state where they are sold because federal law continues to ban interstate cannabis sales. Most regulated cannabis is grown indoors.

Occupational diseases, including asthma, are an emerging concern in the rapidly expanding U.S. cannabis industry. Cannabis cultivation and processing technicians may be exposed to numerous respiratory hazards, e.g. organic particulate matter and dust from ground cannabis flower, mold, bacterial endotoxins, and pesticides. Employees exposed to ground cannabis without adequate controls are at risk of developing occupational asthma which can be fatal.

== Botany ==
Cannabis belongs to the genus Cannabis in the family Cannabaceae. It may include three species, Cannabis indica, C. sativa, and C. ruderalis (APG II system), or one variable species. It is typically a dioecious (each individual is either male or female) annual plant.

C. sativa and C. indica generally grow tall, with some varieties reaching 4 metres or 13 feet. Female plants produce tetrahydrocannabinol (THC) (up to 31% by weight) as the season changes from summer to autumn. C. ruderalis is very short, produces only trace amounts of THC, but is very rich in cannabidiol (CBD) an antagonist to THC, which may be 40% of the cannabinoids in a plant. C. ruderalis flowers independently of the photoperiod with the main factor for flowering being the age of the individual plants. However, commercial cross-bred hybrids containing both ruderalis, indica and/or sativa genes exist (usually called autoflowering).

== Cultivation requirements ==
Cannabis needs certain conditions to flourish.

=== Growth medium ===
Soil is required, except for cannabis grown with hydroponics or aeroponics.

- Sufficient nutrients — commercial potting soils usually indicate this as "N-P-K = x%-y%-z%". This indicates the percentages of fundamental nutritional elements, i.e., nitrogen, phosphorus and potassium. Nutrients are often provided to the soil via fertilizers but such practice requires caution.
- A soil pH between 5.8 and 6.5. This value can be adjusted – see soil pH. Commercial fertilizers tend to make the soil more acidic, although manure has a less pronounced effect.

=== Warmth ===
The optimal day temperature range for cannabis is 24 to 30 °C (75 to 86 °F). Temperatures above 31 °C (88 °F) and below 15.5 °C (60 °F) seem to decrease THC potency and slow growth. At 13 °C (55 °F) the plant undergoes a mild shock, though some strains withstand frost temporarily.

=== Light ===
Sun light or grow light can be used.

Under artificial light, the plant typically remains under a regime of 16–24 hours of light and 0–8 hours of darkness from the germination until flowering, with longer light periods being conducive to vegetative growth, and longer dark periods being conducive to flowering. However, generally cannabis only requires thirteen hours of continuous light to remain in the vegetative stage. The 'Gas Lantern Routine' is an alternate lighting schedule that has proven to be successful for growing cannabis, while saving a significant amount of energy. For optimal health, cannabis plants require a period of light and a period of dark. It has been suggested that, when subjected to a regimen of constant light without a dark period, cannabis begins to show signs of decreased photosynthetic response, lack of vigor, and an overall decrease in vascular development. Typically, flowering is induced by providing at least 12 hours per day of complete darkness. Flowering in cannabis is triggered by a hormonal reaction within the plant that is initiated by an increase in length of its dark cycle, i.e. the plant needs sufficient prolonged darkness for bract/bracteole development (flowering) to begin. Some Indica varieties require as little as 8 hours of dark to begin flowering, whereas some Sativa varieties require up to 13 hours.

=== Water ===
Watering frequency and amount is determined by many factors, including temperature and light, the age, size and stage of growth of the plant and the medium's ability to retain water. A conspicuous sign of water problems is the wilting of leaves. Giving too much water can kill cannabis plants if the growing medium gets over-saturated. This is mainly due to oxygen not being able to enter the root system. Anaerobic bacteria start to accumulate due to waterlogged, stale conditions. They begin to consume plant roots, beneficial (aerobic) bacteria, as well as nutrients and fertilizer. When using soil as a growth medium, the soil should be allowed to dry down adequately before re-watering.

=== Humidity ===
Humidity is an important part of plant growth. Dry conditions slow the rate of photosynthesis. Ideal levels of humidity for optimal growth are 40–60% RH.

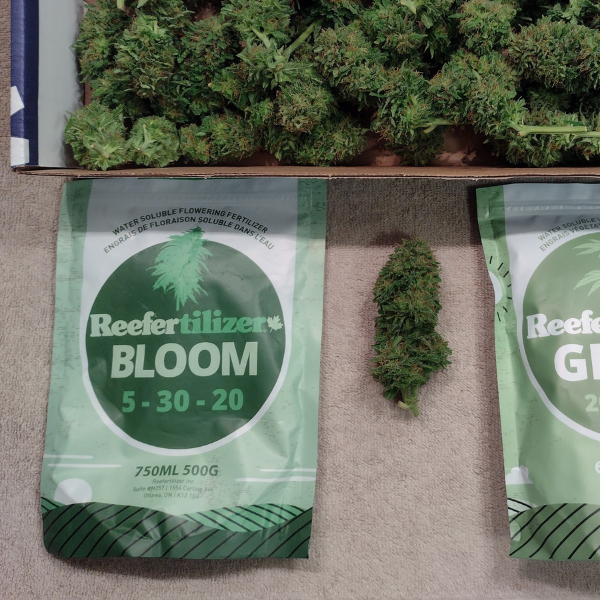
A bag of flowering cannabis fertilizer (Reefertilizer) displaying the NPK 5-30-20

=== Nutrients ===
Nutrients are taken up from the soil by roots. Nutrient soil amendments (fertilizers) are added when the soil nutrients are depleted. Fertilizers can be chemical or organic, liquid or powder, and usually contain a mixture of ingredients. Commercial fertilizers indicate the levels of NPK (nitrogen, phosphorus, and potassium). In general, cannabis needs more N than P and K during all life phases. The presence of secondary nutrients (calcium, magnesium, sulfur) is recommended. Micronutrients (e.g. iron, boron, chlorine, manganese, copper, zinc, molybdenum) rarely manifest as deficiencies.

Because cannabis' nutrient needs vary widely depending on the variety, they are usually determined by trial and error and fertilizers are applied sparingly to avoid burning the plant.

== Stages of development ==
=== Germination ===
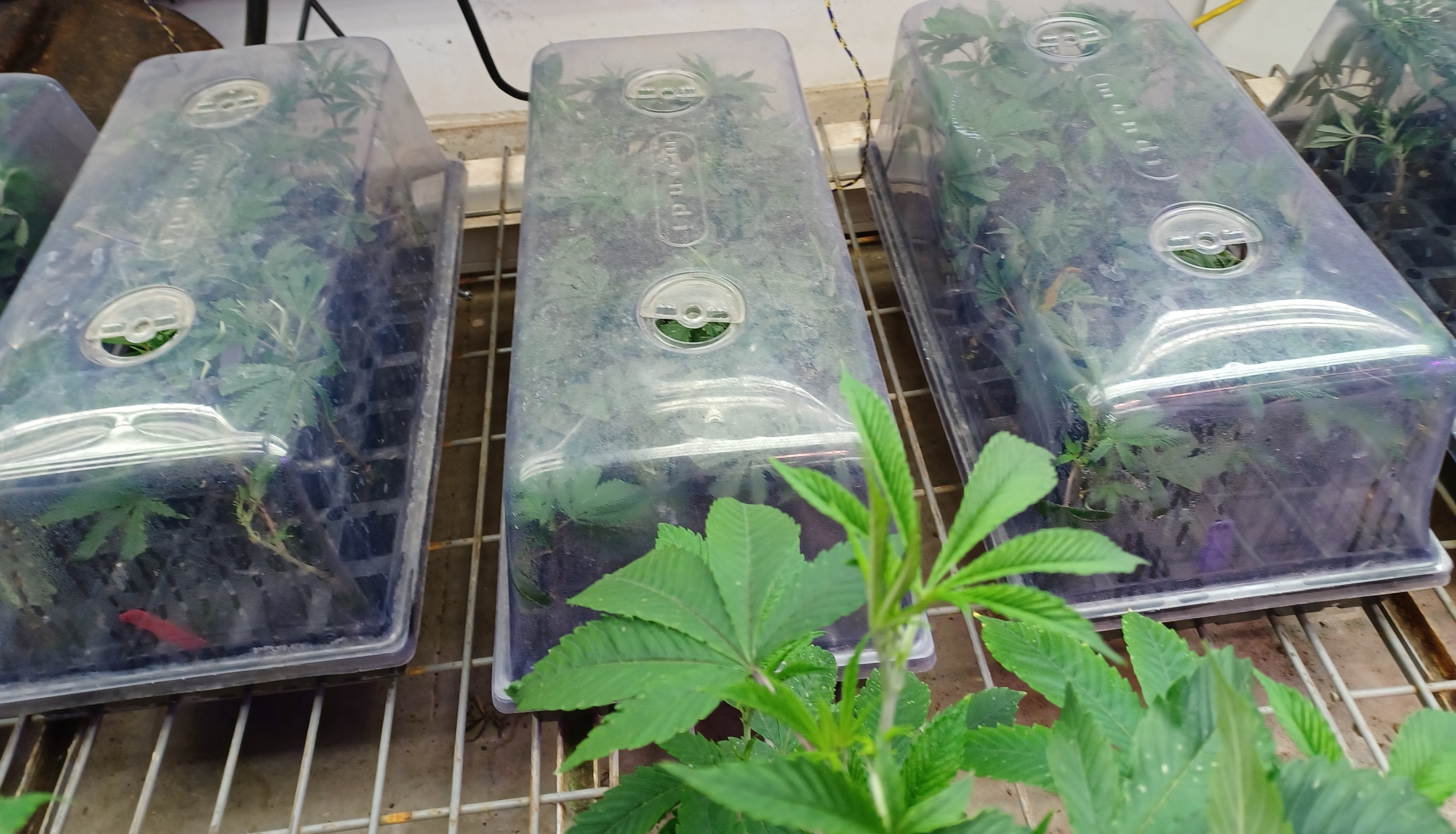
Very young clones in humidity domes

Germination is the process by which a seed sprouts and a root emerges. Germination in cannabis can occur in as little as twelve hours or can take as long as eight days, depending on the cultivar and environmental conditions. Warmth, darkness, and moisture initiate metabolic processes such as the activation of hormones that trigger the expansion of the embryo within the seed. Then the seed coat cracks open and a small embryonic root emerges and begins growing downward (because of gravitropism), if placed in a proper growing medium. Soon (after 2–4 days) the root is anchored and two oval cotyledons (sometimes called "false leaves" or "seed leaves") emerge in search of light and the remains of the seed shell are pushed away. This marks the beginning of the seedling stage.

Peat pellets are often used as a germinating medium because the saturated pellets with their seedlings can be planted directly into the intended growing medium with a minimum of shock to the plant.

- Scarification (artificial), example: Soaking the seeds in boiled water that is cooled down.
- Stratification (natural simulation), example: Soaking seeds either between wet paper towels, in a cup of water at room temperature, in wet peat pellets, or directly in potting soil.

==== Imbibition ====
Imbibition of water through the membrane of the seed shell is the first step in the germination process for cannabis. Dry cannabis seeds are floating, a convenient way to verify a successful imbibition is to put them in water until they sink, which takes about six hours when submerged in an infuser, and about 12 hours when they are floating on water. Seeds that keep floating need scarification in order to absorb water.

=== Seedling ===
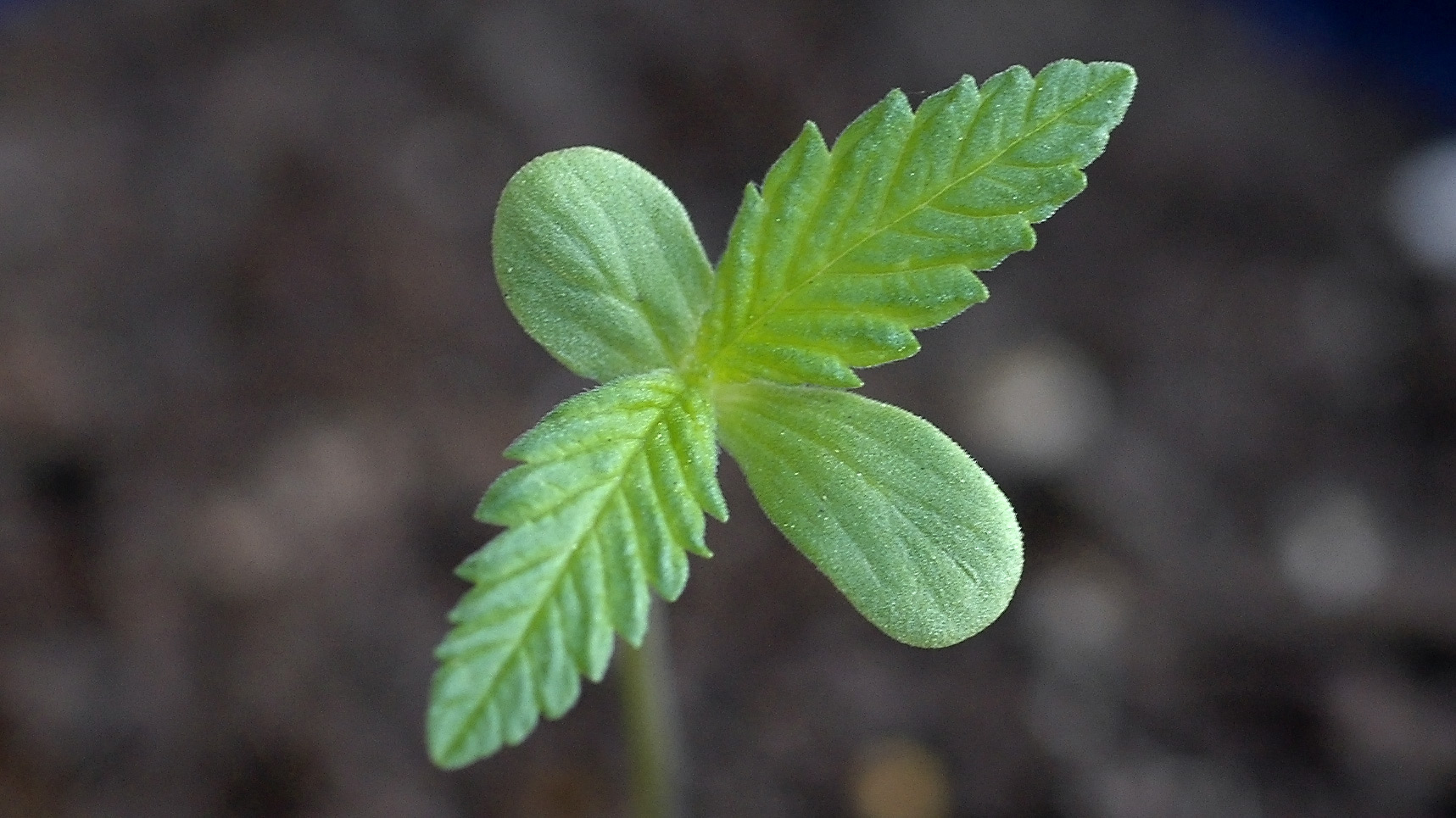
A very young C. sativa seedling. The tips of the first set of rough leaves are emerging between the two round seed leaves (cotyledons).

The seedling stage begins when the seed coat splits open and exposes the root and cotyledons. It lasts from 1 to 4 weeks, and is the period of greatest vulnerability in the life cycle of the plant, requiring moderate humidity levels, medium to high light intensity, and adequate but not excessive soil moisture.

Most indoor growers use compact fluorescent or T5 fluorescent lights during this stage as they produce little heat. High-pressure sodium and metal halide lights produce large amounts of radiant heat and increase the rate of transpiration in the plant which can quickly dry out seedlings with their small root systems.

=== Vegetative ===
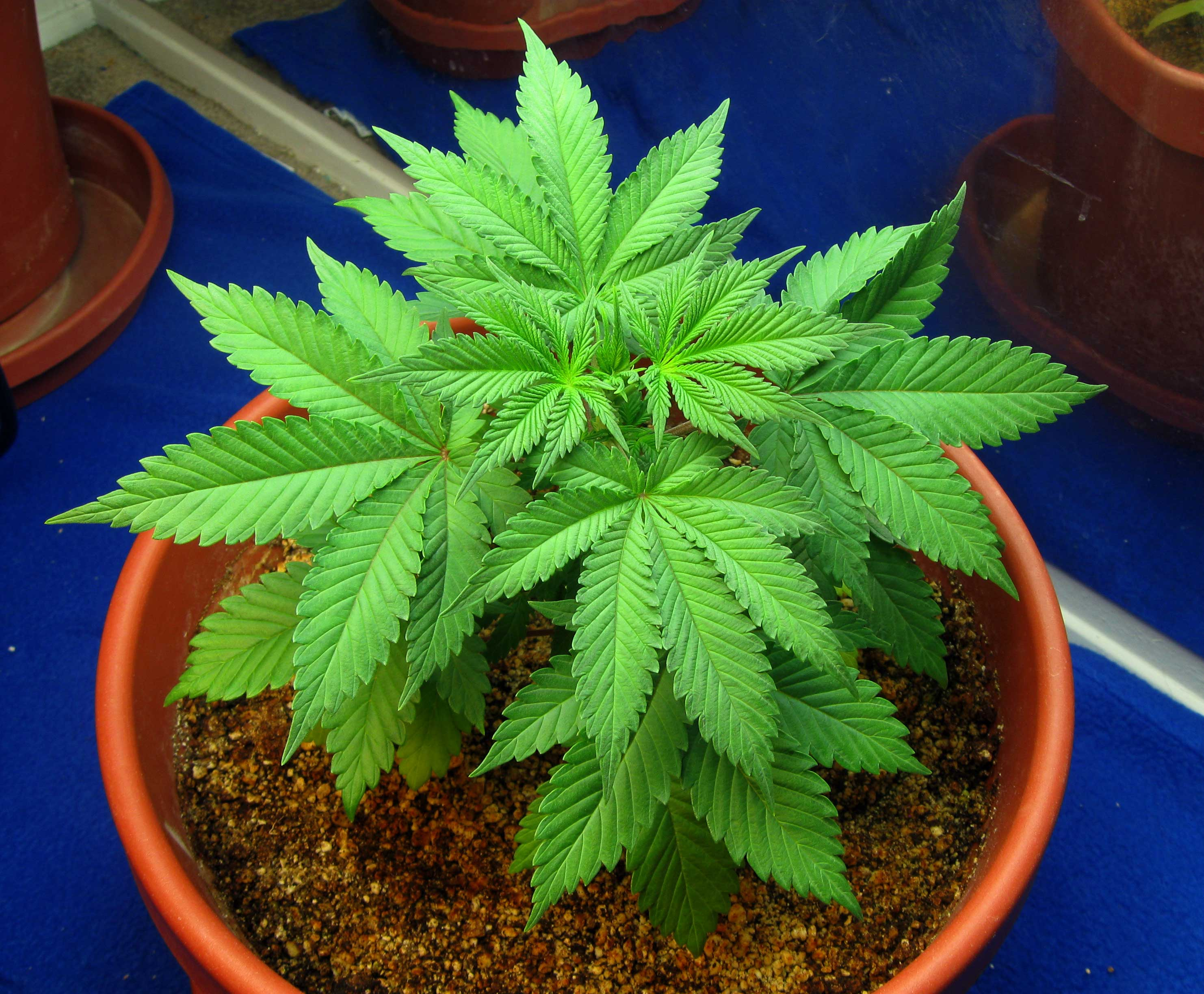
This cannabis plant is being grown in a coco coir medium. It is only making stems and leaves at this point because it is in the vegetative stage.

Duration: 1–2 months indoors. In this stage the plant needs a significant amount of light and nutrients, depending on the genetics of the particular plant. It continues to grow vertically and produce new leaves. The sex is starting to reveal itself, which is a sign that the next stage begins. Concurrently the root system expands downwards in search of more water and food.

When the plant possesses seven sets of true leaves and the 8th is barely visible in the center of the growth tip, or shoot apical meristem (SAM), the plant has entered the vegetative phase of growth. During the vegetative phase, the plant directs its energy resources primarily to the growth of leaves, stems, and roots. A strong root system is required for strong floral development. A plant needs 1 or 2 months to mature before blooming. The plant is ready when it has revealed its sex. Plant size is a good indicator of sex. Females tend to be shorter and branchier due to their raceme type inflorescence than males, whose flowers grow in panicles. The males are then usually culled when they are identified, so that the females will not be pollinated, thus producing parthenocarpic fruits (popularly called "sinsemilla", meaning "without seed").

During the vegetative phase, cultivators generally employ an 18- to 24-hour photoperiod because the plants grow more quickly if they receive more light, although a warmer and cooler periods are required for optimal health. Although no dark period is required, there is debate among cultivators as to whether a dark period is beneficial, and many continue to employ a dark period. Energy savings often support using a dark period, as plants undergo late day decline and therefore lighting during the late night hours is less effective.

The amount of time to grow a cannabis plant indoors in the vegetative stage depends on the size of the flower, the light used, the size of the space, and how many plants are intended to flower at once, and how big the strain gets in "the stretch" (i.e., the first two weeks of flowering).

Cannabis cultivators employ fertilizers high in nitrogen and potassium during the vegetative stage, as well as a complete micronutrient fertilizer. The strength of the fertilizer is gradually increased as the plants grow and become more hardy.

Advanced cultivation methods include:

1. training and trellising techniques such as Screen of Green (also known as SCROG), Sea of Green (also known as SOG) "Super cropping" and LST super cropping; and entire systems and methods such as the NIMBY no-dump method, Hempy Bucket, and the Krusty Freedom Bucket methods. Research into the production of cannabis for the drug Marinol and other more profitable and marketable forms of cannabis-based medicines has further pushed the envelope of cannabis cultivation in all forms of laboratory, both public and private.
2. using a water or air-based growth medium (known as hydroponics and aeroponics respectively)
3. the use of homemade, organic composted fertilizers

The emphasis on advanced cultivation techniques, as well as the availability of hybrid strains (with names like Northern Lights, Master Kush, NYC Diesel), is believed to be a factor in the increase in the overall quality and variety of commercially available cannabis over the past few decades. The Internet in particular has brought together widely diverse genetics from around the world through trading and purchasing. However, well-grown heirloom strains (e.g. island sweet skunk, fruity Thai etc.) are used to produce 1 gram; 1/28 oz per watt (g/W) harvest.

=== Pre-flowering ===
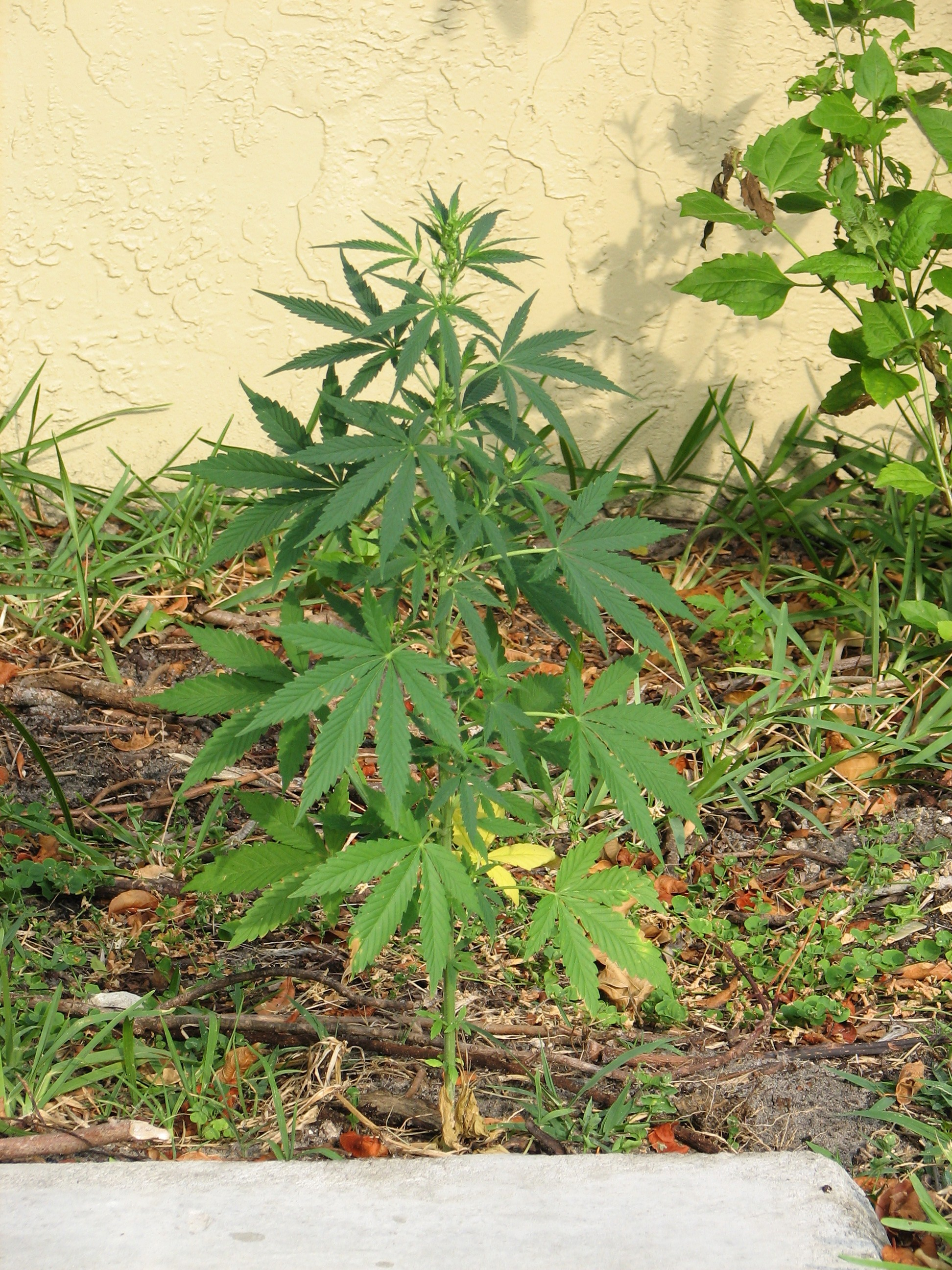
A young male cannabis plant during early flowering stage

Also called the stretch, this takes one day to two weeks. Most plants spend 10–14 days in this period after switching the light cycle to 12 hours of darkness. Plant development increases dramatically, with the plant doubling or more in size. (See reproductive development below.) Production of more branches and nodes occurs during this stage, as the structure for flowering grows. The plant starts to develop bracts/bracteoles where the branches meet the stem (nodes). Pre-flowering indicates the plant is ready to flower.

=== Flowering and fruition ===
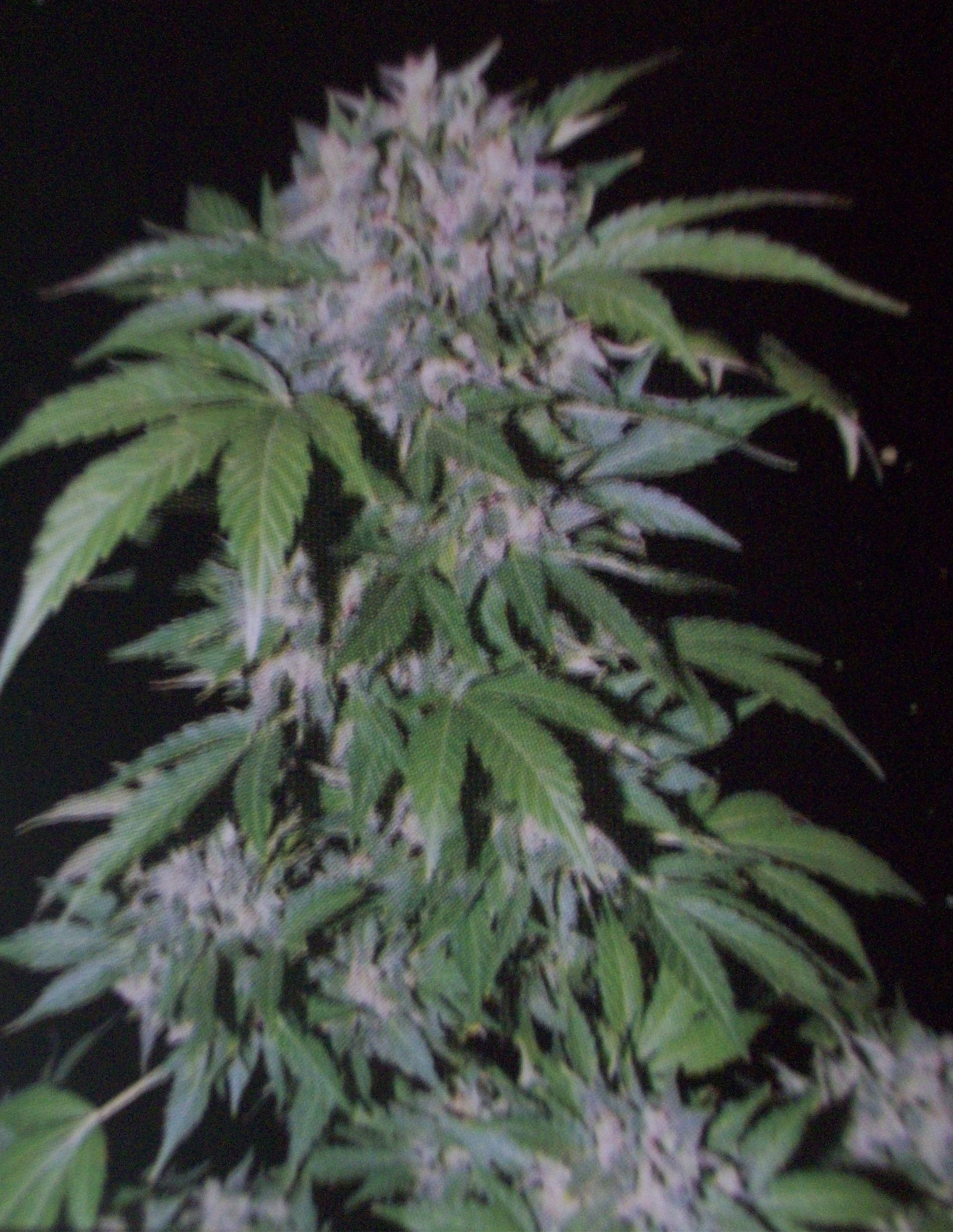
A flowering female cannabis plant

The flowering phase varies from about 6 to 12 weeks for pure indicas with their shorter flowering time than pure sativas. Mixed indica/sativa strains have an intermediate flowering time. The sex is clearly revealed in the first phase, the actual flowering. Males produce little ball-like flowers clustered together like grapes called panicles. Most plants (except auto flowering strains that flower independently of photoperiod) begin to flower under diminishing light. In nature, cannabis plants sense the forthcoming winter as the Earth revolves about the Sun and daylight reduces in duration (see also season). The next phase consists in the fruition (or fruiting): the females inflorescences that were not pollinated (i.e.: fertilized by male pollen) start to produce infructescences that contain sticky white resin-containing glands (or trichomes) in a final attempt for pollination by windborne male pollen. The trichomes produce resins that contain the largest amounts of THC and CBN, the two main psychoactive substances. Fertilized females continue to produce resinous trichomes but more plant energy is consumed by the production of seeds, which can be half the mass of a fertilized bract; thus, to maximize resin by weight, infertile cultivation is preferred.

Inflorescences that produce no seeds are called sin semilla (which translates to "without seeds" in Spanish, and is often misspelled as one word). Potent sin semilla is especially important to medical users, to minimize the amount of cannabis they must consume to be afforded relief. Cannabis with seeds is generally considered to be of inferior quality and/or grown with inferior technique.

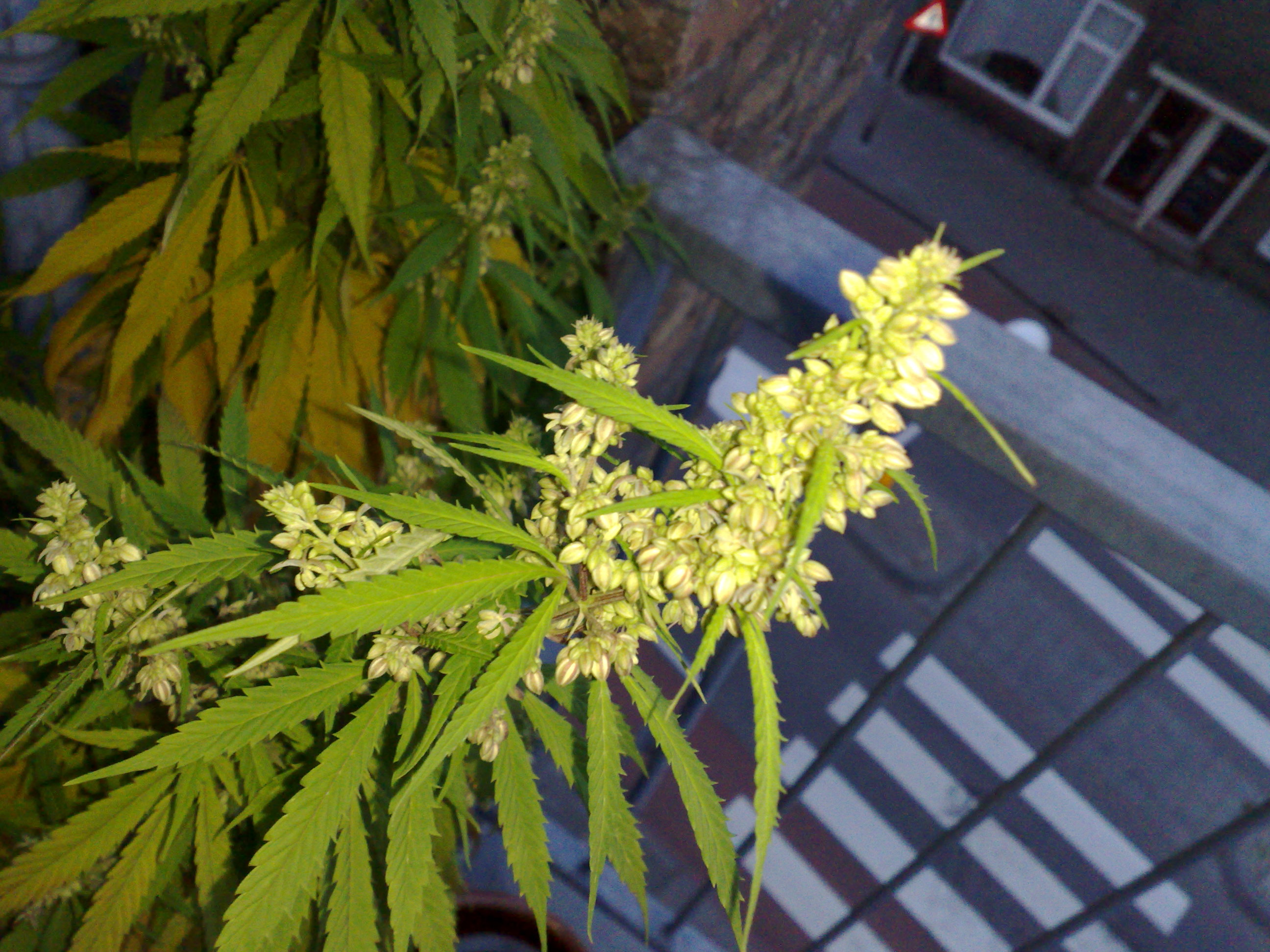
The buds of a male cannabis plant

Cannabis grown is induced into flowering by decreasing its photoperiod to at least 10 hours of darkness per day. In order to initiate a flowering response, the number of hours of darkness must exceed a critical point. Generally the more hours of darkness each day, the shorter the overall flowering period but the lower the yield. Conversely, the fewer hours of darkness each day, the longer the overall flowering period and the higher the yield. Traditionally, most growers change their plants lighting cycle to 12 hours on and 12 hours off since this works as a happy medium to which most strains respond well. This change in photoperiod mimics the plant's natural outdoor cycle, with up to 18 hours of light per day in the summer and down to less than 12 hours of light in fall and winter. Some 'semi-autoflowering' strains that have been bred exclusively for outdoor use, particularly in outdoor climates such as that of the UK, will start flowering with as much as 16–17 hours of light per day. Usually they can start flowering in July and finish far earlier than other strains, particularly those that haven't been bred as outdoor strains. Semi-autoflowering strains can be harvested before the weather in northern latitudes becomes very wet and cold (generally October), whereas other strains are just finishing flowering, and may suffer from botrytis (grey mold) caused by wet weather. Alternatively growers may artificially induce the flowering period during the warmer months by blacking out the plants for 12 hours a day i.e. by covering the plants with black plastic for example, which excludes all light during this period so the plant can flower even during long days.

Although the flowering hormone in most plants (including cannabis) is present during all phases of growth, it is inhibited by exposure to light. To induce flowering, the plant must be subject to at least 8 hours of darkness per day; this number is very strain-specific and most growers use 12 hours of darkness.

Flowers from certain plants (e.g. cannabis) are called bract/bracteole, and are (with cannabis) the most prized part of the plant. During the late period, the bract/bracteole are easily visible to the naked eye. Bract/bracteole development begins approximately 1–2 weeks after the photoperiod is reduced. In the first weeks of flowering a plant usually doubles in size and can triple. Bract/bracteole development ends around 5 weeks into flowering and is followed by a period of bract/bracteole "swelling". During this time the buds greatly increase in weight and size.

== Outdoor cannabis cultivation ==
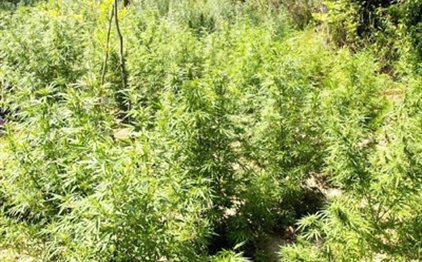
Guerrilla cannabis plot in a forest clearing

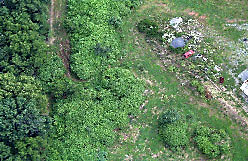
Aerial view of guerrilla cannabis plot

Cannabis can be grown outdoors, either on natural soil or in pots of pre-made or commercial soil. Some strains perform better than others in outdoor settings, an attribute that depends on different conditions, variables and aspects. Outdoor marijuana strains, like most other strains, can be bought in numerous locations and over a hundred different cannabis strains that are bred for outdoor growing exist—many of these outdoor cannabis seeds are simply copies of other pre-existent strains or seeds with different names and descriptions.

To generate optimum quantities of THC-containing resin, the plant needs a fertile soil and long hours of daylight. This means THC production for outdoor growth occurs optimally anywhere within 35° of the equator. Typical growing regions include Mexico, Nepal, Northern India, many parts of Africa, Afghanistan, the United States and Australia.

In most places of the subtropics, cannabis is germinated from late spring to early summer and harvested from late summer to early autumn.

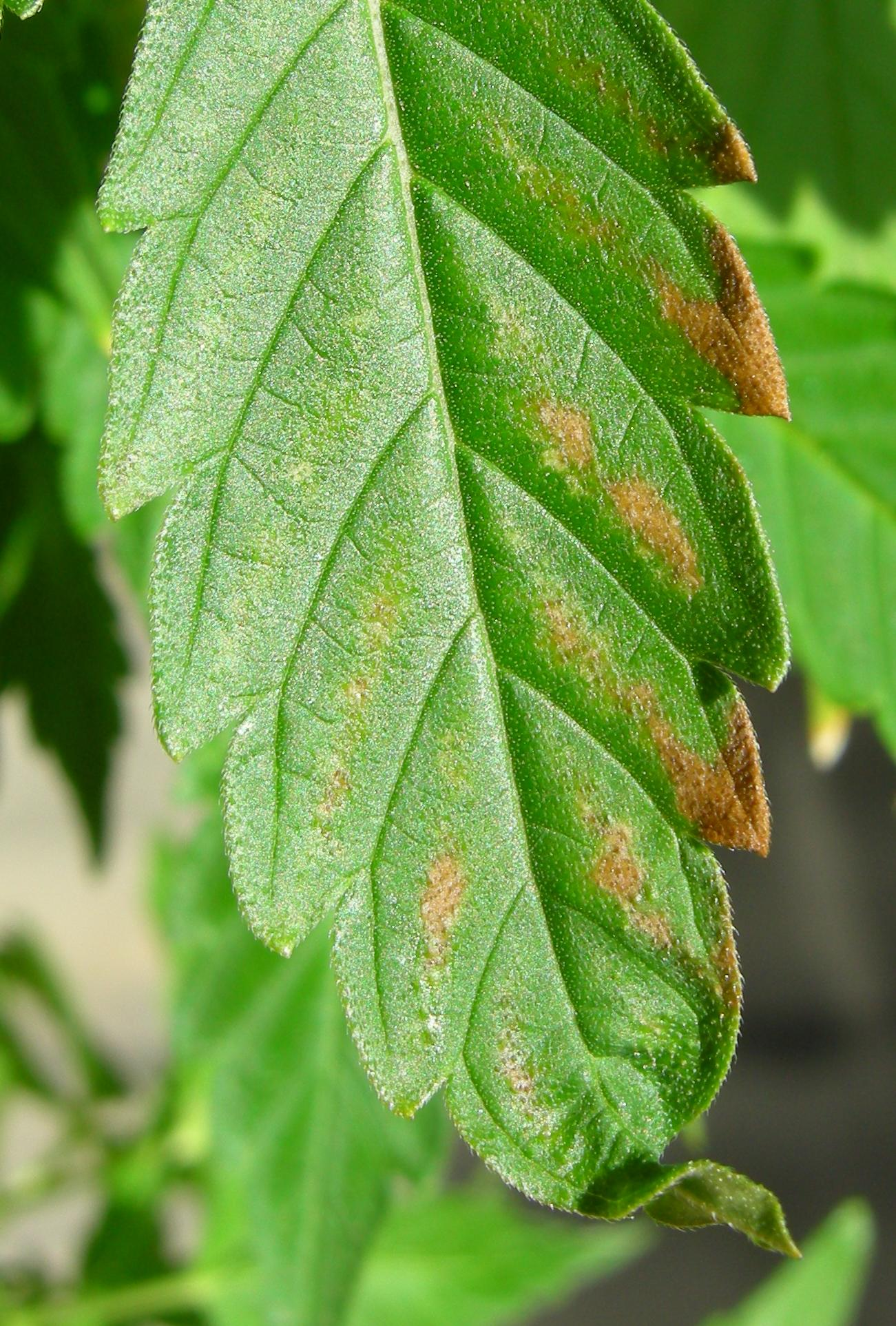
Fertilizer burn on a leaf

Outdoor cultivation is common in both rural and urban areas. Outdoor cultivators tend to grow indica-based strains because of its heavy yields, quick maturing time, and short stature. Some growers prefer sativa because of its clear-headed (cerebral) high, better response to sunlight, and lower odor emissions. Growers cultivate on their own property or practice guerrilla farming i.e. to plant cannabis in remote areas such as forest clearings or mountain cliffs which they rarely visit. However, such a method is prone to theft – so much so that some growers even attach pots to trees to decrease this possibility. Guerrilla growing has given birth to the activist movement Operation Overgrow, where the plant is grown with the explicit purpose of introducing the cannabis plant into the natural ecosystem.

For outdoor cultivation, growers choose areas that receive twelve hours or more of sunlight a day. In the Northern Hemisphere, growers typically plant seeds in mid-April, late May, or early June to provide plants a full four to nine months of growth. Harvest is usually between mid-September and early October. In North America, northern locations are preferred (North Coast of California and British Columbia being particularly notable), but southern locations (such as Maui, Hawaii) are also known to be good producers.

Regulations permitting outdoor cultivation of cannabis vary from state to state in the US. Illinois bans outdoor cultivation and requires growing in an enclosed and locked facility. Other states, like Michigan or Alaska, leave decisions about outdoor growing up to local governments. California, Vermont, and Massachusetts provide licenses for outdoor cultivation, often tiered based on size of operation. Vermont and Alaska also impose security restrictions on outdoor operations such as video surveillance, lack of visibility from roadways, and physical barriers.

Where local laws do not permit growing cannabis, cultivators sometimes grow in forests or rugged and rural areas where the local population is unlikely to find the crop. Cannabis is also grown hidden by a crop that is taller, such as maize. This is reported by the United States government to be common in the midwestern states. Bamboo and elderberry are also used as camouflage companion plants.

Some government agencies, including the Drug Enforcement Administration (DEA), have claimed that in State and National Parks people have been injured by cannabis farmers protecting their crops using booby traps; no arrests or convictions for this had been made as of 2007.

== Indoor cannabis cultivation ==
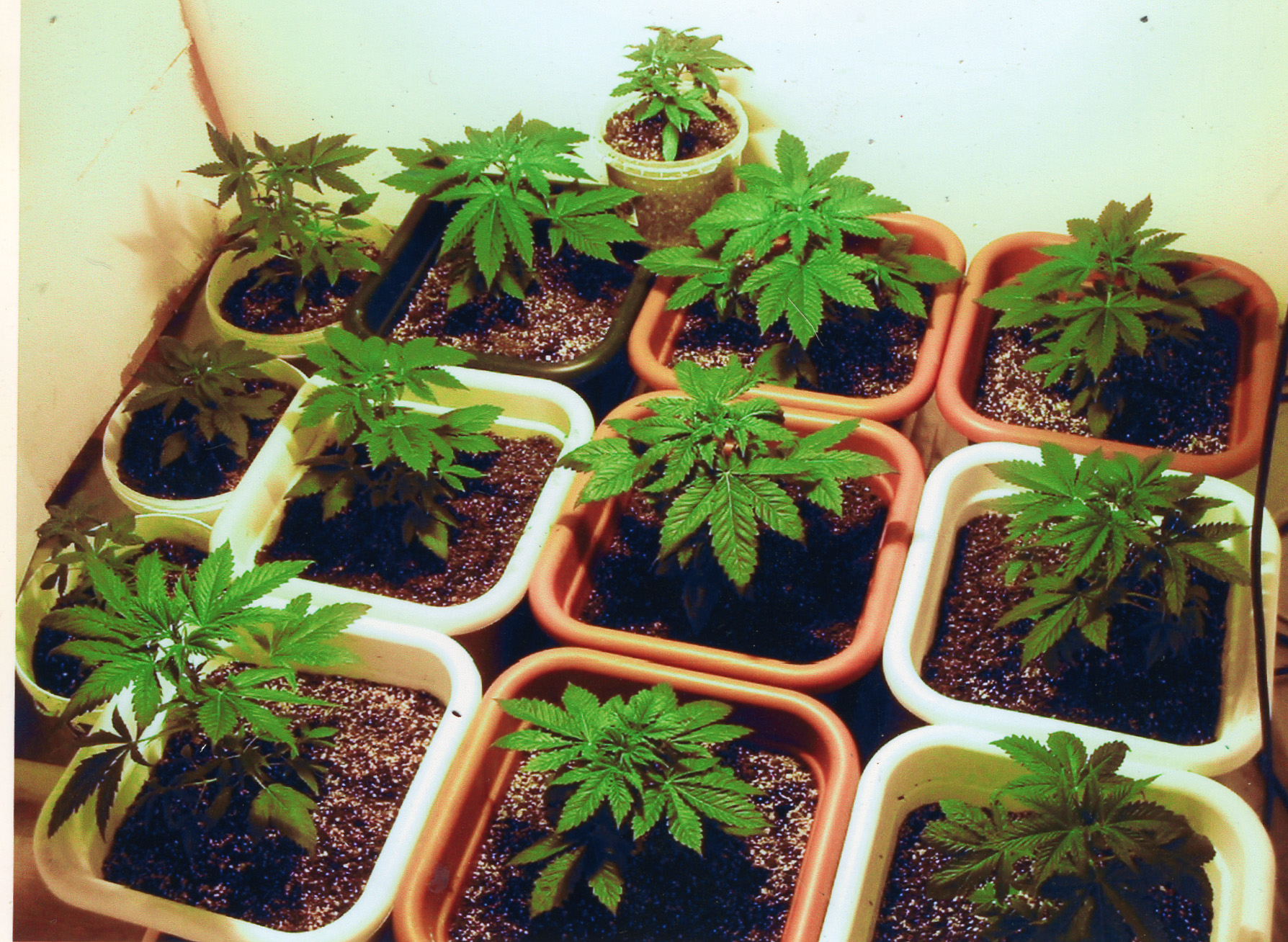
Indoor cannabis cultivation

Cannabis can be grown indoors in a soil-like medium under artificial light, adding plants are given water. Cultivating cannabis indoors is more complicated and expensive than growing outdoors, but it allows the cultivator complete control over the growing environment. Plants of any type can be grown faster indoors than out due to 24-hour light, additional atmospheric CO_{2}, and controlled humidity which allows freer CO_{2} respiration.

Plants can also be grown indoors through the use of hydroponics.

To grow plants indoors, a growing medium (e.g. soil or growing substrate), water, nutrients, light and air need to be supplied to the plant (with the exception of aeroponic cultivation, in which case a growing medium is not required).

=== Supply of light ===
There are several different plant grow lights available. Currently the best source of light for cannabis remains to be metal halide or ceramic metal halide in the range of 3-4000k. Cannabis plants also require both dark and light photoperiods, so the lights need a timer to switch them on and off at set intervals. The optimum photoperiod depends on each plant (some prefer long days and short nights and others preferring the opposite, or something in between).

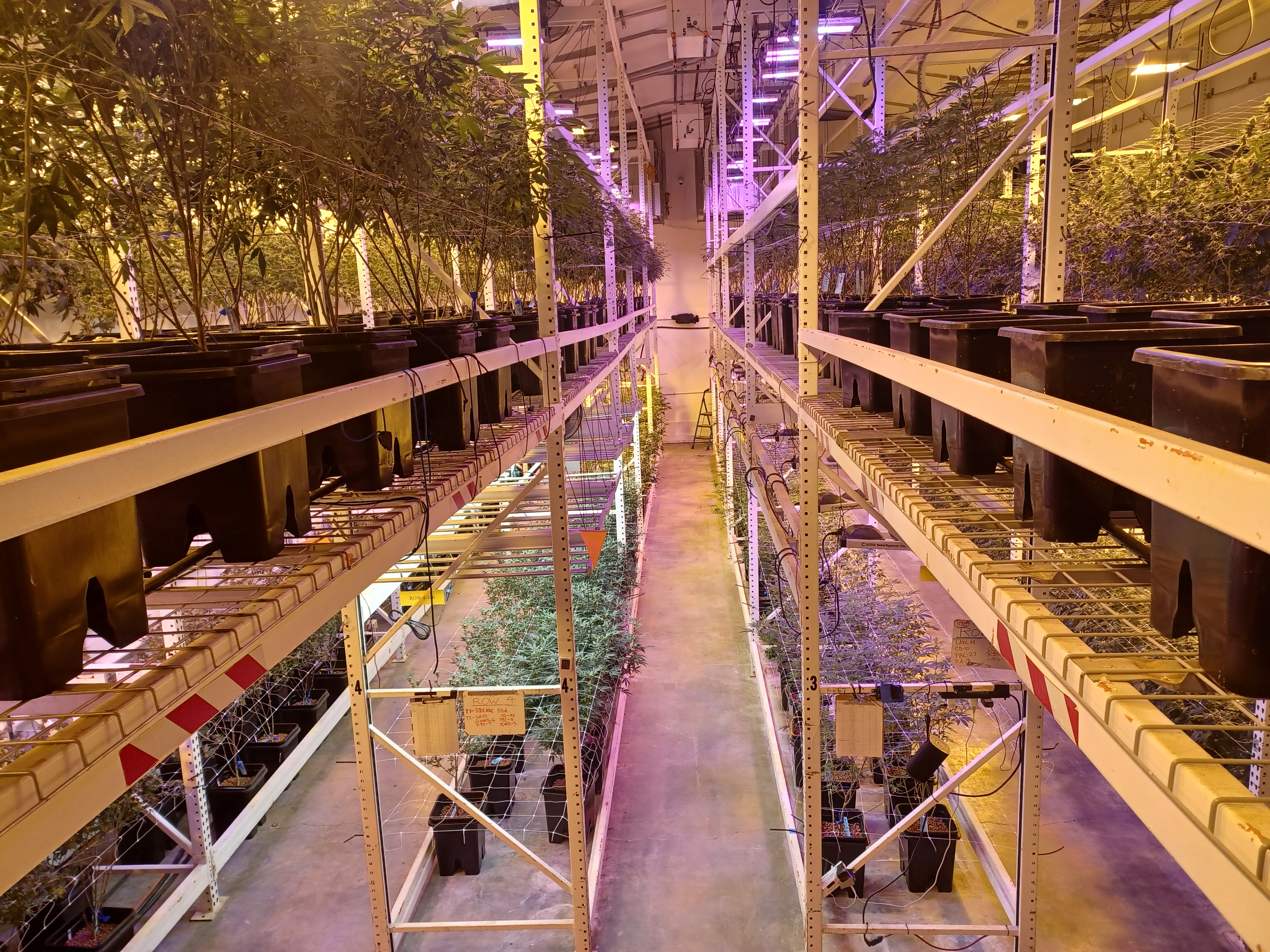
Vertical farming flowering room with different light types, including double-ended HPS lamps and LEDs.

Recent advancements in LED technology have allowed for diodes that emit enough energy for cannabis cultivation. These diodes can emit light in a specific nanometer range, allowing for total control over the spectrum of the light. LEDs are able to produce all of their light in the photosynthetically active range (PAR) of the spectrum.

Reflectors are often used in the lamps to maximize light efficiency. At a medium growing density of 15 plants and 430 watts per square meter, electricity costs are not insignificant. Plants or lights are moved as close together as possible so that they receive equal lighting and that all light coming from the lamps falls upon the plants. Maximum efficiency can be obtained by creating a slightly concave canopy such that the periphery and centre of the canopy are both at the optimum distance from the light source. Often, the distance between lamp and plant is in the range of 0.6 m (2 ft) with high pressure sodium lamps, to 10 cm (4 in) with other lamps, such as compact, large and high-output fluorescent lamps. With proper cooling any light type can be moved extremely close to plants to combat the inverse square law, but there are reasons to keep some distance from the canopy regardless of heat concerns; excessive light can cause bleaching of the plant material and the total canopy area contacted by light is decreased as the source is moved closer. Maximum efficiency should be obtained by maximizing the average light intensity (measured in PAR watts) per square foot times the number of square feet of plant matter contacted. Some cannabis cultivators cover the walls of their grow-room with some type of reflective material (often Mylar or Visqueen), or alternatively, white paint to maximize efficiency.

One commonly used covering is 150 μm (6 mils) PVC plastic sheeting that is white on one side and black on the other. The plastic is installed with the white side facing into the room to reflect light, and the black facing the wall, to reduce fungus and mold growth. Another common covering is flat white paint, with a high titanium dioxide content to maximize reflectivity. Some growers consider Mylar sheeting to be very effective when it lines grow room walls, along with Astrofoil (which also reflects heat), and Foylon (a foil-laminated, reinforced fabric).

=== Control of the atmosphere ===
When growing indoors, the cultivator should maintain as close to an ideal atmosphere inside the grow-room as possible. The air temperature should be maintained within a specific range, typically with deviations no larger than 10 °C (18 °F) with a cooler night and warmer day. Adequate levels of CO_{2} must be maintained for the plants to grow efficiently. It is also important to promote vigorous air circulation within the grow room, which is usually accomplished by mounting an extraction fan and one or more oscillating fans. Power supplies that can be unscrewed from lamp luminaires can be placed outside grow tents to reduce the temperature a bit.

Assuming adequate light and nutrients are available to plants, the limiting factor in plant growth is the level of carbon dioxide (CO_{2}). Ways of increasing carbon dioxide levels in the grow-room include: bottled carbon dioxide, carbon dioxide generators, a milk jug and yeast solution (in which yeast grows in a container thereby emitting CO_{2}), a baking soda and vinegar mixture in a container, or dry ice.

Certain plants (e.g. most strains of cannabis) emit a distinctive odor during their reproductive phase. This presents difficulties to those who are cultivating in places where it is illegal, or for growers who may prefer discretion for other reasons. The most common way of eliminating odor is by pulling odorous air through a carbon filter. Many cultivators simply attach a large carbon filter to their air extraction system, thereby filtering any smell before the air is expelled from the grow-room. Another way of eliminating odor is by installing an ozone generator in the extraction ducting. The air is forced past the ozone generator by the extraction fan, and the odorous air is neutralized as it mixes with the ozone; however the cultivator must ensure that the air is thoroughly mixed before it is expelled outside, lest some odor escape. Care must be taken to prevent excessive ozone concentrations in the garden itself, or where it might be inhaled by the grower or their family. Ozone itself has a distinctive smell and is harmful to living things, although the molecule breaks down quickly (20 minutes to an hour) in atmospheric conditions.

Indoors there are numerous configurations that people utilize to grow quality cannabis. Some growers will convert an entire room or closet, making it devoted to growing cannabis. A relatively new configuration involves the use of grow tents. These are plastic or metal framed tents which are covered in a strong flexible reflective plastic and have light proof zipper doors. Tents come in all sizes and many already have holes for exhaust fans/ducting as well as mounts for HID lamps.

Some growers will construct grow cabinets made out of an old refrigerator, cabinet, dresser drawer or similar.

=== Popularity and extent ===
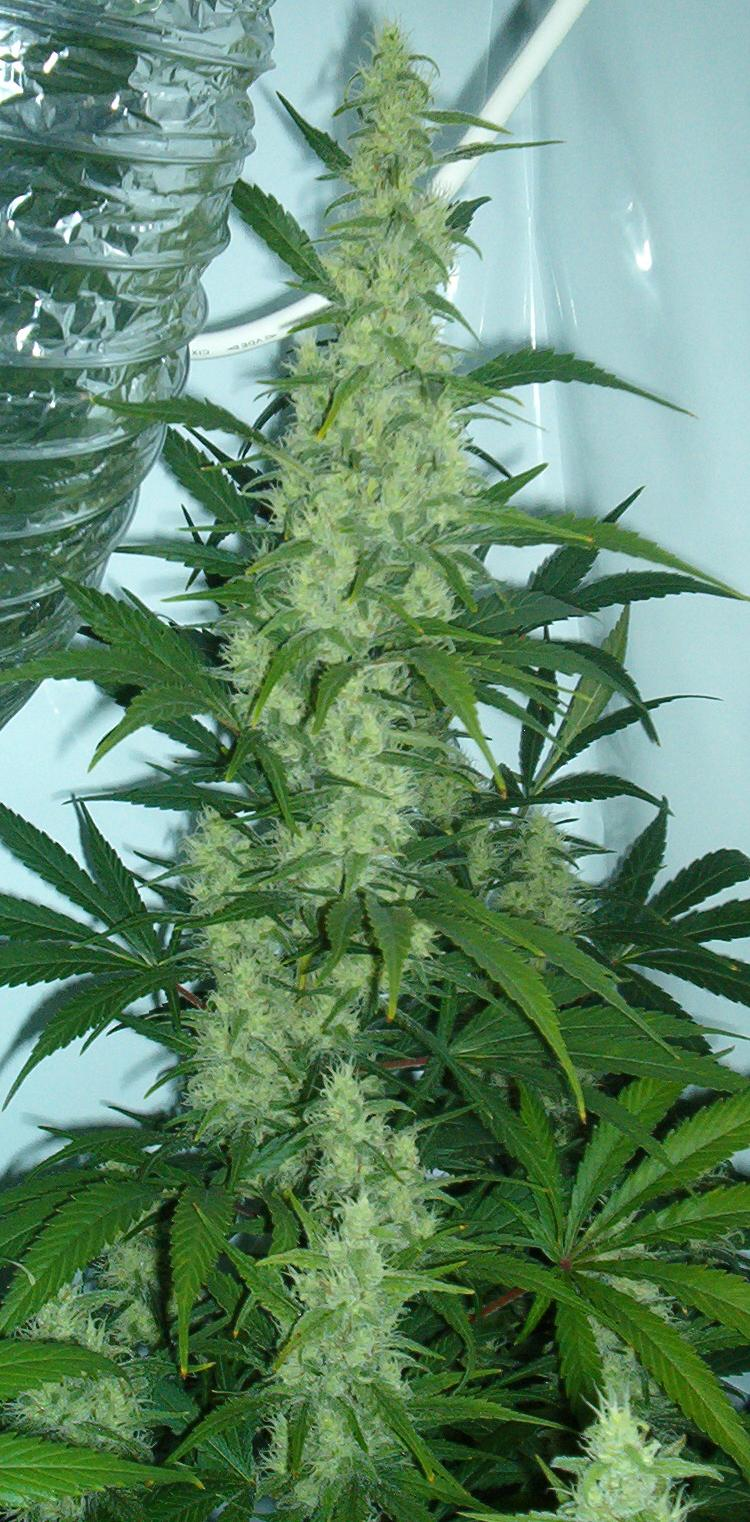
Indoor cannabis plant during flowering

Indoor growing became increasingly common when equipment, seeds and instructions on how to cultivate became widely available. So-called grow-ops (growing operations, often located in grow houses) are seen by many marijuana enthusiasts as a much cheaper way to gain a steady, higher-quality supply of cannabis. On a larger scale they have proven a viable commercial venture, with some law enforcement agencies finding grow-ops large enough to yield several kilograms (pounds) of cannabis. More expansive grow-ops are generally more susceptible to detection than smaller operations.

In the UK, so much cannabis is grown in illegal facilities that the UK is an exporter of cannabis. After cannabis as a drug was rescheduled as a Class B drug in 2008 (see below), more people started reporting on their suspicions of illegal operations and in 2009-2010 almost 7000 illegal facilities were found by police in one year. Vietnamese teenagers are trafficked to the United Kingdom and forced to work in these facilities. When police raid them, trafficked victims are typically sent to prison.

Because individual grow light power generally ranges from 250 watts to 1000 watts or more and because the lights remain lit for a long time each day, differences in utility bill costs are a significant security issue. Power companies inform law enforcement if they see a significant increase in power usage relative to a household's previous electricity costs or if power is being stolen by bypassing the meter. Employing energy saving methods is a common way to alleviate this, for instance; switching off light bulbs when leaving rooms, purchasing energy efficient appliances, using TVs or computers less, buying lower power light bulbs and so forth.

Some plants (e.g. cultivars of C. sativa subsp. indica), can give off strong odors as they grow, resulting in detection of illegal growing operations. Growers frequently use carbon scrubbers and ventilation to control odors. This typically involves forcing air from the grow room through a device containing activated carbon, then venting it outdoors. Others use an ozone generator. Ozone reacts with odor molecules in the air, permanently eliminating them. However, ozone can build up to levels that may be hazardous both for grower and plant. As a last resort, keeping windows firmly shut and using strong air fresheners can control smells. Checking outside to see if any smells are emanating from indoors is often a necessary precaution, as many growers become acclimated to the smell, and fail to realize just how pervasive the odor may be. Many store plants in more isolated areas such as a basement or attic to prevent smell detection. Another less common solution is to simply grow a strain with a weaker odor.

Storing plants and lights away from windows and areas that visitor may see is also common, as is keeping the plants in an attic or basement. Some growers, finding this impractical, may cover windows with light-resistant materials. This can solve the problem of escaping bright light but may arouse suspicion amongst neighbors and local residents.

Many cultivators face the risk of fire. Fires normally originate from faulty electrical equipment or wiring. Shoddy fixtures and sockets, improperly grounded equipment, and overloaded circuit breakers are some of the most prevalent causes. Because of the large amount of electricity needed for large-scale cultivation, old or damaged wiring is prone to melt and short. Some black market growers steal power to hide electricity use, and many do not ensure that their wiring is safe. Many growers adapt light cycles so that the lights are on when they are home and off when they are away.

Another fire hazard is plants making contact with hot HID bulbs. Growers using fluorescent bulbs with reasonable air circulation do not have this problem. Word of mouth can be as much a threat to growers as any of the above issues. Often, a few sentences of conversation overheard can result in a tip-off and thus speedy detection. It is for this reason that many growers are reluctant to talk about their cultivation.

== Harvesting, drying and curing ==
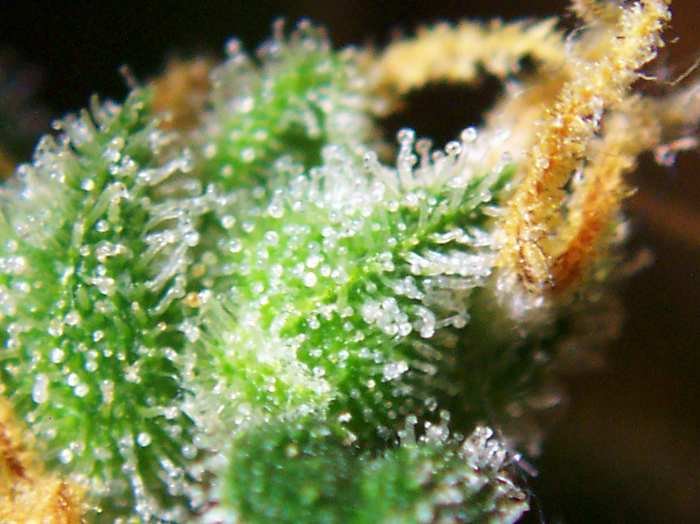
Close-up of a female cannabis bud in flowering stage. White trichomes can be seen coating the surface, which darken as flowering progresses.

There may be different goals when harvesting a plant:

- Seeds are harvested when fully developed and often after the accompanying buds have begun to deteriorate.
- Hemp grown for fiber is harvested before flowering,
- Cannabis grown for cloning is not allowed to flower at all.
- Cannabis grown for smoking

A typical indicator that a plant is ready to be harvested for smoking, is when 50% to 70% of trichomes have turned cloudy and 70% of the pistils have turned a reddish brown/amber.

In general, harvesting consists of drying and curing. Curing is an oxidization and polymerization process which takes place in sealed containers of cannabis, over time.

- Dry: Buds placed in a controlled atmosphere for removing moisture content
- Cure: Buds stored in sealed container and left in dark place

Ripeness is defined as the point where THC and other cannabinoid production has reached maximum levels, but before cannabinoids have begun to degrade/breakdown. This is seen under a 30–60x microscope by examining the trichomes on the flowers. When trichomes are undeveloped they are completely clear. They turn white/cloudy which is when trichomes have max levels of cannabinoids. Eventually trichomes start turning amber/purple/red, which is when cannabinoid content has started to degrade. Harvesting before most trichomes have turned white may reduce the overall potency and efficacy time. Harvesting too late (past 90% amber) produces more of a sleepiness effect as the THC degrades to CBN.

Some growers use a brix to measure "sugar" content.

=== Drying ===
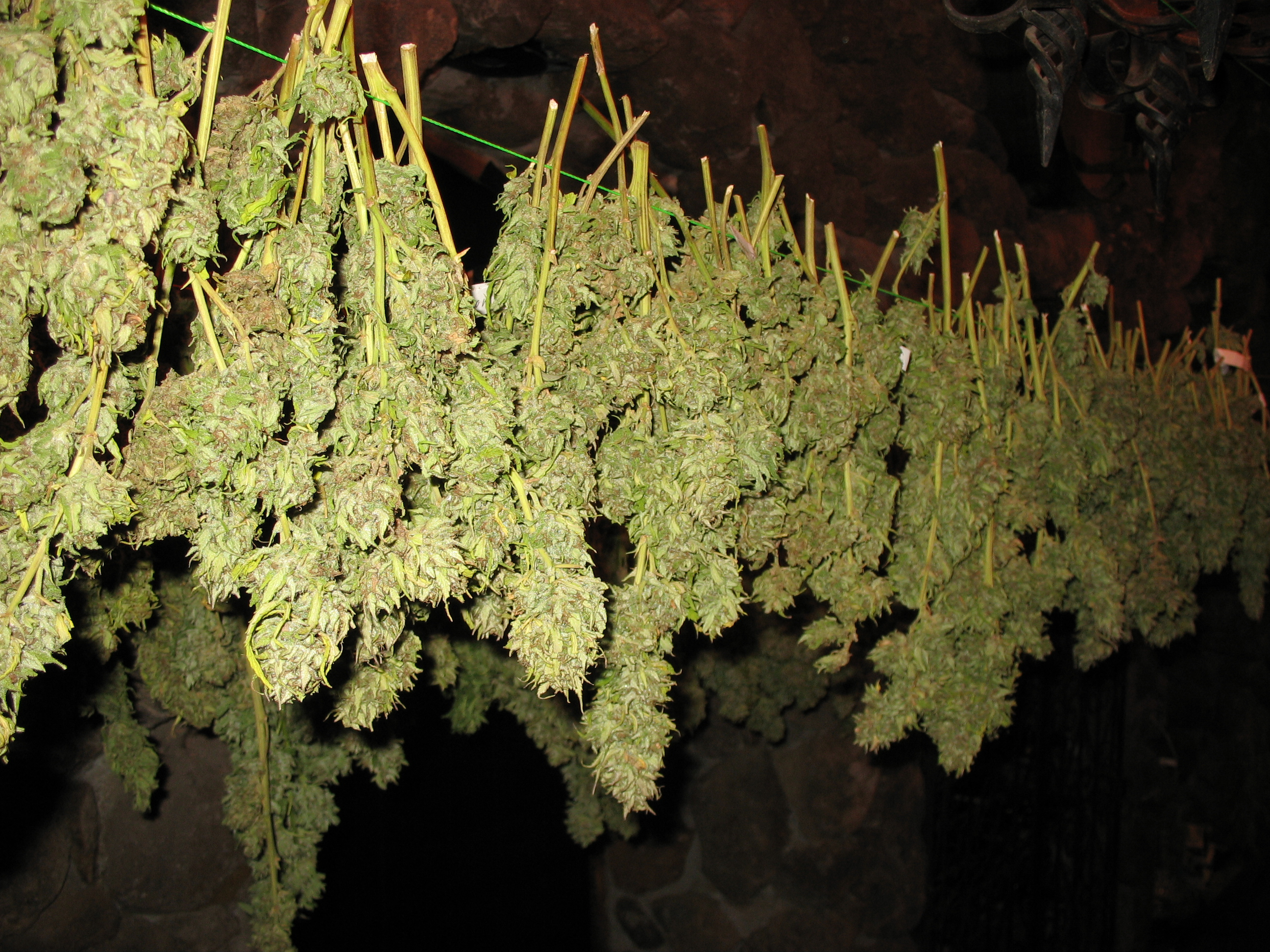
Drying cannabis buds

The plants are dried at room temperature in a dark space. It is actually optimal to keep the temperature between 60 and 70 °F (16 and 21 °C) because many terpenoids (molecules that are partially responsible for the psychoactive effects but also largely responsible for the odor of the plant) evaporate at temperatures beyond 70 °F (21 °C). This process can take from a few days to two weeks, depending on the size and density of the buds and the relative humidity of the air. Humidity should be kept between 45% and 55% humidity. Higher humidity will create a mold and mildew risk, while lower humidity will cause the material to dry too quickly. If the plant material dries too quickly, some of the chlorophyll will fail to be converted to a different chemical form which will result in a sub-optimal taste and a harsher smoke when combusted and inhaled. Stable temperature preserves cannabinoids well. Some believe flowers should be hung by their stalks, allowing the internal fluids of the plant to remain in the flowers. Others believe the cut stem is simply a handy non-sticky place from which to hang the plant. Roots are removed, and when the stems in the middle of the largest buds can be snapped easily, the plant is considered dry enough to be cured. Drying is done in a dark place, as THC resins deteriorate if exposed to light and the degradation product CBN forms, significantly altering the cannabinoid profile of the dried flowers.

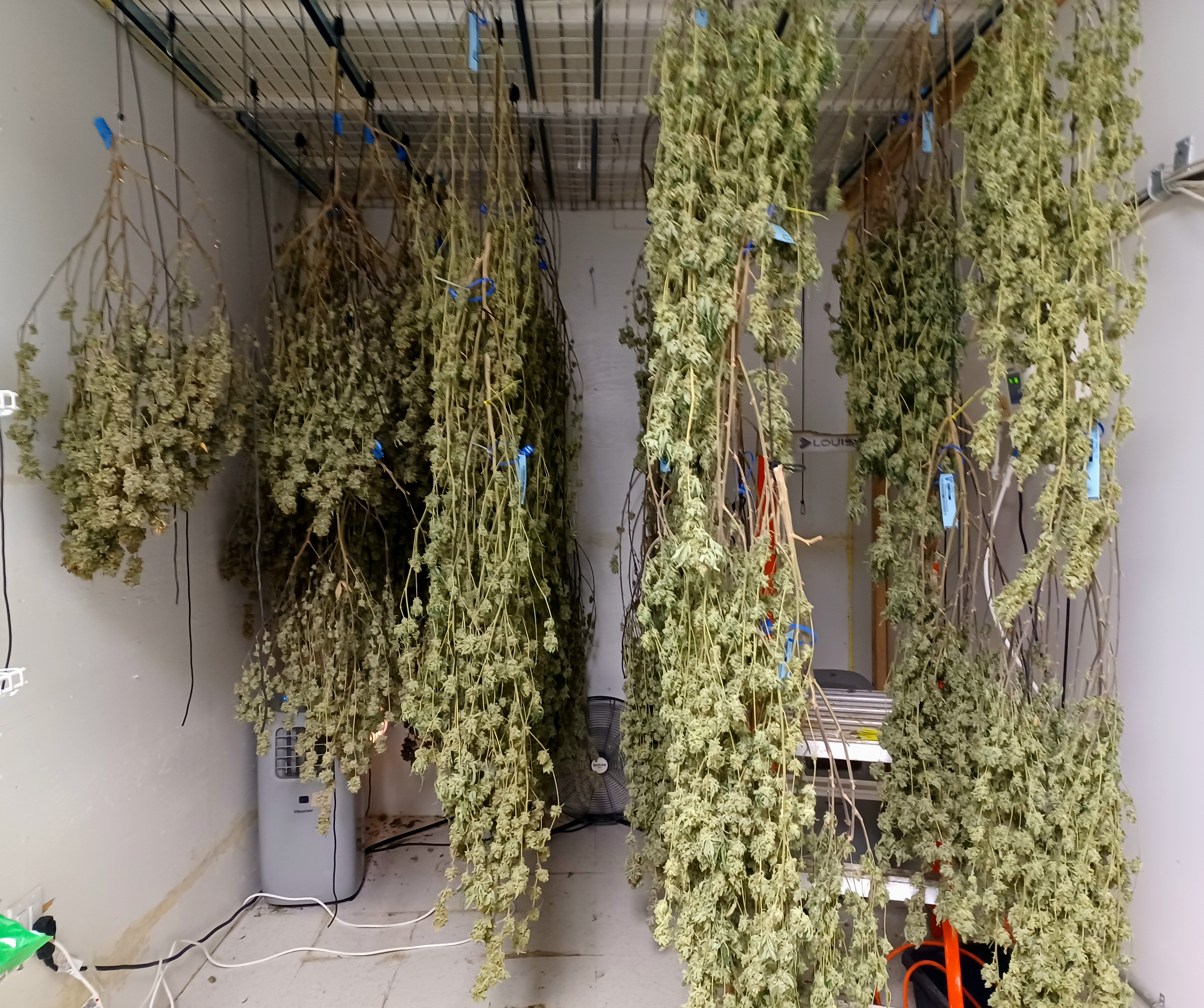
Harvested whole cannabis in a drying room at a legal grow facility in Alaska

Cannabis is fully dry for "curing" when the moisture level reaches 55–65% RH. A simple way to check this is by closing the cannabis up in an airtight glass container with a hygrometer. The container is stored for 12 hours at 22 °C (72 °F) and the hygrometer checked. 65% and above readings mean the jar needs to be opened for a few hours and then closed up, to allow more moisture to escape. The jar is again checked after 12 hours and the process repeated until a steady 55% is reached.

=== Curing ===
Once cannabis is dried to 62%, it is sealed in airtight containers to 'cure.' Some growers cure as long as six months, while others do not cure for a week or two, or not at all. As with tobacco, curing can make the cannabis more pleasant to smoke. For the same reasons as when drying, curing jars are stored in a cool, dark place.

=== Brick weed ===
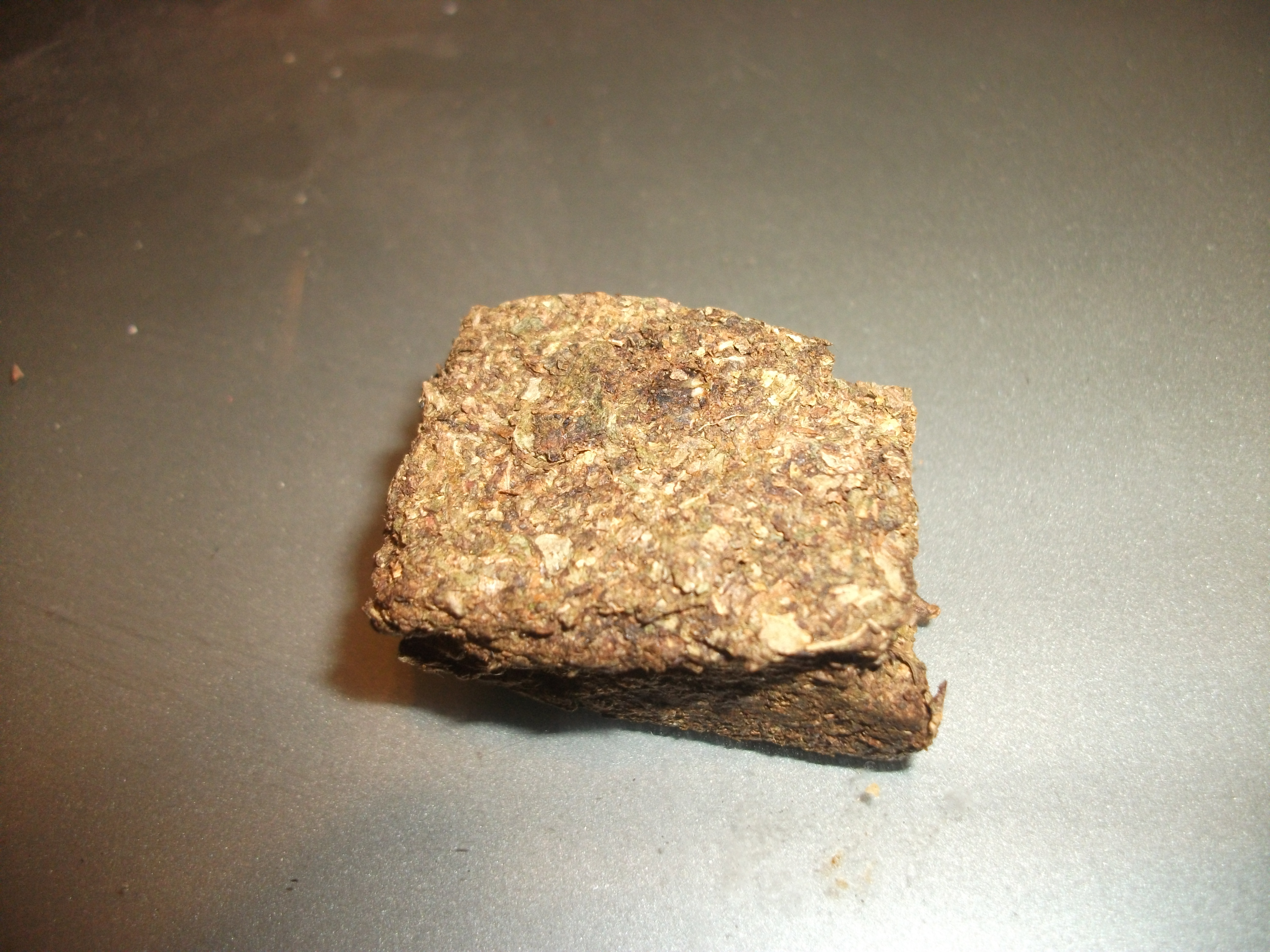
Paraguayan brick weed known as Piedra

Brick weed is a curing and packaging method of cannabis cultivation that consists in drying the bud for a short period, if at all, and pressing it with a hydraulic press, compacting the whole plant (bud, stems and seeds) into a brick, hence the name brick weed. This method is mainly used in the top cannabis producing countries like Mexico and Paraguay where it is largely exported. Brick weed has a low THC level and less potent aroma and taste.

== Pest management ==
Both indoor and outdoor growers are likely to confront issues regarding pests. Indoor growers have problems with pests, they can be brought in by hitchhiking on humans or through open exposure to the outdoors. The most common insect pest found on above ground plant parts, leaves, flowers and stems, include aphids, thrips, mites and loopers. Below ground pests that feed on the roots can also be present and include fungus gnats and root aphids. Root aphids, namely the rice root aphid can be particularly problematic due to its high reproductive rate and discrete habitat.

Several plant diseases may also be prevalent and including bud rot, powdery mildew and root rot.

If any of these pests are caught too late, eradication of many destructive species may prove futile unless all infected plants are removed from the space and sterilization methods employed.

=== Organic and inorganic pest controls ===
In any case (indoor or outdoor), experienced growers recommend caution when using chemical pesticides, for they may have toxic effects on the environment, the plants themselves and in turn cannabis consumers. As a general rule, experts mandate the deployment of pesticides clearly marked as "safe to use on food crops." However, the EPA has not registered any pesticides for use on cannabis, making the use of any pesticide on cannabis federally illegal.

Substances that have been used and considered to induce little or no harm include:

- Pyrethrins: Organic and very effective, although sometimes hard to find. Often expensive because of high production cost.
- Azadirachtin: Meets most criteria to be classified as natural insecticide. Biodegradable, non-toxic to mammals. Usually cheaper and easier to find than pyrethrins.

Substances used on cannabis but unknown if harm could occur:

- Avermectins such as Abamectin
- Atrazine
- Bifenthrin
- Copper sulfate
- Diazinon
- Etoxazole
- Imidacloprid
- Myclobutanil
- Permethrin
- Spinosad
- Spiromesifen

== Plant training ==
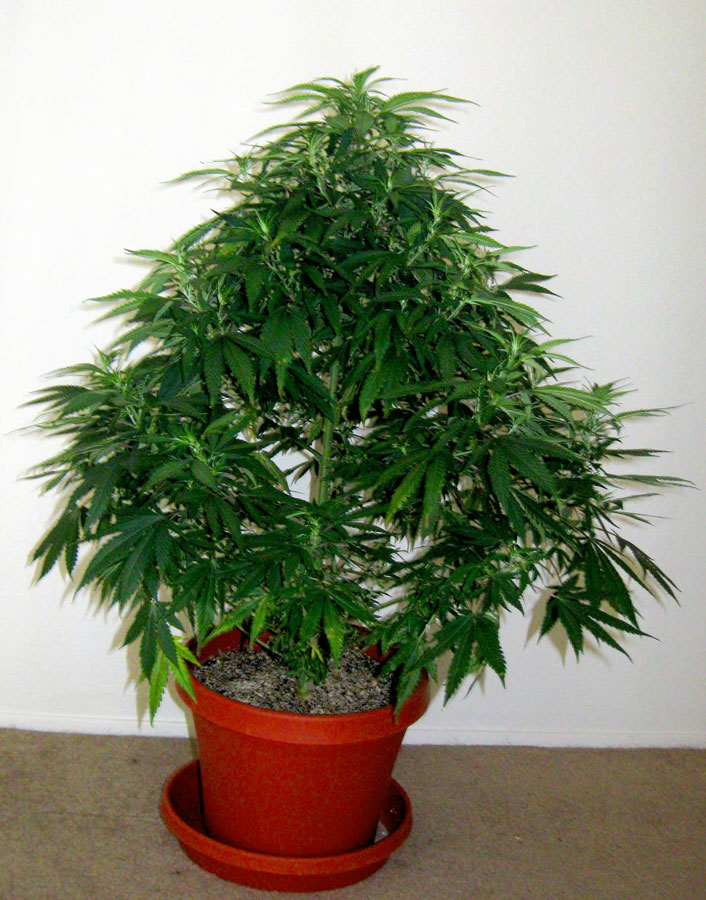
This indoor cannabis plant has not been trained and is growing in the natural Christmas tree shape that is common for untrained cannabis indica.

The modification of a plant's growth habit is called training. Indoor cultivators employ many training techniques to encourage shorter plants and denser canopy growth. For example, unless the crop is too large to be extensively pruned, cultivators remove adventitious growth shoots, often called suckers, that are near the bottom of the plant and/or receive little light and will produce poor quality buds. Some cultivators employ plant training techniques to increase yields indoors:

=== Topping ===
Topping is the removal of the top of the apical meristem (dominant central stem), called the apex or terminal bud, to transfer apical dominance (the tendency for the apex to grow more rapidly than the rest of the plant) to the shoots emanating from the two nodes immediately beneath the pruning cut. This process can be repeated on one or both of the two new meristems, when they become apically dominant, with the same results. This process can actually be repeated nigh infinitely, but over-diffusion of apical dominance produces smaller, lower quality buds, so it is usually done no more than a few times. Topping also causes more rapid growth of all of the branches below the cut while the plant heals.

=== Pinching ===
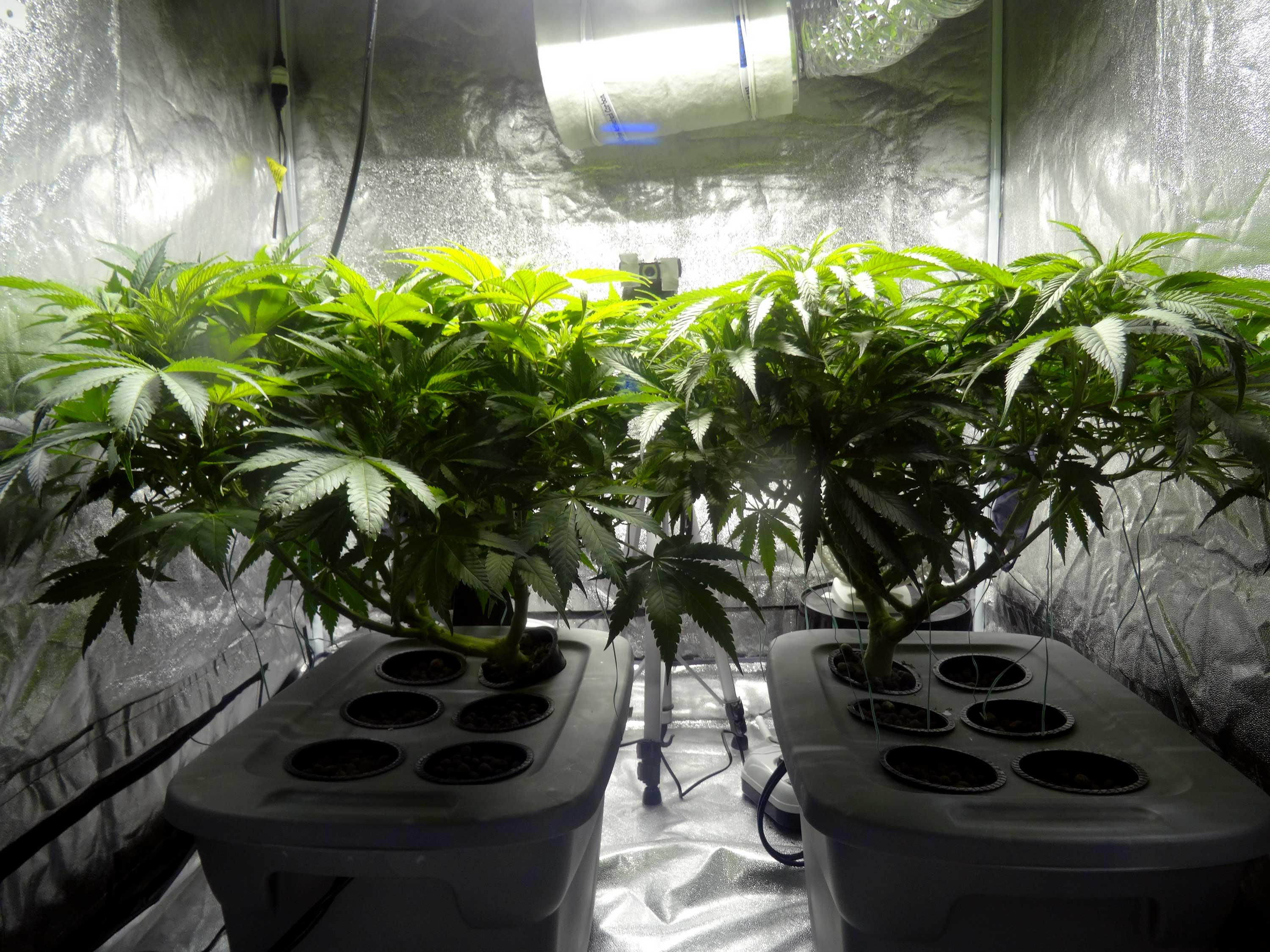
These indoor cannabis plants were trained to grow flat in order to take better advantage of the grow lights and increase yields.

Pinching (also called "FIMing") is similar to topping in that it causes lower branches to grow more rapidly, but the apical meristem maintain apical dominance, which is especially useful if the plant has already been topped. Pinching is performed by firmly pinching the apical meristem(s) so as to substantially damage vascular and structural cells but without totally breaking the stem. This causes lower limbs to grow more rapidly while the pinched tissue heals, after which time the stem resumes apical dominance.

== Hydroponics ==
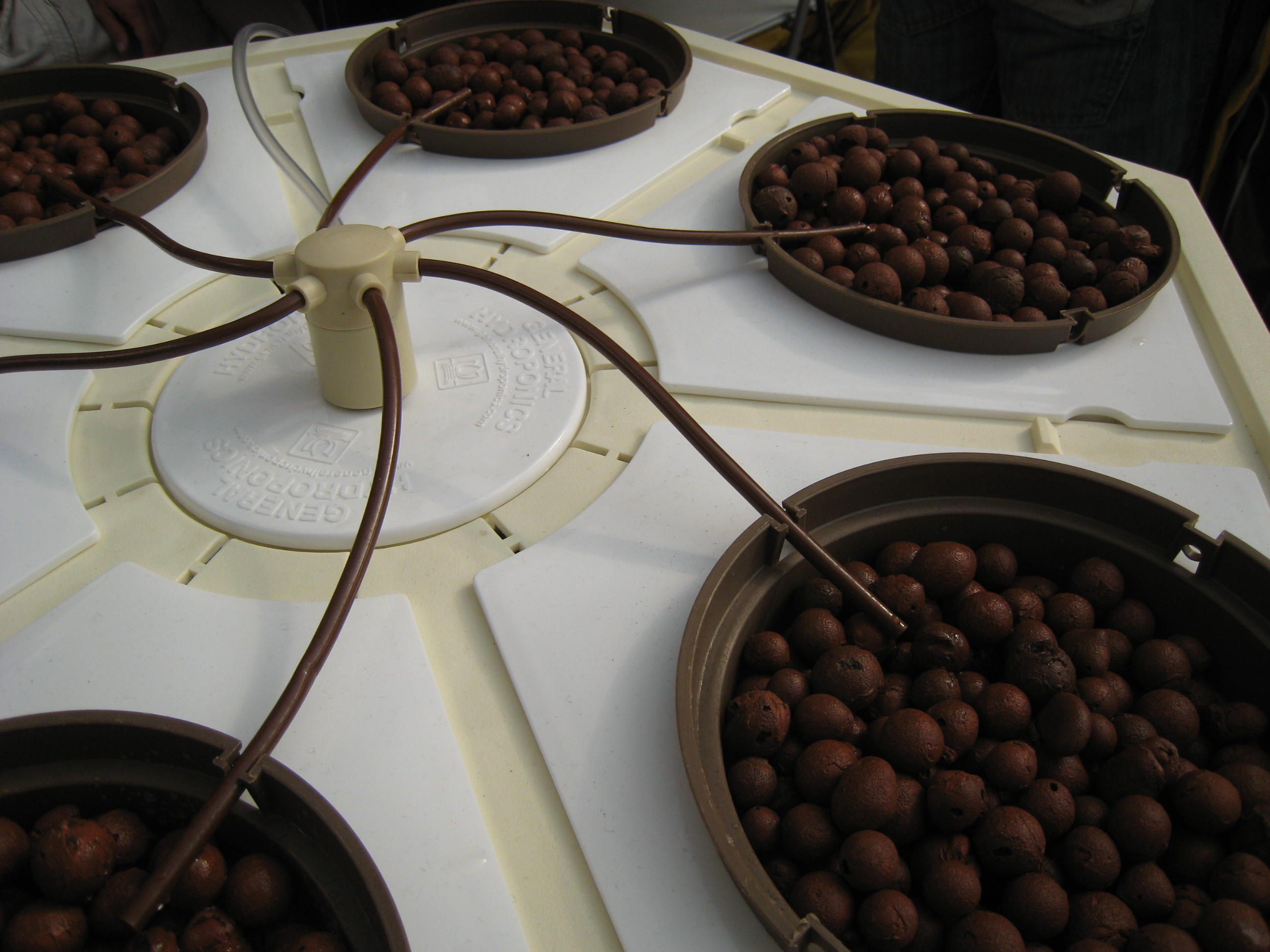
Example of a small hydroponic system for cannabis cultivation

Hydroponic cultivation generally occurs in greenhouses or indoors, although there is no practical obstacle to growing outdoors. In general, it consists of a non-soil medium exposed to a nutrient and water flow.

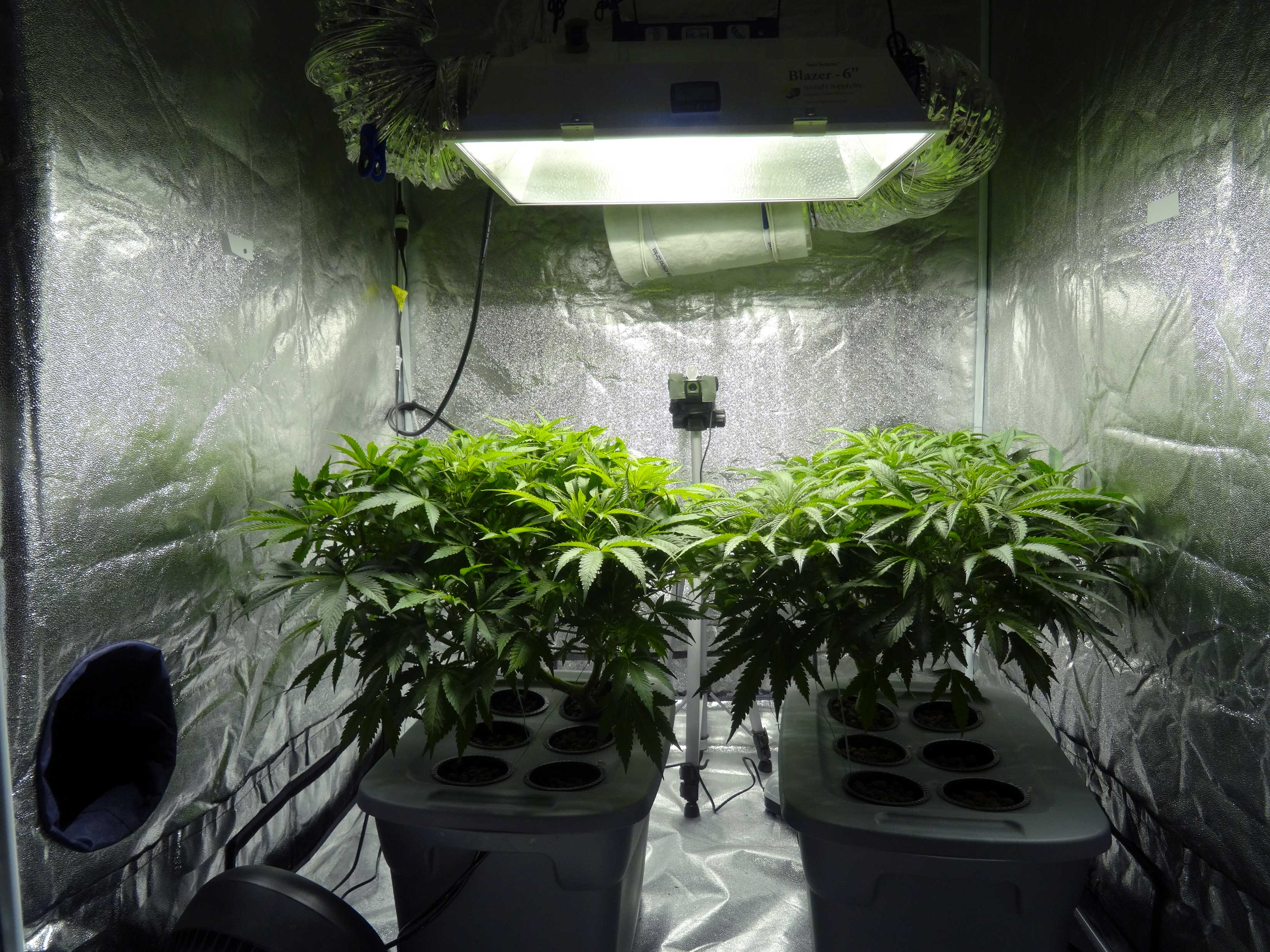
These two cannabis plants are being grown in a DWC (deep water culture) hydroponic system. They are in the vegetative stage and are being grown in a 4'x4'x7' grow tent under a 600W MH (Metal Halide) grow light.

There are many types of hydroponic systems. If the nutrient solution floods the loose growing medium and recedes for aeration, this is an ebb and flow or flood and drain system. Systems that gradually drip solution onto the medium are drip systems. Systems that intermittently spray roots floating in air are called aeroponic systems. If aerated water runs down a channel lined with a film of rooting medium, this is a nutrient film technique system. A series of tubes intermittently running high flow nutrient solution into the tops of growing containers use a top feed system. Aquaponics, another growing method that is gaining popularity, employs the use of fish water and recirculates that water from the fish holding tank to the growing bed.

Hydroponic systems greatly increase aeration of plant roots, and increase control of nutrient uptake. Hydroponic systems are decidedly more difficult to operate for the amateur or hobby grower, as over-fertilization is common, because there is no soil to act as a nutrient buffer. For this reason, many growers now use coconut fiber as a soil-less medium because of its high drainage and buffering capabilities that make it almost impossible to over-fertilize. Additionally, if a hydroponic system fails, the crop has a high probability of dying as the roots rapidly dry out (this is especially true of aeroponic systems).

There is now a new breed of hydroponic configurations such as the Omega Garden, the B-Pod and the EcoSystem Vertical Growing System that use circular designs to maximize efficiency. This consists of plants being placed or, in the case of the Omega Garden, revolving around a central light that makes maximum use of the light output.

== Genetics ==
=== Selection of mother plants ===
An important factor while cultivating photoperiod independent (non-autoflowering) cannabis is selecting the best genetics for one's crop. This is frequently done by selecting one or more known strains, or strains with preferred genetics, and then growing a number plants to find which exhibit the characteristics most desirable. These genetics should typically yield at least 1 gram (1/28 oz) per watt per month of flower.

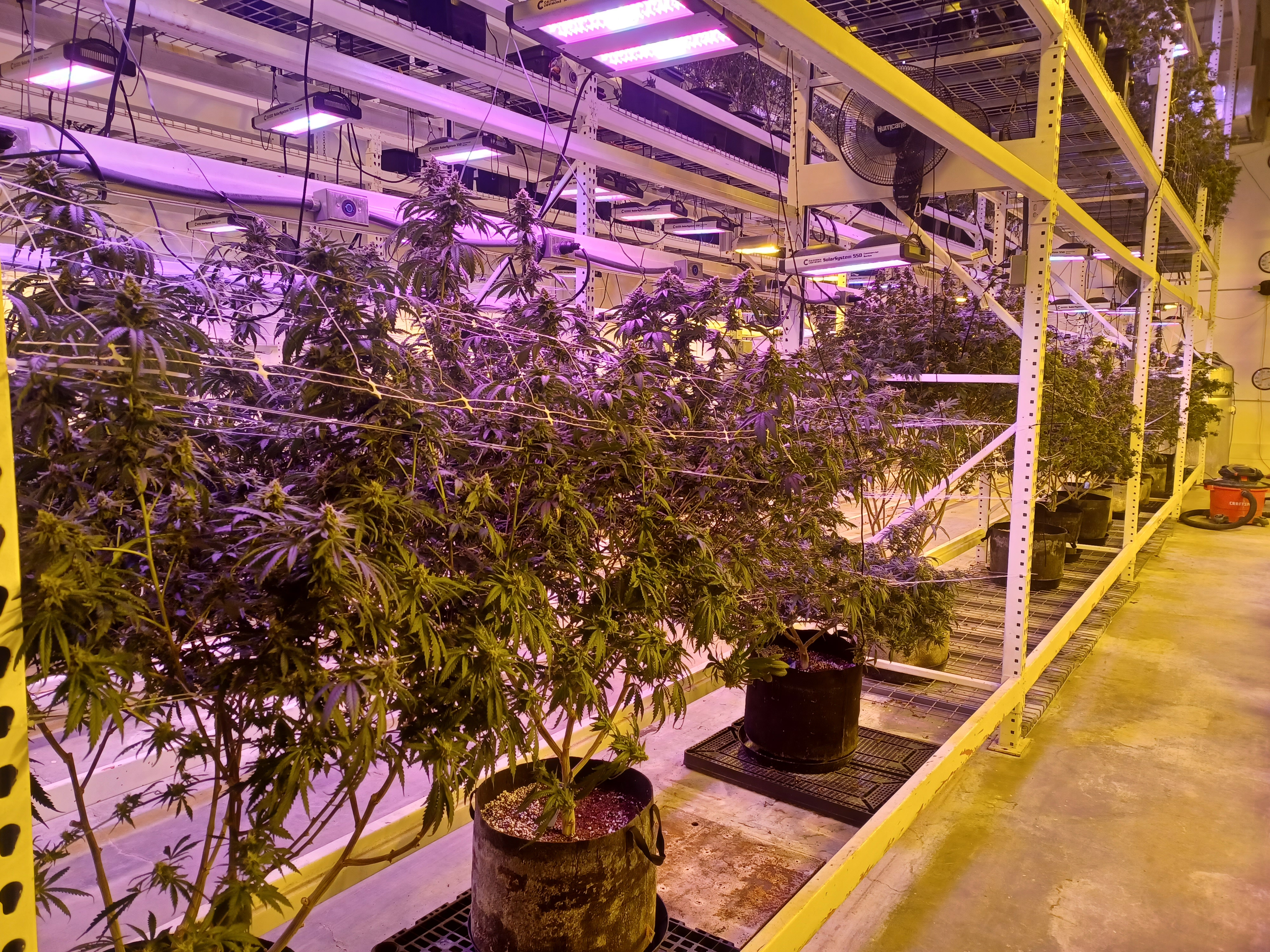
Mature mother plants that have been moved to flowering room for harvest

Plant characteristics generally selected for include:

- Overall yield
- Time to fruition
- Resistance to pests
- Geometric traits (uniformity, compactness, flower density, etc.)
- Color
- Flavor and/or aroma
- Appeal to end buyer (known as "bag appeal")
- Psychoactive qualities
- Trichome density and type (stalked or sessile)

=== Autoflowering strains ===
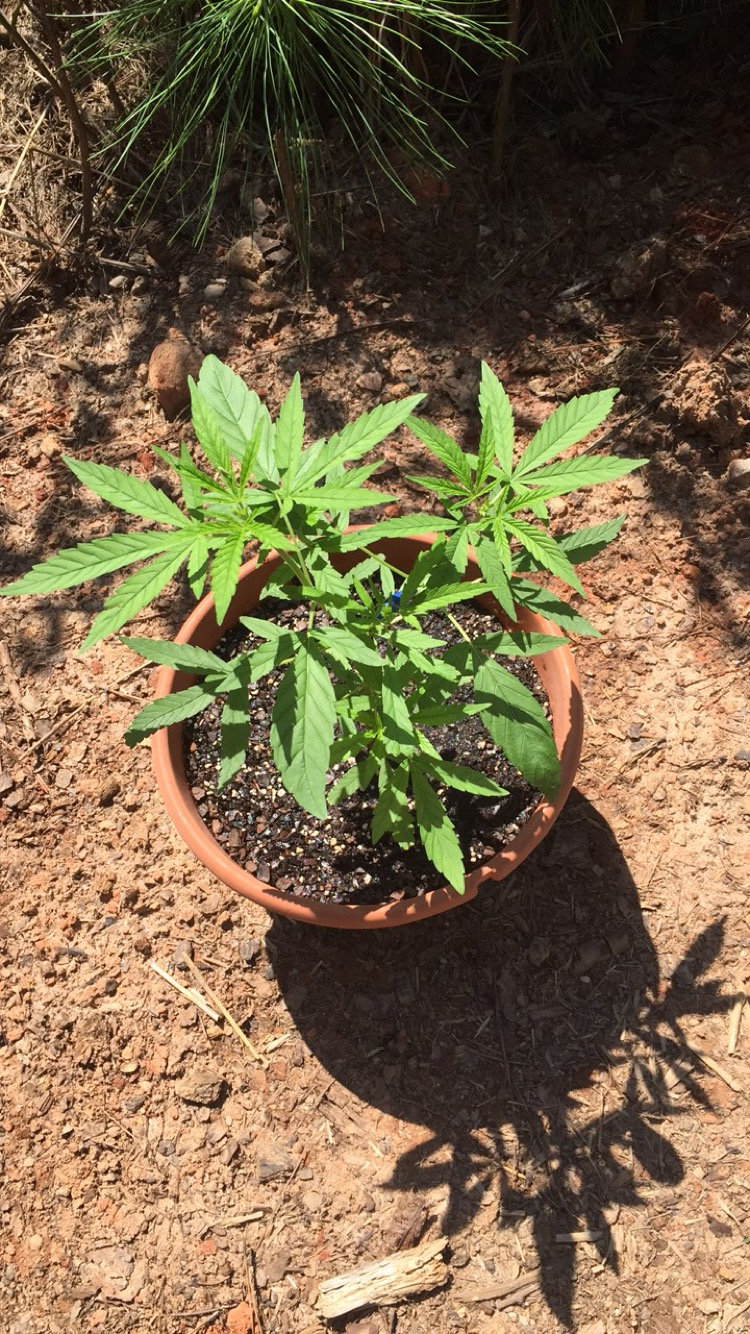
A ruderalis (auto-flowering) cannabis plant

Autoflowering cannabis strains, also known as day-neutral cannabis are a relatively new development for the home cultivator. These autoflower strains are usually crosses that contain high percentages of well known photoperiod strains and Cannabis ruderalis with its autoflowering characteristics. The plant produced from an autoflowering seed will transition from a very short vegetative period, usually 2 to 3 weeks from germination, into flowering regardless of photoperiod. The result is that no separate vegetative and flowering lighting environment is needed. Flowering is dependent on the plant's age, as opposed to time of year or ratio of light and darkness. Autoflowering varieties will bloom from seed in 12/12, 18/6, 20/4 or even 24/0 lighting, referring to light/dark time respectively.

The first autoflowering cannabis seed on the market was the Lowryder #1. This was a hybrid between a cannabis ruderalis called William's Wonder and a Northern Lights #2. The genetics of the ruderalis was still highly present which made for a very low yield and little psychoactive effect.

After many years of autoflower inbreeding, seed makers have developed autoflowering strains that can produce yields close to the regular strains and flower independent from the light cycle. The first autoflowering strains came from breeder STICH, but now, many major seed companies have strains of super autoflowers that can grow up to 2 meters (6') and produce yields up to 900 g/m^{2} (3 oz per sq. ft.) of growth.

=== Feminized seeds ===
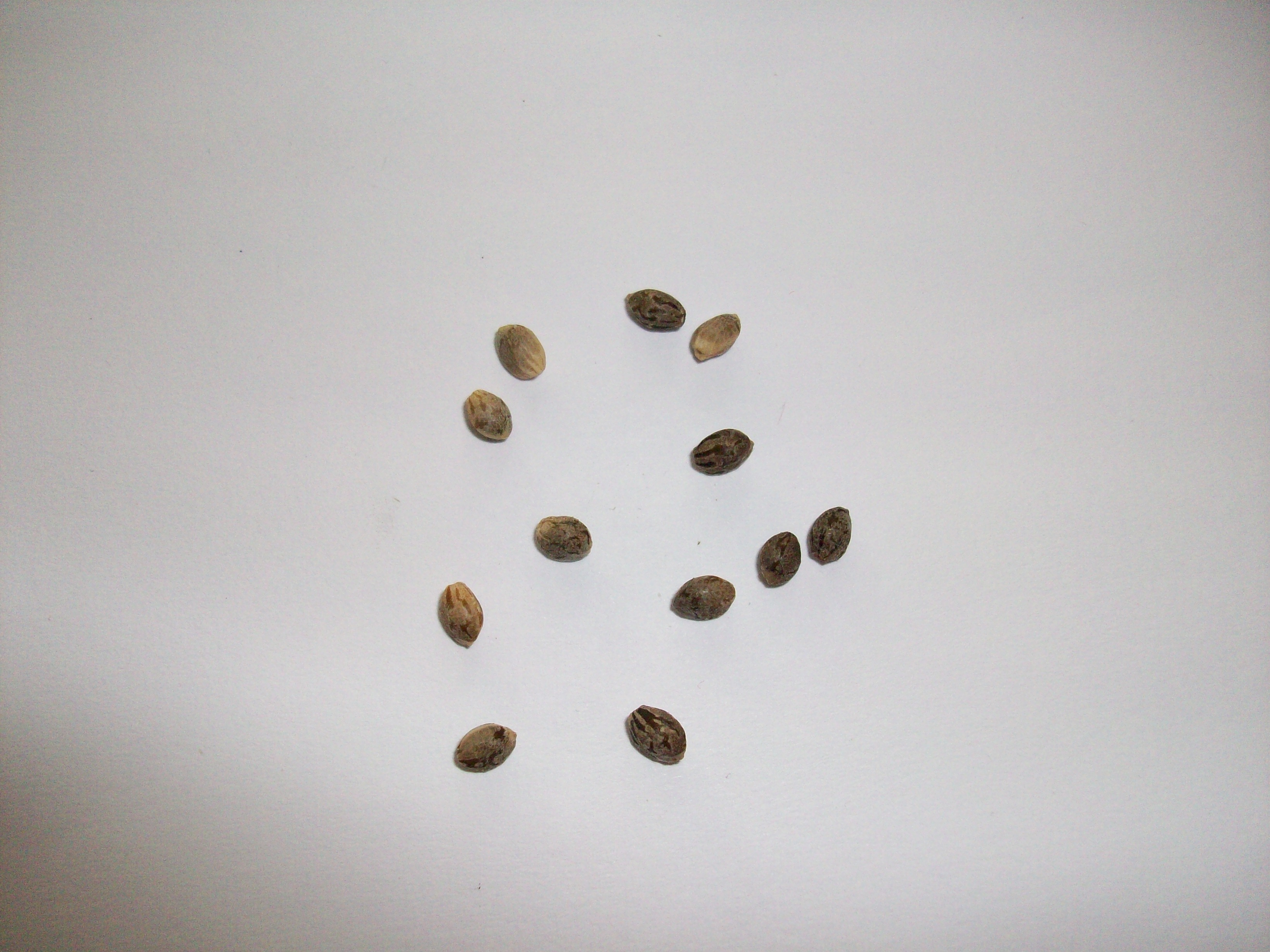
C. indica seeds

Instability of gender is a desirable trait in the wild, where reproduction is the most urgent goal. In cultivation, gender predictability is more helpful, because female plants that have not been pollinated are the most productive of the psychotropic material. It is possible to use a combination of cloning and "shocking" of plants to get them to produce feminized seeds that reliably produce female offspring. A clone retains the same sex throughout its life, so the clone of a female plant is also female.

Environmental stresses sometimes create pollen bearing male flowers on female plants—known as hermaphroditism, "herming", or "hermies".

A method used by organic growers and promulgated by the cannabis breeder Soma, is called 'Rodelization', or letting un-pollinated female plants live several weeks longer than the normal harvest time. In such plants a hermaphroditic trait self-expresses in an effort to continue the genetic line.

Some vendors of feminized seeds assert that hermaphroditic "parents" do not create reliable feminized seeds, since the offspring may retain the tendency of hermaphroditism. Others believe that this method utilizing auto-hermaphroditic traits is offset by grower observations that the tendency to auto-switch sex is no greater in plants grown from seeds made this way, than occurs naturally.

Colloidal silver (commonly abbreviated CS) suppresses ethylene production in bud sites, stimulating male characteristics. Spraying selected leaves, branches and – in cases where a large amount of seed is desired – whole plants with colloidal silver solution has become a preferred method of obtaining feminized seeds. Most plants treated with CS will turn intersex within 2 weeks of triweekly treatment, producing viable pollen within 4. Gibberellic acid has also been used for the same purpose, but it is harder to acquire than colloidal silver and can be difficult to dissolve into solution. One method of obtaining colloidal silver utilizes a small direct current power supply and two pieces of solid silver jeweler's wire, or silver coin.

Some cultivators claim that the genes responsible for hermaphroditism are present and may be expressed under stress from any of the above methods and that once expressed, this characteristic passes to seeds regardless of what activated it. This view, in large part, is incorrect, as a random half of the genes present in each of the parental plants passes to the next generation, regardless of whether the genes that contribute to hermaphroditism were induced by stressors or not. This widely accepted Mendelian model of inheritance (Mendelian inheritance) does allow for genetic mutations that have occurred in the germline of an organism to be passed on to any offspring, but this process applies to all DNA sequences, not just those contributing to hermaphroditism. The inheritance of acquired characteristics (lamarckism) that are not directly coded in the DNA sequence (epigenetics) has recently received much attention in the area of genetic research and could possibly explain any anecdotal evidence for increased hermaphroditism in the offspring of plants induced to a hermaphroditic state. However, a more likely explanation is that by propagating plants easily induced to hermaphroditism by environmental stressors, the frequency of genetic elements contributing to this trait is increased by artificial selection following traditional genetic models of inheritance. Some theories suggest it is possible to selectively breed hermaphroditic cannabis to express the female flowering before the male flowering occurs, though this kind of selective breeding is beyond the capabilities of most cultivators.

=== Hybrid vigor ===
When crossing two strains of cannabis (or two of any plant), the resultant hybrid may possess what is called hybrid vigor. In general, this produces a plant that is healthier, stronger, or quicker growing than its predecessors. Sometimes, in the case of a plant that has been brought back from fruiting (fruition, as mentioned above), it may be beneficial to cross it back with another (close) relative, in the hopes that it becomes invigorated.

Caution should be exercised, as one does not always attain a beneficial cross with hybridizing.

== Vegetative propagation (cloning) ==
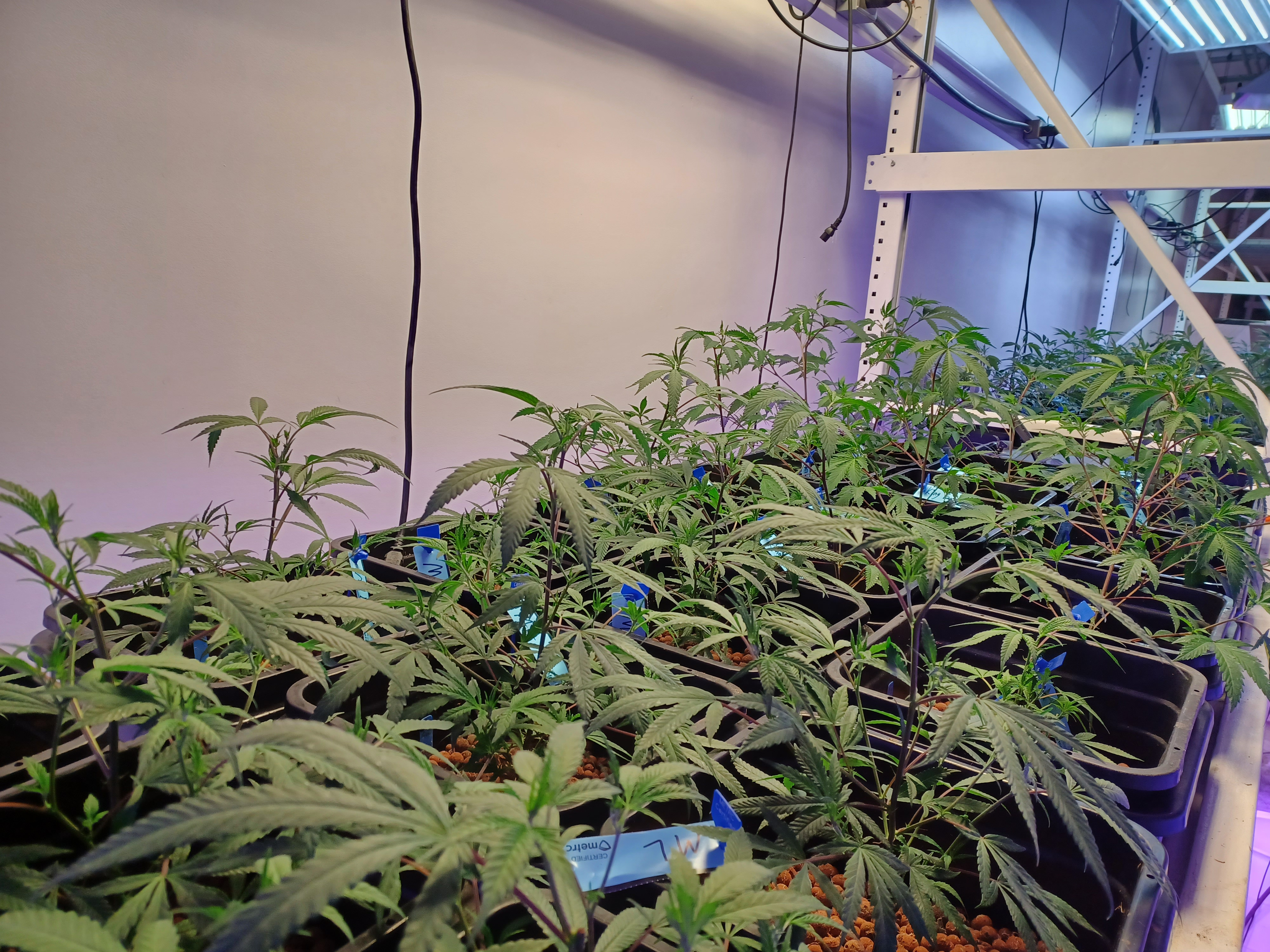
Young cloned plants in a vegitating room with a hydroponic system

Like most plants, cannabis has the potential for vegetative propagation, with the most common and simple method being cutting. Cutting is characterized as a cloning method, since the derived plants have identical DNA to the "mother plants".

Under appropriate environmental conditions, a cut part of the cannabis plant, typically from the main stem or a lateral branch, has the ability to produce roots and develop into a whole new plant (the clone), genetically identical to the mother. In cannabis, the production of roots may take anywhere from 5 to 21 days.

The oldest method of cannabis propagation is water cloning. Used for nearly as long as agriculture has been a part of human development, one simply sticks the cut end of clone (cutting) into a small body of water like a glass or bowl and waits. Water cloning can take longer to show roots, but is a truly natural way to propagate any plant that is able.

Marijuana growers often root clones in peat pellets (compressed peat moss) or in rock wool. Another technique that has become popular for rooting clones is aeroponic cloning.

The main steps of hormonal cannabis cutting are as follows:

1. Part of the main stem or lateral branch up to 20 cm (8") long is dissected in a non-vertical manner. The bottom 2/3 of leaves are removed.
2. The cut end is brought to contact with rooting hormone, according to instructions, to promote root growth and inhibit fungal infection.
3. The cutting is placed in an appropriate initial medium such as common soil, compost, perlite, vermiculite, peat moss, sand, rock wool, oasis foam or a combination of those. The initial medium is kept moist and high humidity is maintained in the surrounding air. Elevated humidity levels slow the transpiration rate (water loss from leaves) and prevent the cutting from drying out. Mold is a common hazard due to the higher humidity and stressed cutting. During this phase, the temperature is kept relatively low (25 °C (77 °F)) and direct light is avoided so that the cutting does not dry out. The production from the slower photosynthesis is put into root production.
4. After initial root development is evident (usually within three weeks) the cutting is ready to be transplanted into its final grow medium. The high humidity environment is no longer necessary.
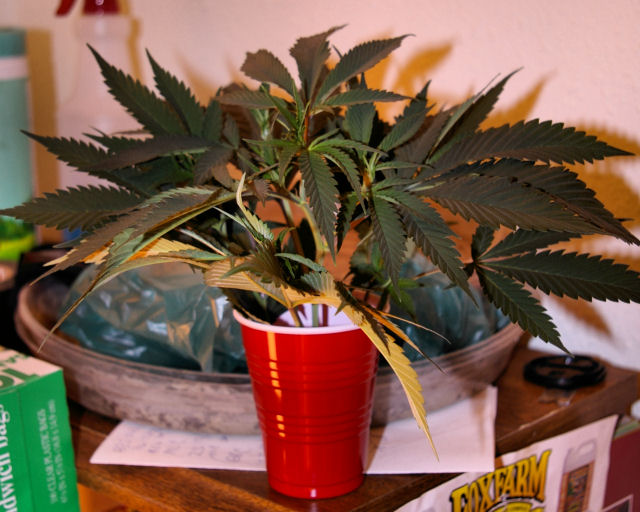
"Blueberry" cannabis cuttings waiting to be trimmed and re-cut

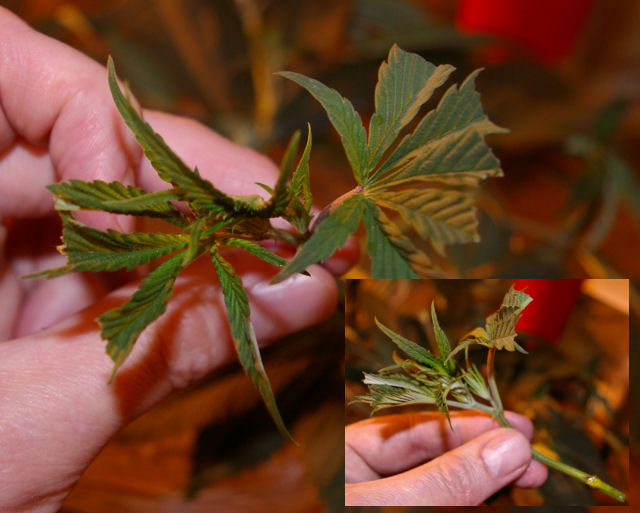
Trimmed with stem re-cut at 45-degree angle below a node

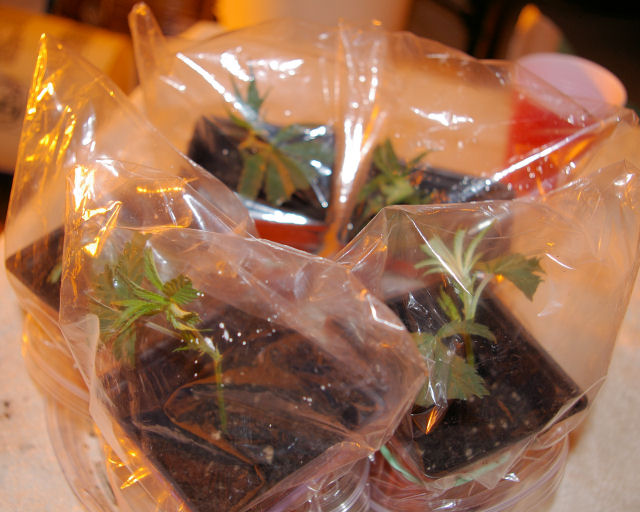
New clones under improvised humidity domes

== Waste products ==
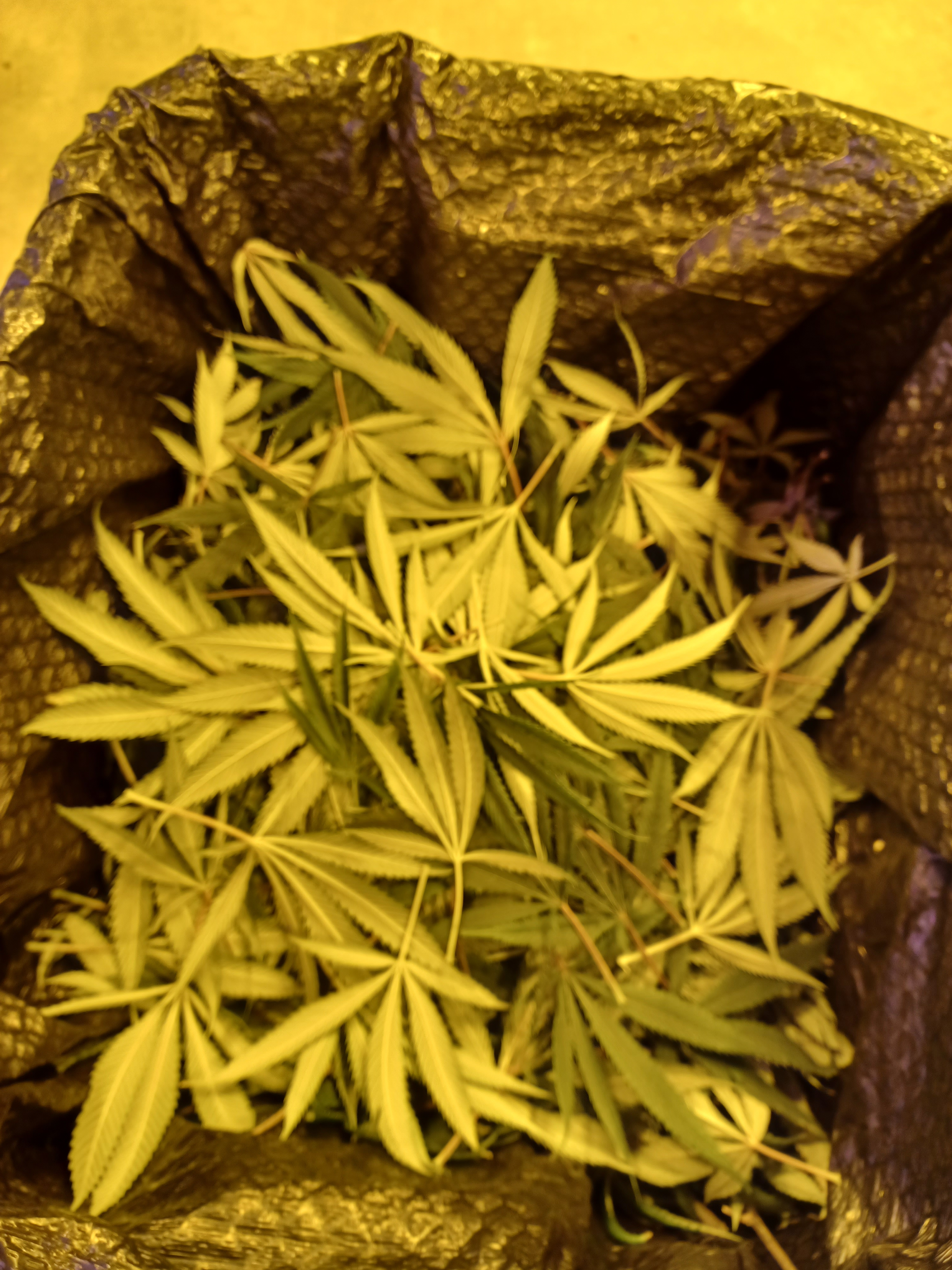
Fan leaves in a trash receptacle

Prior to the establishment of the first legal cannabis market in Colorado, United States, growers of the plant in the American State of Washington experimented with the use of cannabis waste for pig food. In early 2013, potent cannabis waste products were mixed into the feed of four pigs during the last four months of their lives, resulting in a weight increase of 20 pounds (9.1 kg) to 30 pounds (14 kg) that was registered before the pigs were sent to slaughter in March 2013. Washington State's draft regulations prescribe that cannabis waste must be "rendered unusable prior to leaving a licensed producer or processor's facility," and adds that mixing it with food waste is acceptable. The European Food Safety Authority reported in 2011 that "no studies concerning tolerance or effects of graded levels of THC in food-producing animals have been found in literature." The agency also noted that "no data are available concerning the likely transfer of THC ... to animal tissues and eggs following repeated administration."

== Environmental impact ==
Environmental impact of cannabis cultivation includes all the environmental issues which occur as a result of cannabis cultivation.

Cannabis agriculture is a massive industry in its scope and extent, yet its environmental impact is much less researched than comparable agricultural products produced at this scale. Many countries around the world are liberalizing their cannabis policy which will make the industry grow, and as the industry grows, so does the urgency to respond to special considerations in environmental impact for this industry.

== See also ==
- Cannabis strains
- Autoflowering cannabis
- Grow house
- Hemp
- Hydroponics
- Legality of cannabis
- Medical cannabis
- Organic farming
- Vertical farming
