= Environmental impact of cannabis cultivation =

Cannabis affecting environment

Environmental impact of cannabis cultivation includes all the environmental issues which occur as a result of cannabis cultivation.

Cannabis agriculture is a massive industry in its scope and extent, yet its environmental impact is much less researched than comparable agricultural products produced at this scale. Many countries around the world are liberalizing their cannabis policy which will make the industry grow, and as the industry grows, so does the urgency to respond to special considerations in environmental impact for this industry.

== History ==
The history of farming cannabis production as an issue of drug use has suppressed discussion about cannabis production as a massive agricultural sector. In places where cannabis is legal to produce, discussing environmental impact is still challenging because so many other issues related to cannabis distract from the conversation.

Indoor cultivation of cannabis is common and research intensive. A 2012 study estimated that 1% of energy production in the United States is for cannabis production, giving cannabis a substantial carbon footprint. That same study could not identify energy analysts or policymakers who had addressed the issue. The study noted that indoor cultivation is mostly a consequence of illegality, and if cannabis were legal, then outdoor cultivation would greatly lower this use of electricity.

A United Nations report compared the environmental impact of cannabis against other drugs and found that cannabis pollutes less with dangerous chemicals. Black market cannabis production does tend to disrupt fragile and remote environments due to the farmers hiding the crop rather than using conventional farmland.

Cannabis plants can produce volatile organic compound in great enough amounts to increase the criteria air pollutants in indoor and outdoor environments. This could create an occupational health hazard in areas with large numbers of plants.

Cannabis in California is a frequent focus of study. One study found that cannabis production diverts water from watersheds. Encroachment in public land has been a frequent occurrence. Various legal pressures in California has led some production to be indoors. Getting quality data in California has been a challenge.

Cannabis in comparison to other crops could be an environmental benefit.

There is a trend towards an increase in the number of cultivators who are using sustainable methods for growing cannabis. To improve the soil, they mainly use: special AACT inoculations, growing companion crops, and even grazing goats, which loosen and aerate the soil with their hooves, and their droppings are used as a natural fertilizer.

== Energy Usage ==
Most regulated cannabis in the United States is grown indoors. Growing market-quality cannabis indoors requires intensive production conditions supported by a continuous input of electricity. Indoor cannabis cultivation requires climate management to produce optimal growing conditions, including specialized lighting, water management, and HVAC systems. These indoor environmental controls prevent crop loss and optimize yield, but often demand large amounts of electricity. Cannabis cultivation consumed approximately 0.11 percent of all electricity used in the US in 2017, while regulated cultivators used 0.03 percent. However, actual electricity consumption by cannabis cultivators may be much higher— up to and potentially exceeding 1 percent of total US electricity consumption.

Some cannabis cultivators manage their electricity consumption by integrating power generation sources like solar panels. They may also utilize LED lighting and other efficiency measures to lower energy usage. However, energy investments are expensive and significant capital is required up front to integrate.
