= Marihuana prensada =

Derivative of cannabis in Paraguay

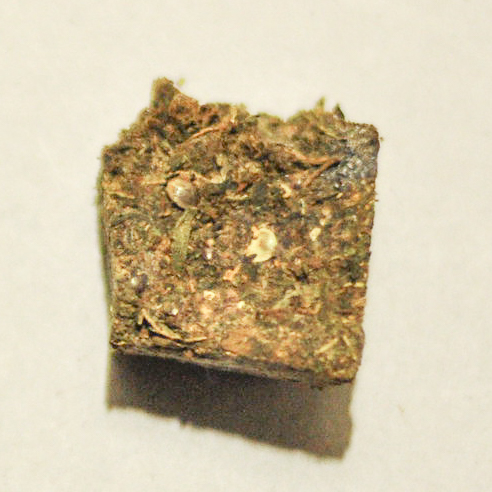

Marihuana prensada or cannabis prensado (pressed cannabis or marijuana), also known as ladrillo (brick weed) or, colloquially, paragua or paraguayo is a compressed cannabis cut into blocks that facilitate transport.

The largest producer of pressed marijuana is Paraguay, and from there it is exported to Chile, Bolivia, Brazil, Peru, Colombia, Venezuela, and the United States.

Other names for this product are soko, doko, paraplex macoña, pasto, faso, chamico, enramao, presso, paragua or Paraguayan brick.

== Production ==
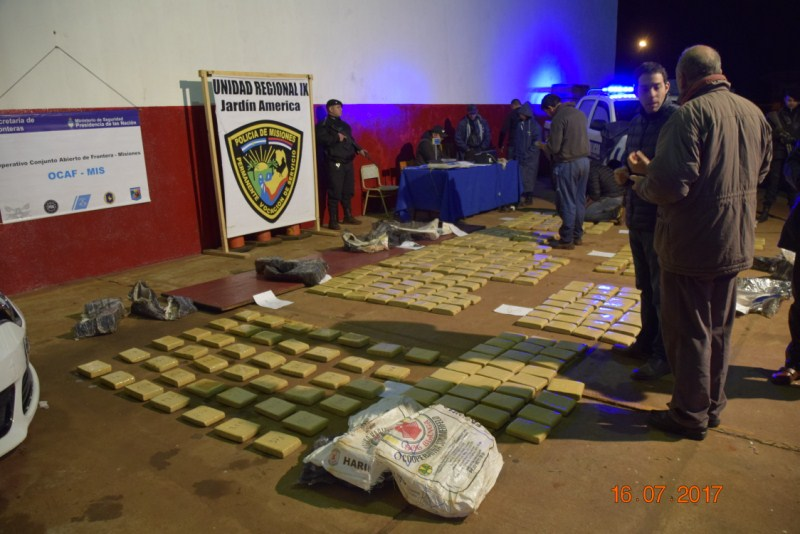
Seizure of 300 kg (700 lb) of pressed marijuana by the Police of Misiones (Argentina), in Colonia Oasis, 2017

In Paraguay, cannabis cultivation occurs mainly in the departments of Alto Paraná, Amambay, Caaguazú, Caazapá, Canindeyú, Concepción, Itapúa and San Pedro. To make pressed bricks, marijuana is harvested, allowed to dry, and compressed in a hydraulic press.

=== Adulterated brick weed ===
Sometimes brick weed is adulterated with other binding substances including industrial glues such as Neoprene, tar, ammonia, bitumen, petroleum-derived hydrocarbons, dog food or even human or animal excrement. to make it cheaper, thus being of poorer quality. Its use is strongly discouraged due to the contamination and toxicity of adulterants.

=== Low quality cannabis ===
People involved in the production of pressed marijuana often have little or no knowledge about cannabis cultivation, so, during the process, large amounts of trichomes (the most psychoactive part) are wasted, while leaves, stems and seeds are included, which should be avoided. Little care is taken when the branches are left in the sun to dry them; As they are stacked on top of each other, moisture is retained and certain parts begin to rot, parts that will be negligently incorporated into the final product. In some cases, marihuana prensada contains no marijuana, but grass.

Despite its poor quality, its use is widely spread among the lower classes throughout South America.

== Use ==
Although cannabis can be found in foods, beverages, cosmetics, etc., marihuana prensada is exclusively smoked in the form of a cigarette (joint).

== Health risks ==
Marihuana prensada is the most harmful derivative of marijuana, being more toxic than natural marijuana. It is difficult to determine the effects on the human body because its ingredients vary greatly depending on who makes it. In addition, at customs crossings at international borders, it is remixed with other products to mask the smell of cannabis.

The combustion of petroleum and mineral tar increases the risk of cancer in the respiratory tract. Neoprene, a glue considered a drug, contributes to further addiction to the product, especially if it contains toluene. In addition to serious neurodegenerative damage, it can also damage vital organs such as the liver, heart or brain, affecting cognitive function.
