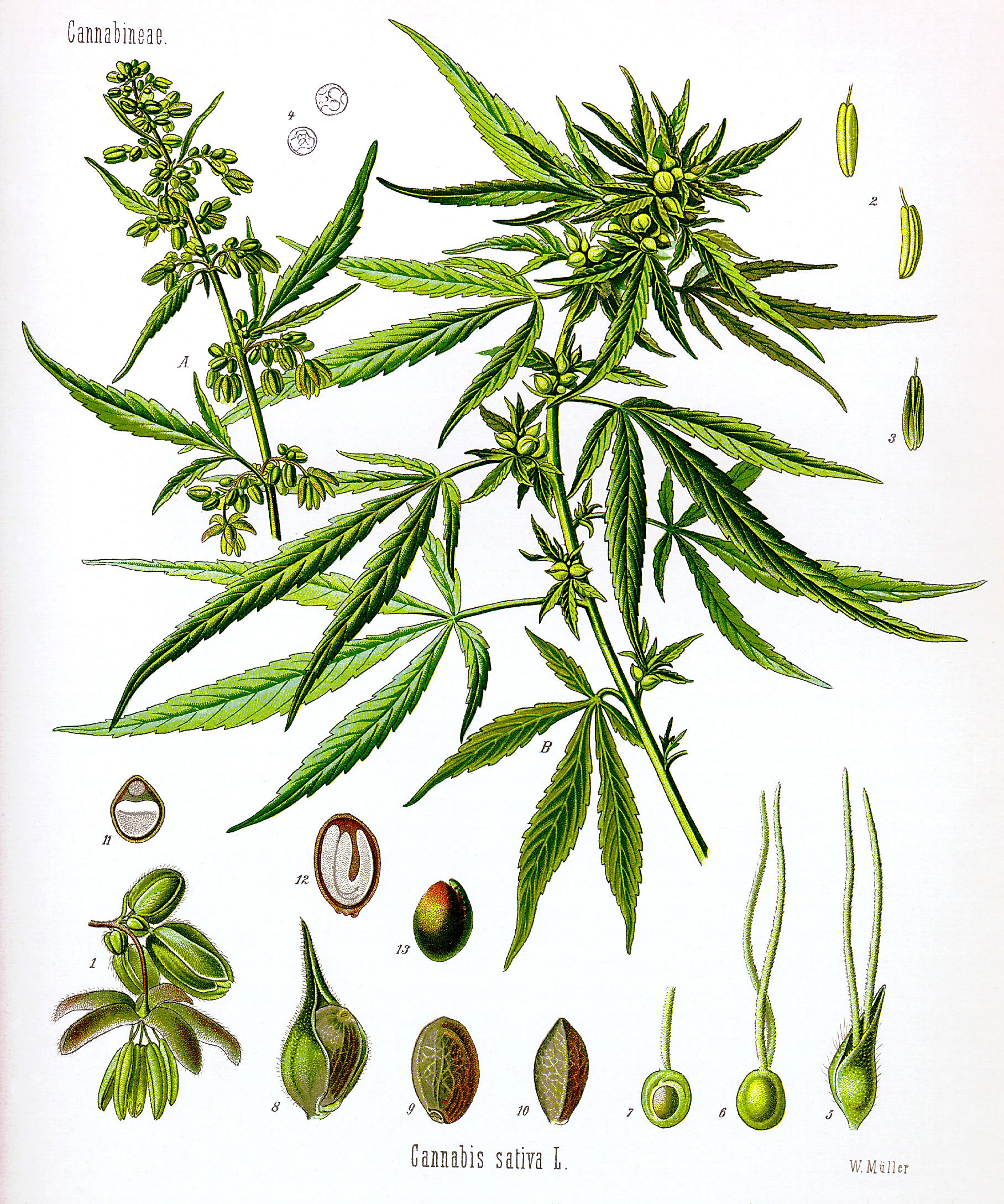
- Common hemp

Scientific classification
- Kingdom: Plantae
- Clade: Tracheophytes
- Clade: Angiosperms
- Clade: Eudicots
- Clade: Rosids
- Order: Rosales
- Family: Cannabaceae
- Genus: Cannabis; L.

Species
- Cannabis sativa L.; Cannabis indica Lam.; Cannabis ruderalis Janisch

= Cannabis =

Cannabis Temporal range: Early Miocene – Present 19.6–0 Ma

Genus of flowering plants

Cannabis (/ˈkænəbɪs/) is a genus of flowering plants in the family Cannabaceae that is widely accepted as being indigenous to and originating from the continent of Asia. The number of species is disputed, with as many as three species being recognized: Cannabis sativa, C. indica, and C. ruderalis. Alternatively, C. ruderalis may be included within C. sativa, or all three may be treated as subspecies of C. sativa, or C. sativa may be accepted as a single undivided species.

The plant is also known as hemp, although this term is usually used to refer only to varieties cultivated for non-drug use. Hemp has long been used for fibre, seeds and their oils, leaves for use as vegetables, and juice. Industrial hemp textile products are made from cannabis plants selected to produce an abundance of fibre.

Cannabis also has a long history of being used for medicinal purposes, and as a recreational drug known by several slang terms, such as marijuana, pot or weed. Various cannabis strains have been bred, often selectively to produce high or low levels of tetrahydrocannabinol (THC), a cannabinoid and the plant's principal psychoactive constituent. Compounds such as hashish and hash oil are extracted from the plant. More recently, there has been interest in other cannabinoids like cannabidiol (CBD), cannabigerol (CBG), and cannabinol (CBN).

== Etymology ==
Cannabis is a Scythian word. The ancient Greeks learned of the use of cannabis by observing Scythian funerals, during which cannabis was consumed.

== Description ==
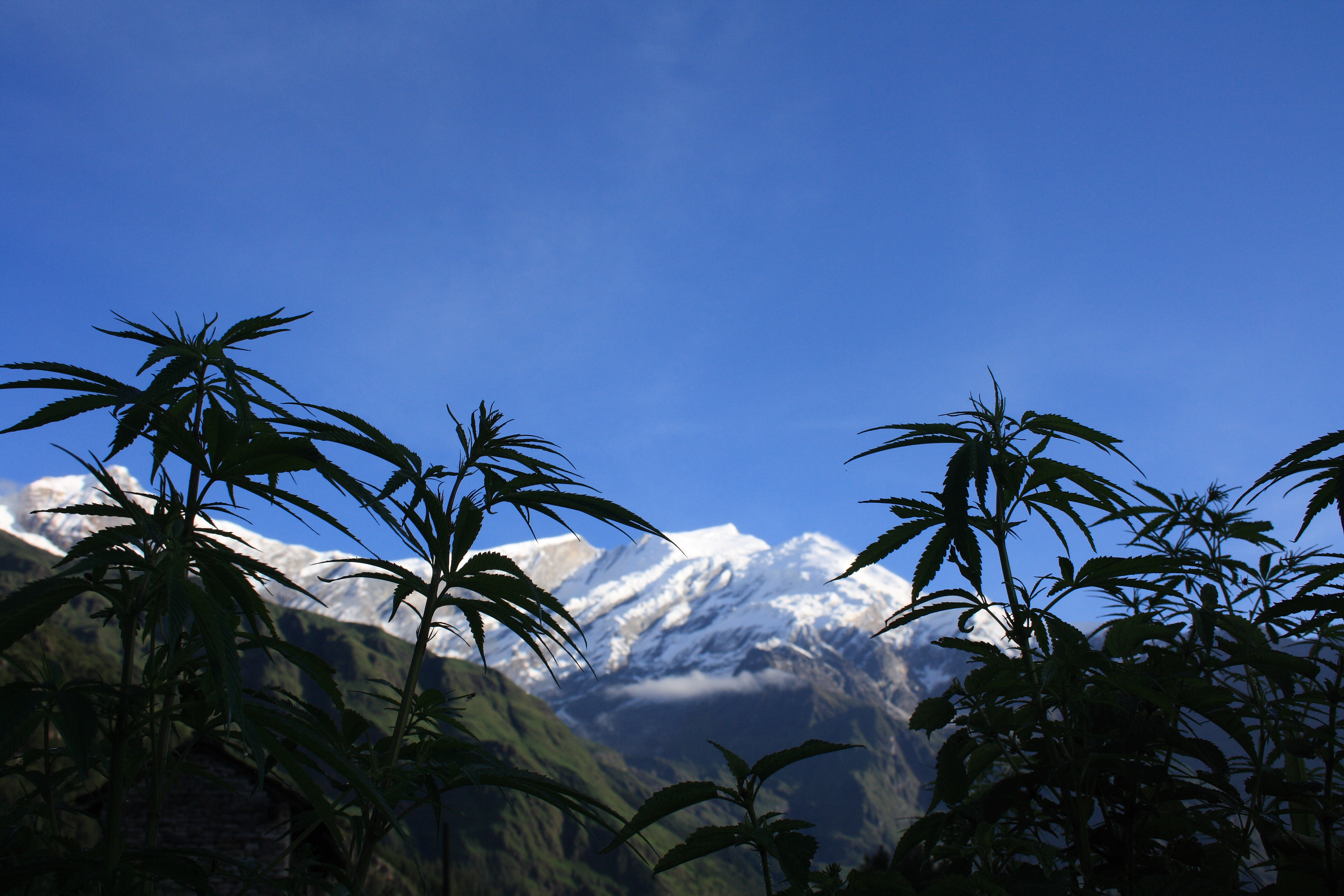
Cannabis growing as weeds at the foot of Dhaulagiri, Nepal

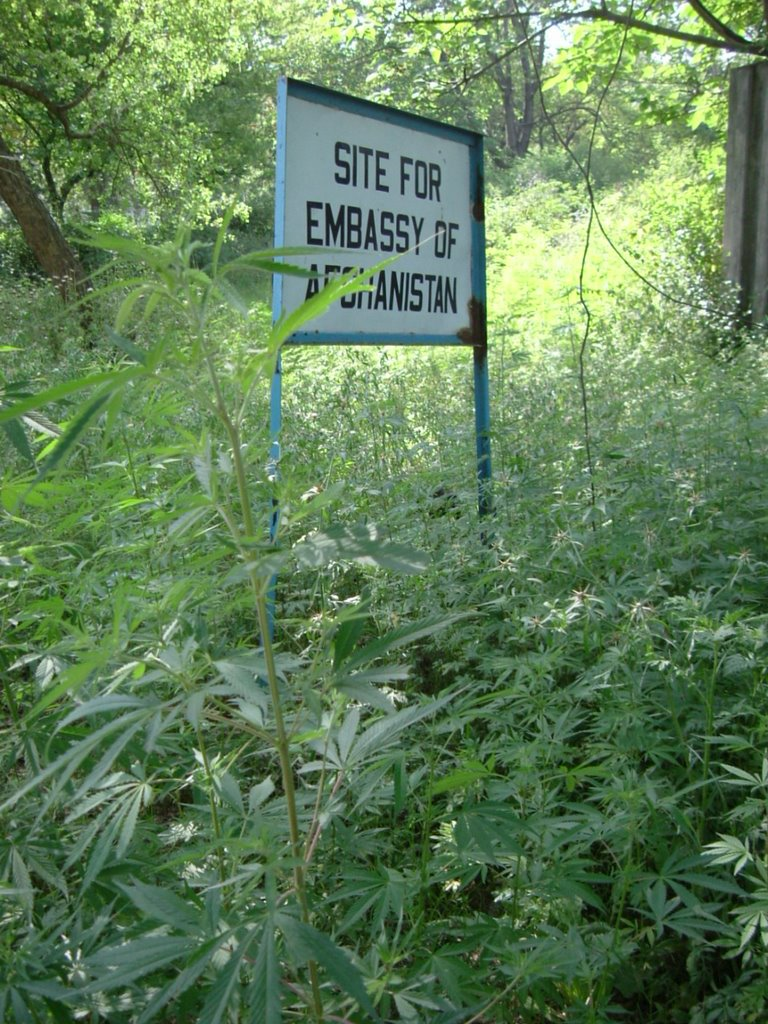
A thicket of wild cannabis in Islamabad, Pakistan

Cannabis is an annual, dioecious, flowering herb. The leaves are palmately compound or digitate, with serrate leaflets. The first pair of leaves usually have a single leaflet, the number gradually increasing up to a maximum of about thirteen leaflets per leaf (usually seven or nine), depending on variety and growing conditions. At the top of a flowering plant, this number again diminishes to a single leaflet per leaf. The lower leaf pairs usually occur in an opposite leaf arrangement and the upper leaf pairs in an alternate arrangement on the main stem of a mature plant.

The leaves have a peculiar and diagnostic venation pattern (which varies slightly among varieties) that allows for easy identification of Cannabis leaves from unrelated species with similar leaves. As is common in serrated leaves, each serration has a central vein extending to its tip, but in Cannabis this originates from lower down the central vein of the leaflet, typically opposite to the position of the second notch down. This means that on its way from the midrib of the leaflet to the point of the serration, the vein serving the tip of the serration passes close by the intervening notch. Sometimes the vein will pass tangentially to the notch, but often will pass by at a small distance; when the latter happens a spur vein (or occasionally two) branches off and joins the leaf margin at the deepest point of the notch. Tiny samples of Cannabis also can be identified with precision by microscopic examination of leaf cells and similar features, requiring special equipment and expertise.

=== Reproduction ===
All known strains of Cannabis are wind-pollinated and the fruit is an achene. Most strains of Cannabis are short day plants, with the possible exception of C. sativa subsp. sativa var. spontanea (= C. ruderalis), which is commonly described as "auto-flowering" and may be day-neutral.

Cannabis is predominantly dioecious, having imperfect flowers, with staminate "male" and pistillate "female" flowers occurring on separate plants. "At a very early period the Chinese recognized the Cannabis plant as dioecious", and the (c. 3rd century BCE) Erya dictionary defined xi 枲 "male Cannabis" and fu 莩 (or ju 苴) "female Cannabis". Male flowers are normally borne on loose panicles, and female flowers are borne on racemes.

Many monoecious varieties have also been described, in which individual plants bear both male and female flowers. (Although monoecious plants are often referred to as "hermaphrodites", true hermaphrodites – which are less common in Cannabis – bear staminate and pistillate structures together on individual flowers, whereas monoecious plants bear male and female flowers at different locations on the same plant.) Subdioecy (the occurrence of monoecious individuals and dioecious individuals within the same population) is widespread. Many populations have been described as sexually labile.

As a result of intensive selection in cultivation, Cannabis exhibits many sexual phenotypes that can be described in terms of the ratio of female to male flowers occurring in the individual, or typical in the cultivar. Dioecious varieties are preferred for drug production, where the fruits (produced by female flowers) are used. Dioecious varieties are also preferred for textile fiber production, whereas monoecious varieties are preferred for pulp and paper production. It has been suggested that the presence of monoecy can be used to differentiate licit crops of monoecious hemp from illicit drug crops, but sativa strains often produce monoecious individuals, which is possibly as a result of inbreeding.

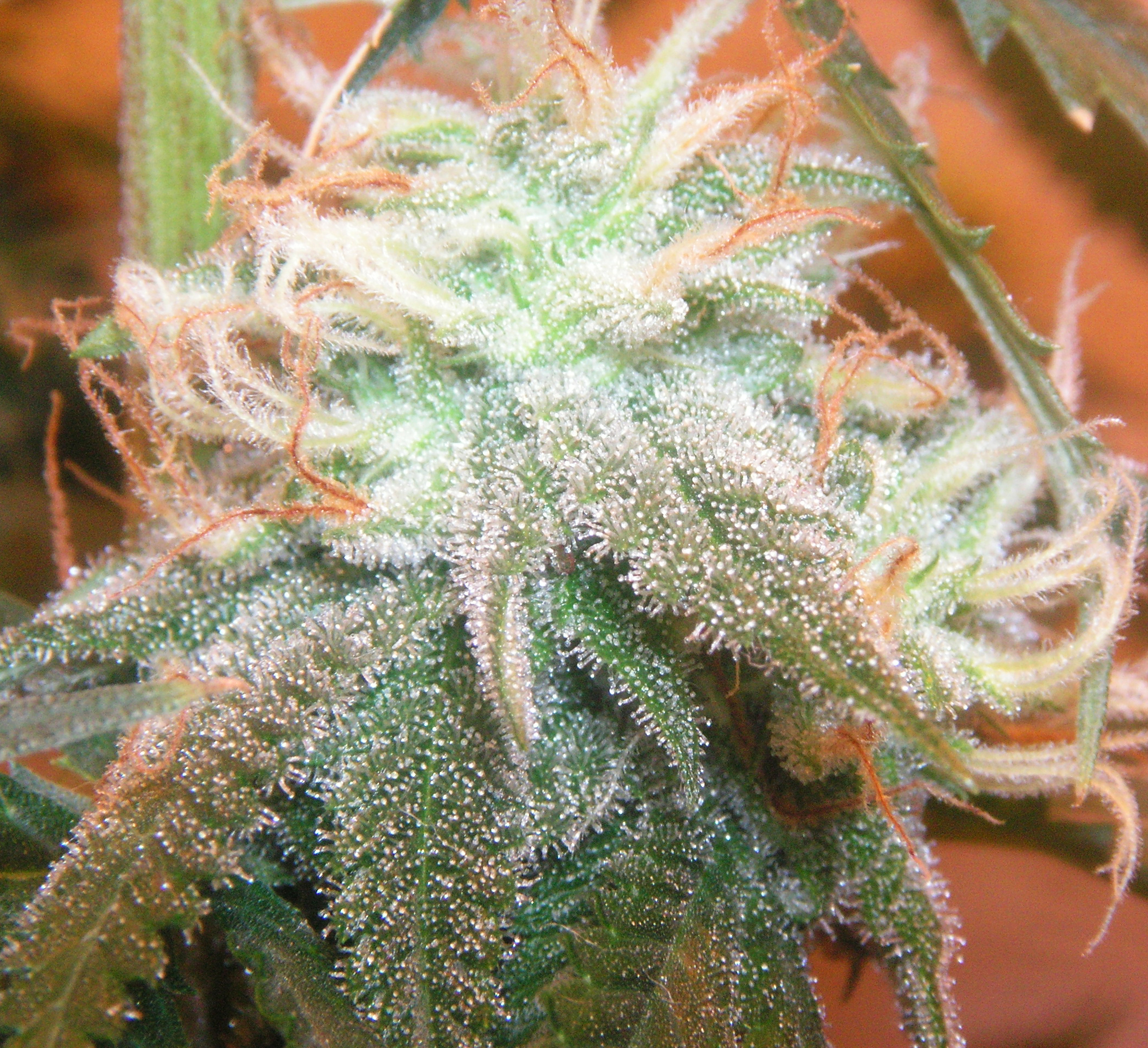
Cannabis female flower with visible trichomes

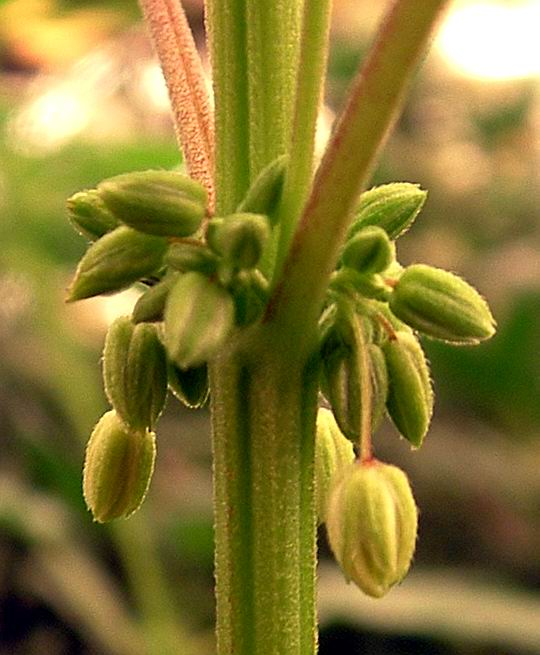
Male Cannabis flower buds

=== Sex determination ===
Cannabis has been described as having one of the most complicated mechanisms of sex determination among the dioecious plants. Many models have been proposed to explain sex determination in Cannabis.

==== Genetic sex determinitaion ====
Based on studies of sex reversal in hemp, it was first reported by K. Hirata in 1924 that an XY sex-determination system is present. At the time, the XY system was the only known system of sex determination. The X:A system was first described in Drosophila spp in 1925. Soon thereafter, Schaffner disputed Hirata's interpretation, and published results from his own studies of sex reversal in hemp, concluding that an X:A system was in use and that furthermore sex was strongly influenced by environmental conditions.

Since then, many different types of sex determination systems have been discovered, particularly in plants. Dioecy is relatively uncommon in the plant kingdom, and a very low percentage of dioecious plant species have been determined to use the XY system. In most cases where the XY system is found it is believed to have evolved recently and independently.

Since the 1920s, a number of sex determination models have been proposed for Cannabis. Ainsworth describes sex determination in the genus as using "an X/autosome dosage type".

The question of whether heteromorphic sex chromosomes are indeed present is most conveniently answered if such chromosomes were clearly visible in a karyotype. Cannabis was one of the first plant species to be karyotyped; however, this was in a period when karyotype preparation was primitive by modern standards. Heteromorphic sex chromosomes were reported to occur in staminate individuals of dioecious "Kentucky" hemp, but were not found in pistillate individuals of the same variety. Dioecious "Kentucky" hemp was assumed to use an XY mechanism. Heterosomes were not observed in analyzed individuals of monoecious "Kentucky" hemp, nor in an unidentified German cultivar. These varieties were assumed to have sex chromosome composition XX. According to other researchers, no modern karyotype of Cannabis had been published as of 1996. Proponents of the XY system state that Y chromosome is slightly larger than the X, but difficult to differentiate cytologically.

More recently, Sakamoto and various co-authors have used random amplification of polymorphic DNA (RAPD) to isolate several genetic marker sequences that they name Male-Associated DNA in Cannabis (MADC), and which they interpret as indirect evidence of a male chromosome. Several other research groups have reported identification of male-associated markers using RAPD and amplified fragment length polymorphism. Ainsworth commented on these findings, stating,

It is not surprising that male-associated markers are relatively abundant. In dioecious plants where sex chromosomes have not been identified, markers for maleness indicate either the presence of sex chromosomes which have not been distinguished by cytological methods or that the marker is tightly linked to a gene involved in sex determination.

A polymerase chain reaction-based method for the detection of female-associated DNA polymorphisms by genotyping has been developed.

==== Environmental sex determination ====
Environmental sex determination is known to occur in a variety of species. Many researchers have suggested that sex in Cannabis is determined or strongly influenced by environmental factors. Experiments with plant hormone treatment has revealed that treatment with auxin and ethylene have feminizing effects while treat with cytokinins and gibberellins have masculinizing effects.

Inducing sex-reversal (causing the growth of opposite-sex flowers) of Cannabis is agriculturally useful because it allows hybridizing plants of the same genetic sex, producing seeds that are genetically single-sexed, which is in turn useful in the cannabinoid-focused sectors (medical and recreational cannabis) as they use female flowers as raw material. Many sex-reversal agents bear no resemblance to plant hormones and work through unknown mechanisms. For example, masculinization is most commonly induced with a variety of silver compounds, including silver thiosulfate, silver nitrate, and colloidal silver (silver oxide nanoparticle). Other masculinization compounds include aminoethoxyvinylglycine and cobalt chloride. Practical feminizing compounds include ethephon (an ethylene releaser).

Induced sex-reversal does not remove all effects of genetic sex. Induced sex-reversal produces defects such as decreased pollen viability and germinability. Still, enough viable pollens are produced through this method for it to be useful.

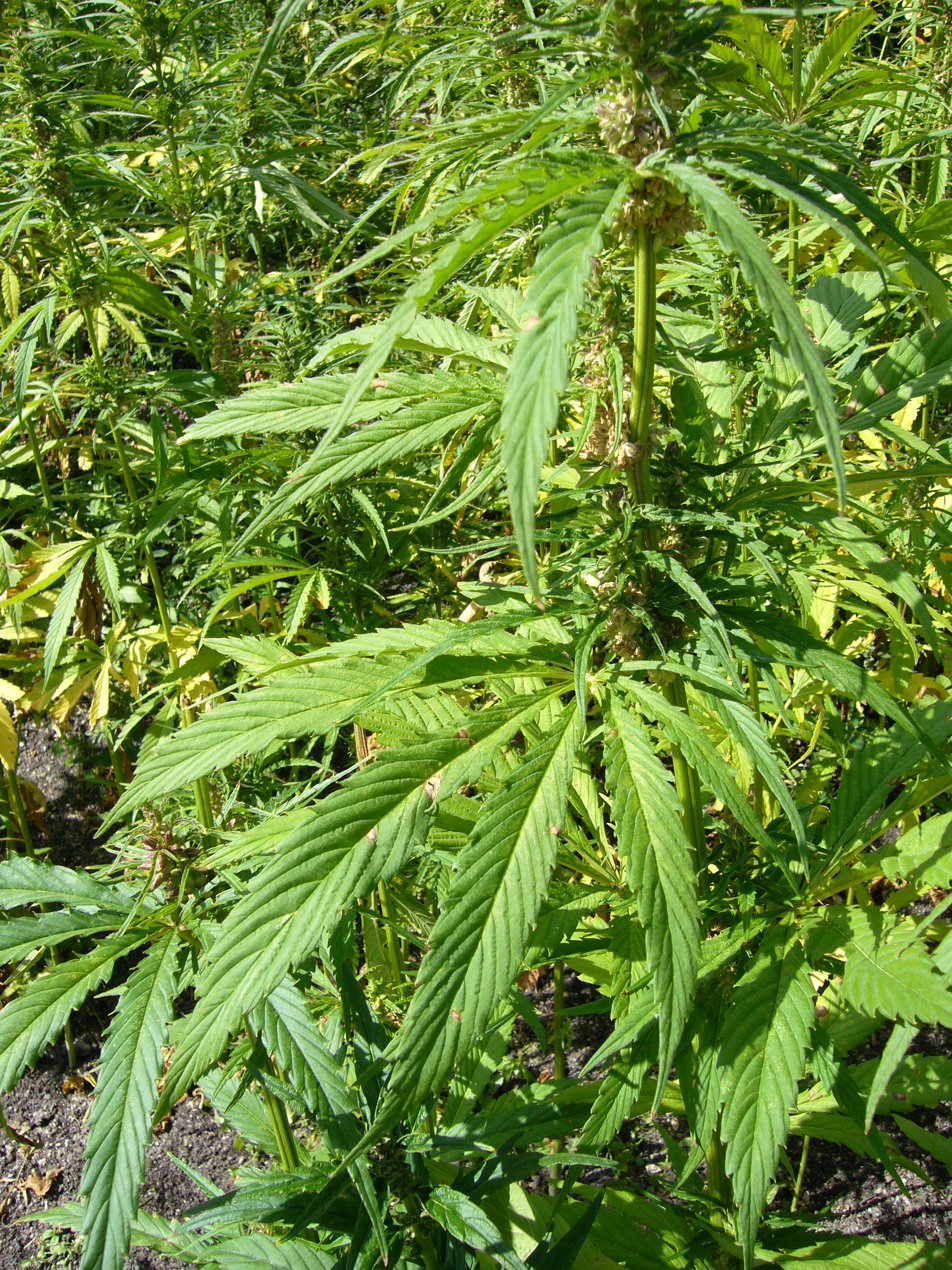
A male hemp plant

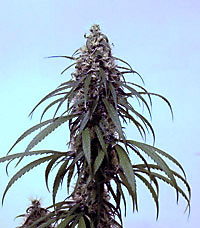
Dense raceme of female flowers typical of drug-type varieties of Cannabis

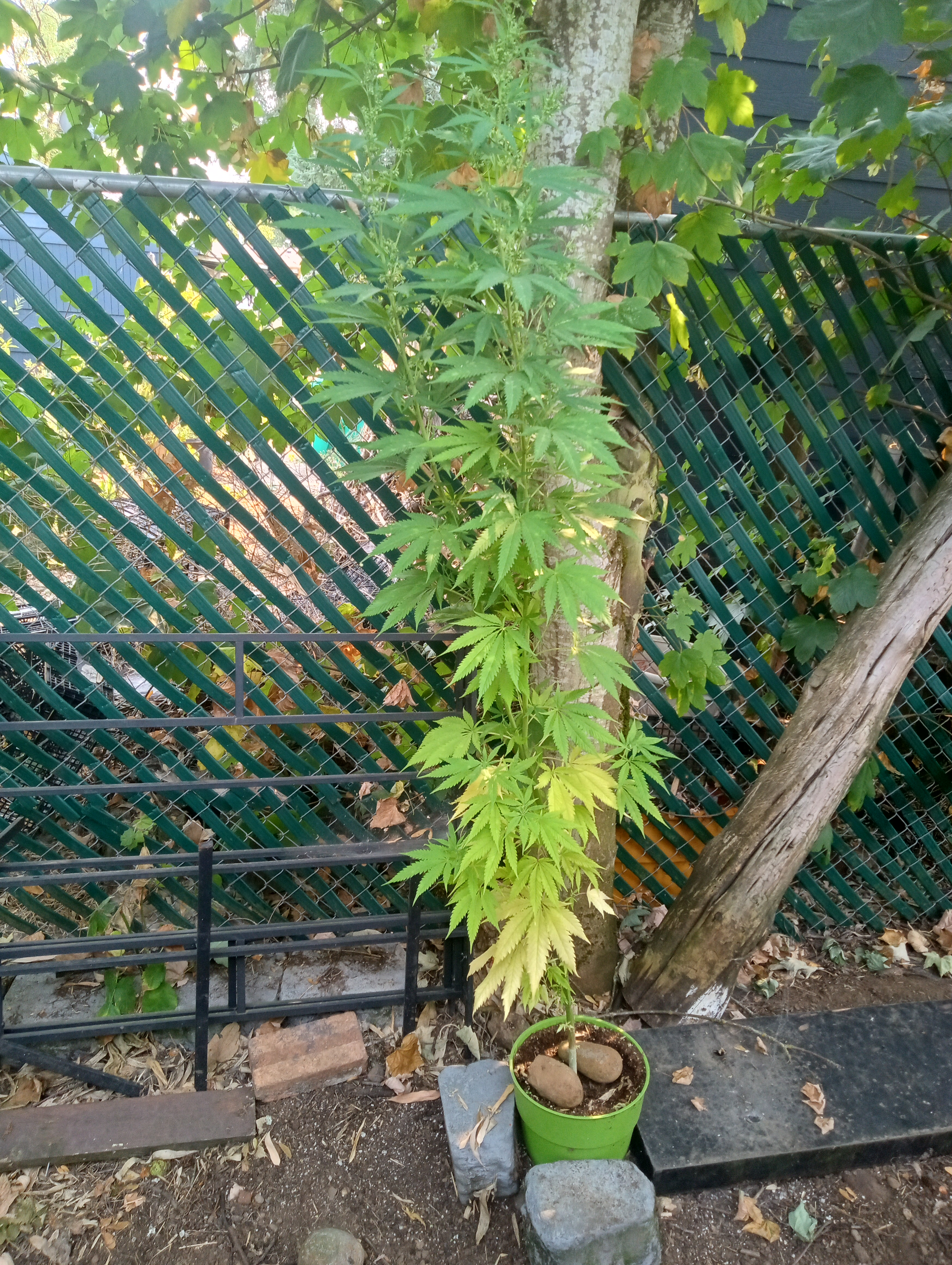
Male Lemon Kush cannabis plant (12 foot plant)

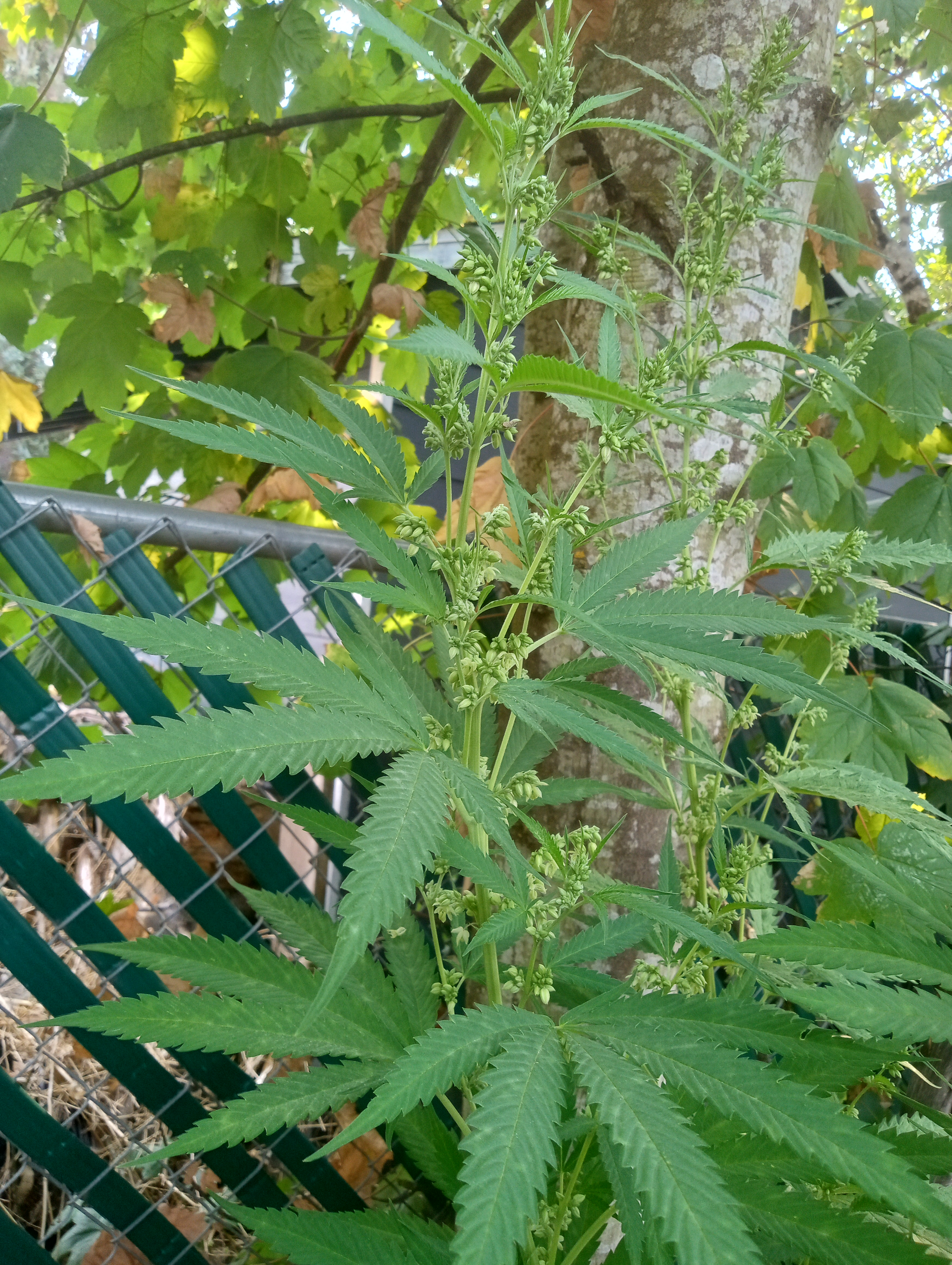
Male Lemon Kush cannabis Flowers

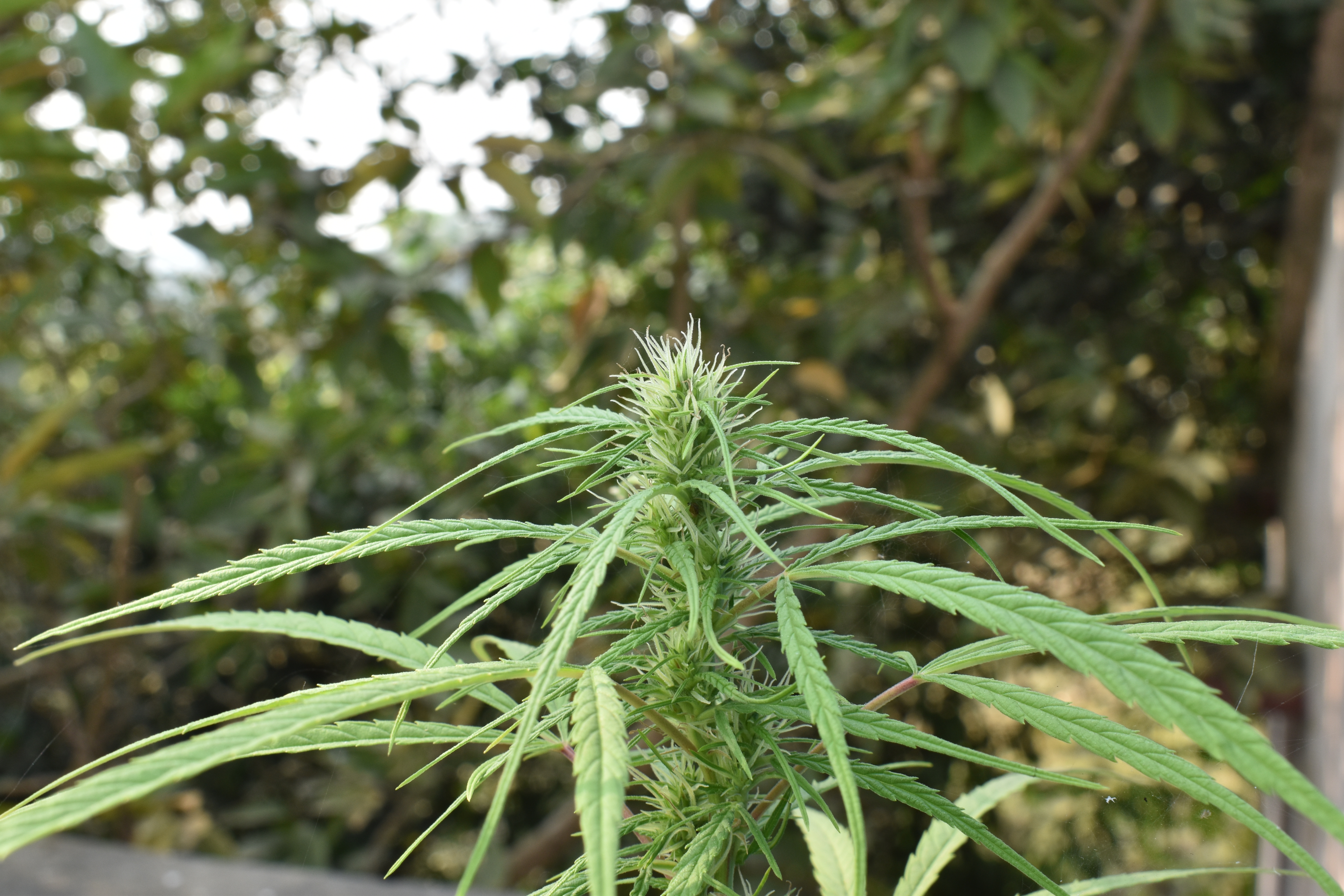
Cannabis flower buds

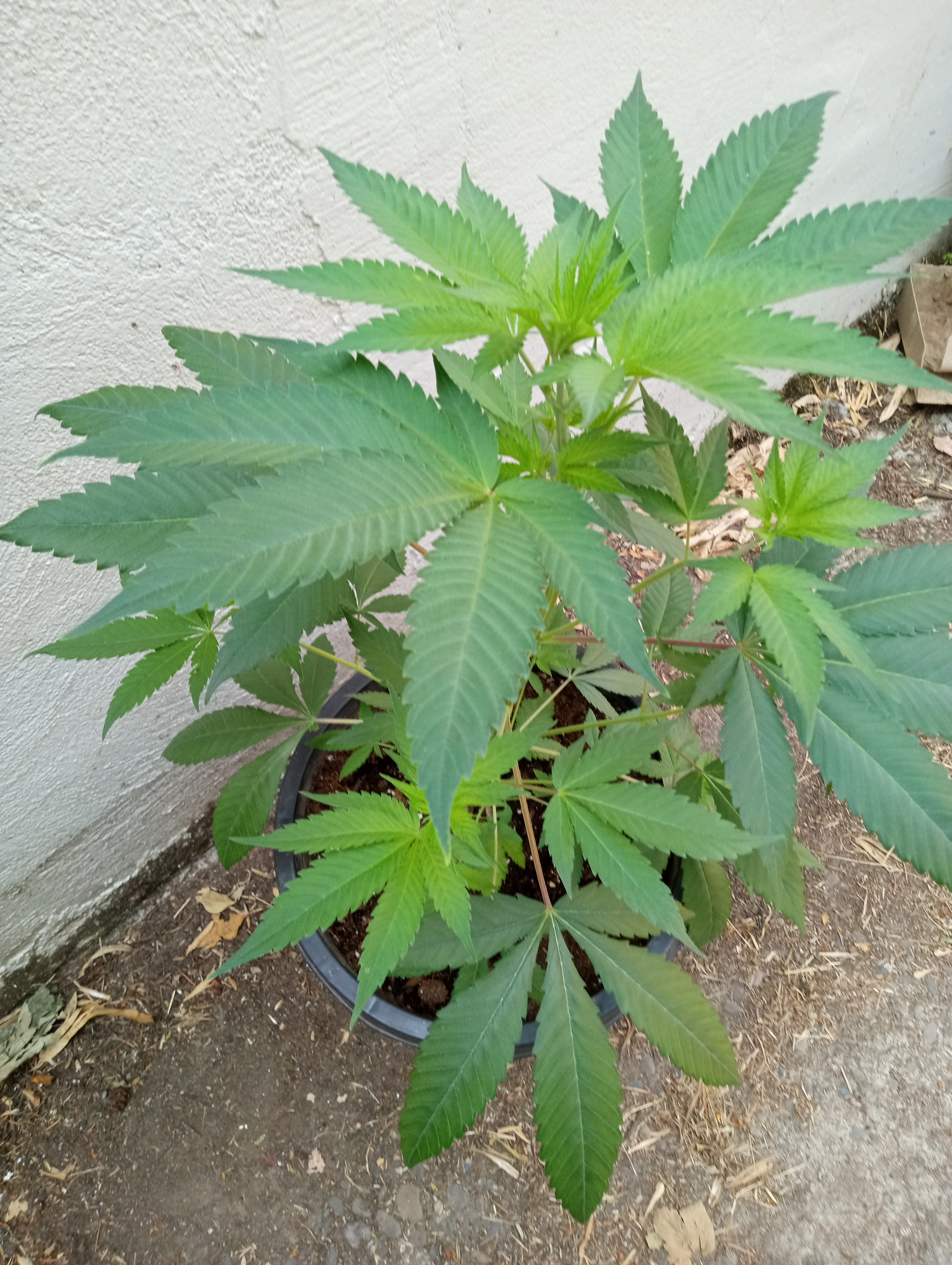
A young female Acapulco Gold plant (Mexican x Nepalese). Seed grown plant from seeds obtained from a cannabis seed bank.

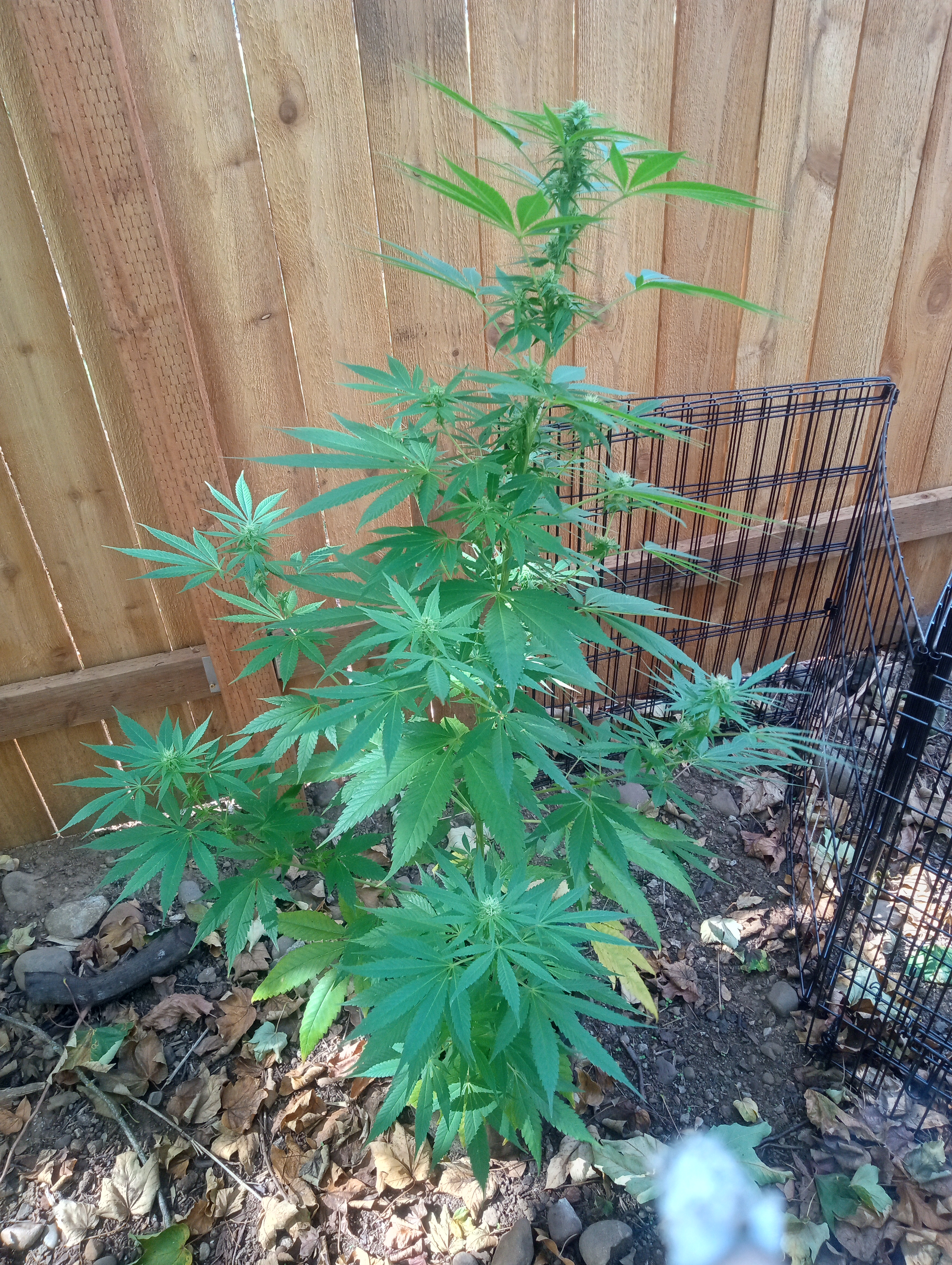
Acapulco Gold female plant in bloom

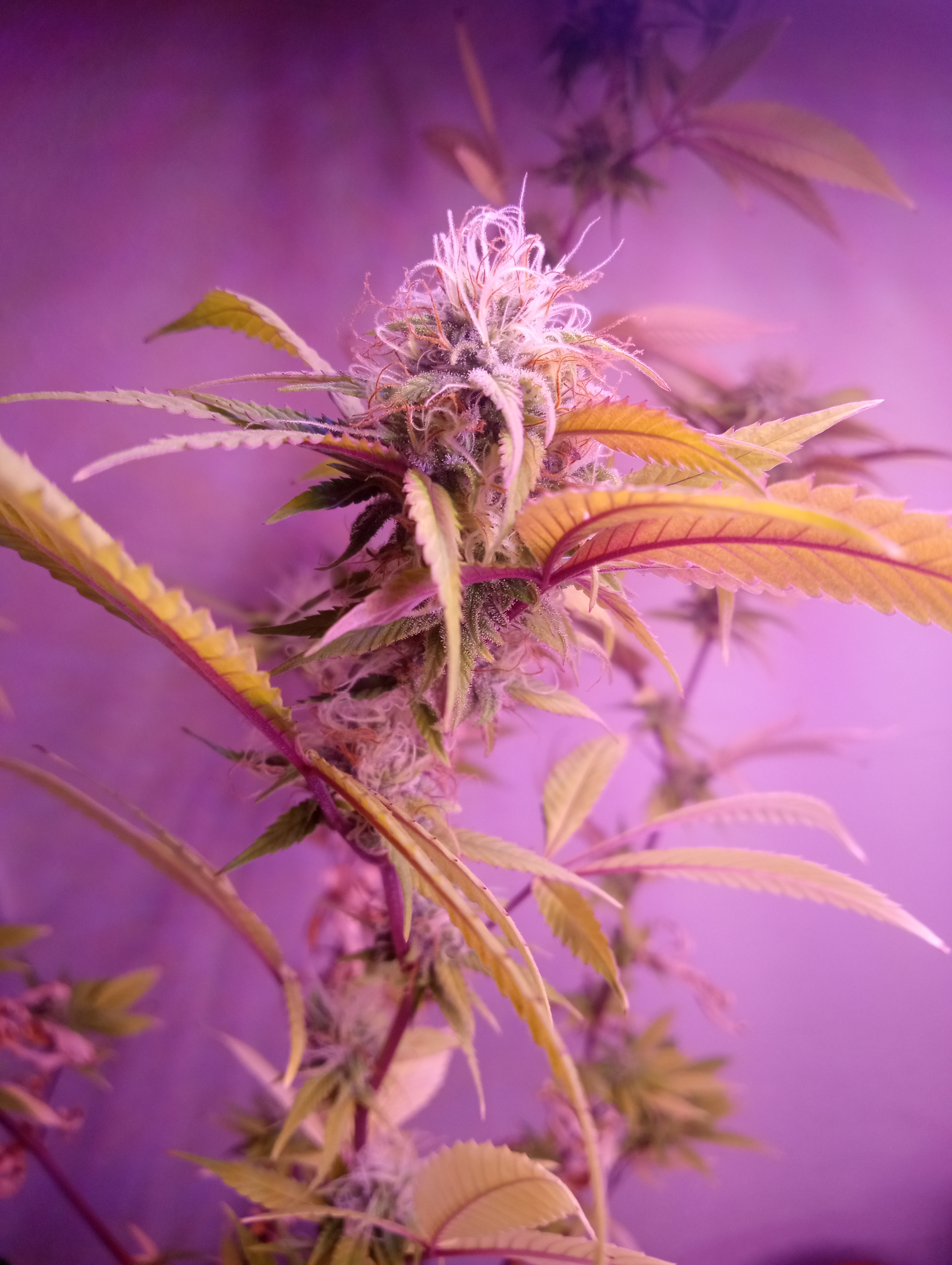
Indoor grown Acapulco Gold female plant in final stages of flowering

=== Chemistry ===
Cannabis plants produce a large number of chemicals as part of their defense against herbivory. One group of these is called cannabinoids, which induce mental and physical effects when consumed.

Cannabinoids, terpenes, terpenoids, and other compounds are secreted by glandular trichomes that occur most abundantly on the floral calyxes and bracts of female plants.

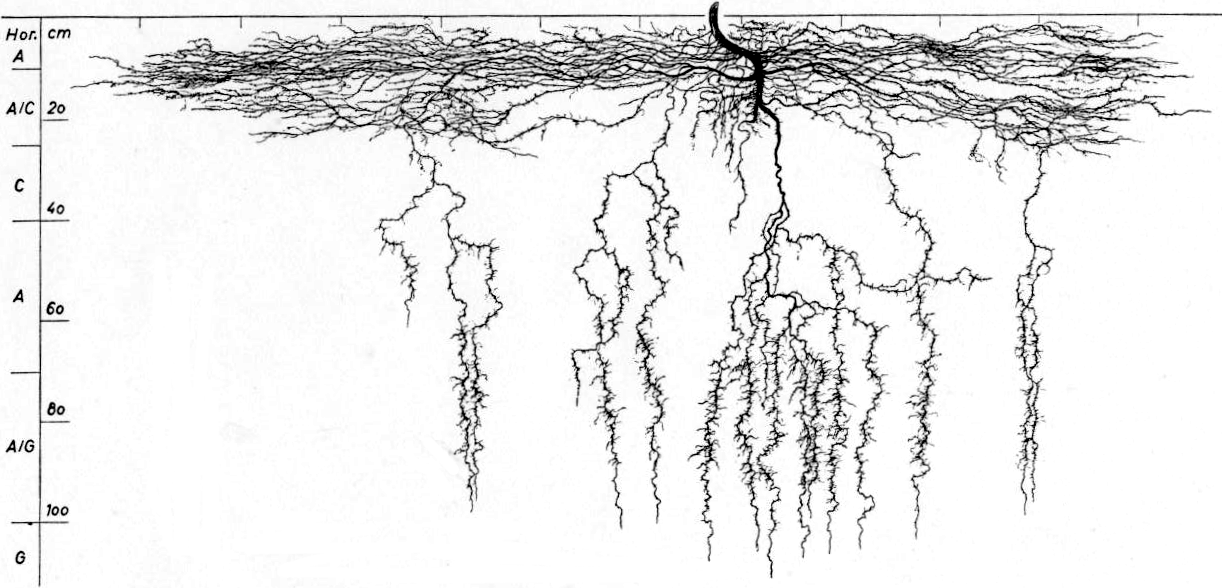
Root system side view

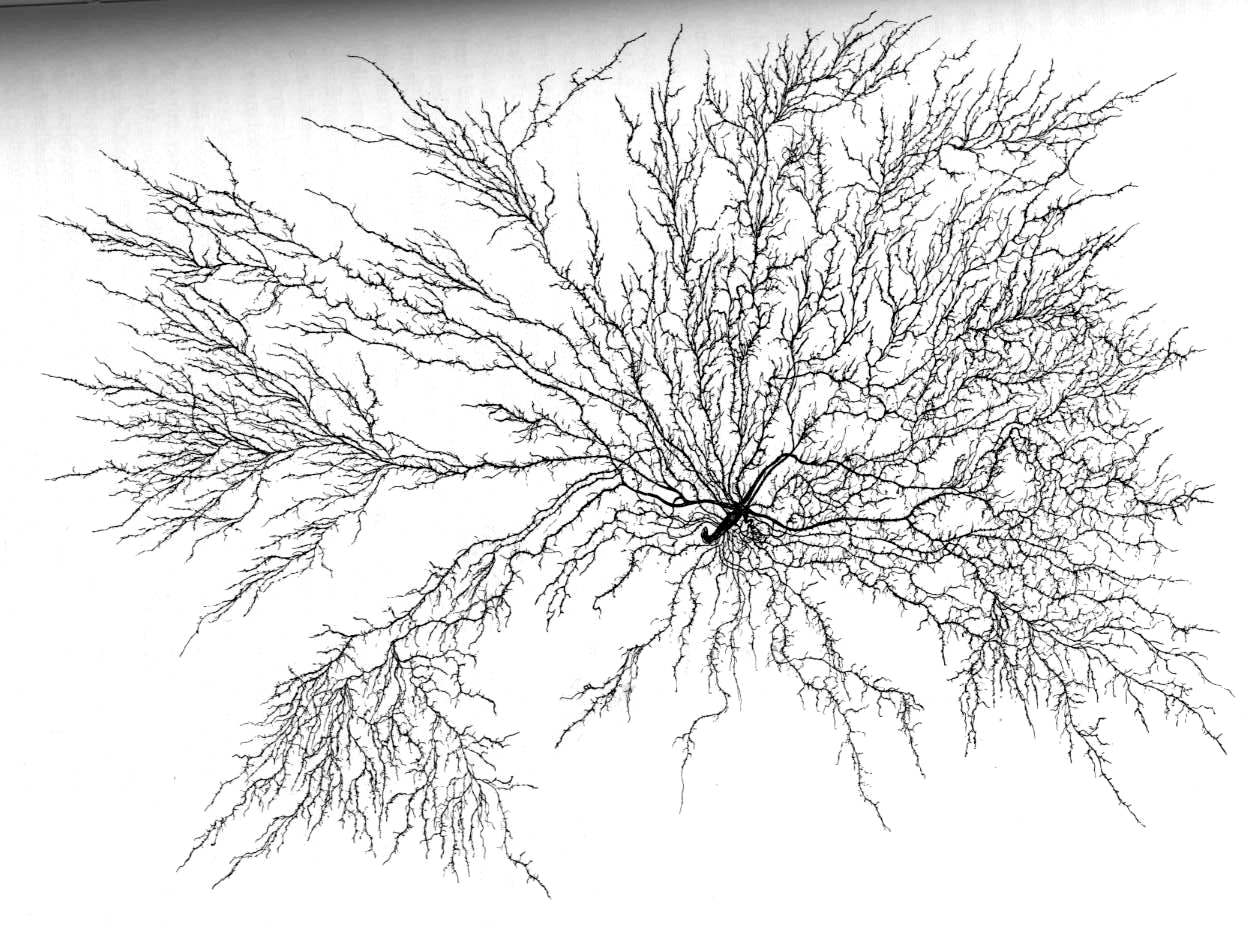
Root system top view

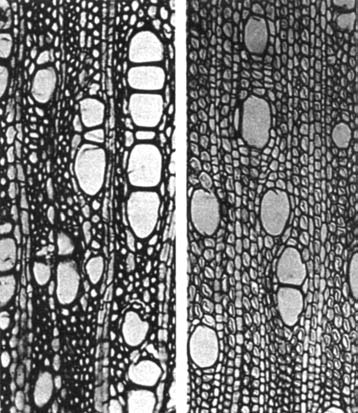
Micrograph C. sativa (left), C. indica (right)

=== Genetics ===
Cannabis, like many organisms, is diploid, having a chromosome complement of 2n=20, although polyploid individuals have been artificially produced. The first genome sequence of Cannabis, which is estimated to be 820 Mb in size, was published in 2011 by a team of Canadian scientists.

== Taxonomy ==
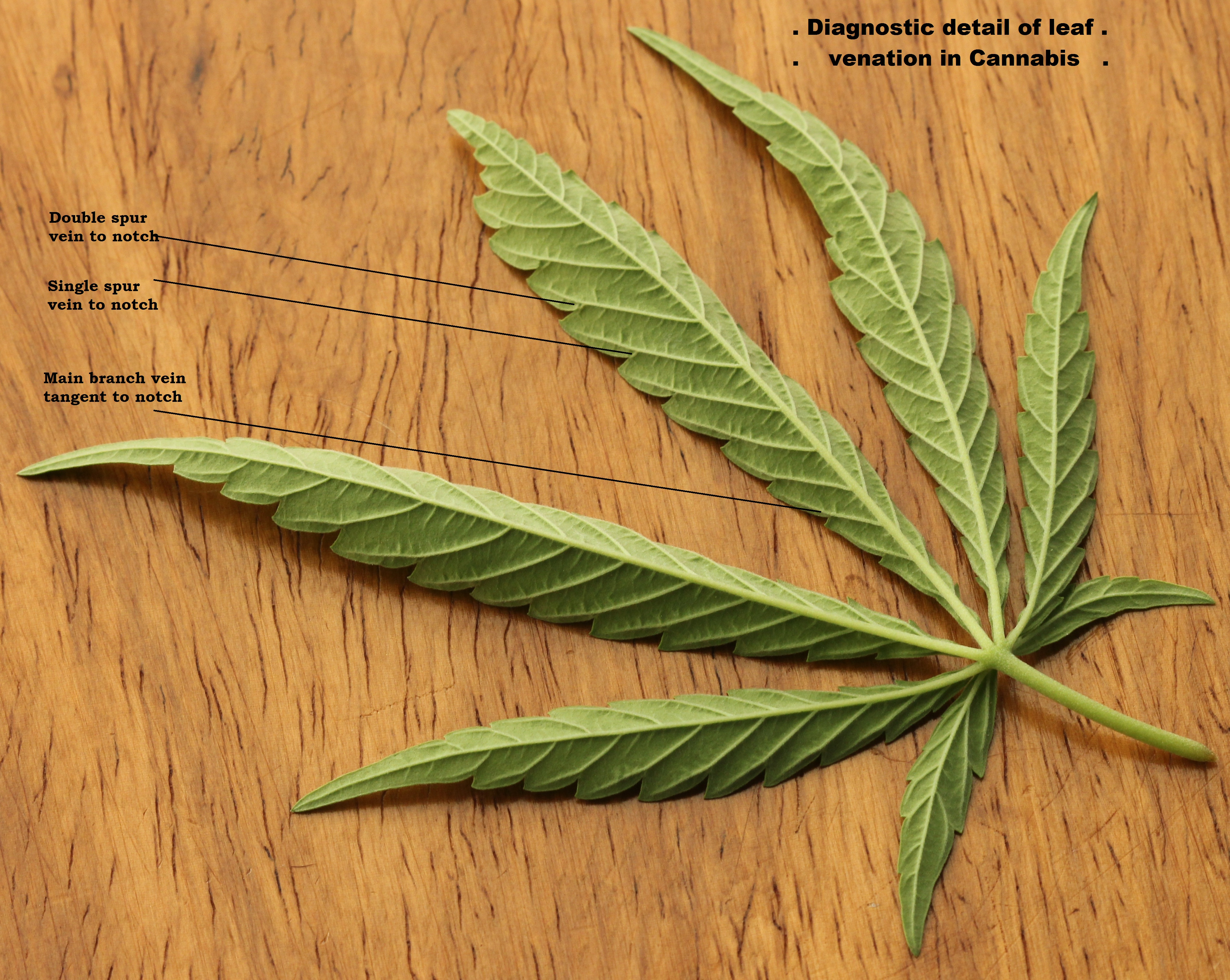
Underside of Cannabis sativa leaf, showing diagnostic venation

The genus Cannabis was formerly placed in the nettle family (Urticaceae) or mulberry family (Moraceae), and later, along with the genus Humulus (hops), in a separate family, the hemp family (Cannabaceae sensu stricto). Recent phylogenetic studies based on cpDNA restriction site analysis and gene sequencing strongly suggest that the Cannabaceae sensu stricto arose from within the former family Celtidaceae, and that the two families should be merged to form a single monophyletic family, the Cannabaceae sensu lato.

Various types of Cannabis have been described, and variously classified as species, subspecies, or varieties:

- plants cultivated for fiber and seed production, described as low-intoxicant, non-drug, or fiber types.
- plants cultivated for drug production, described as high-intoxicant or drug types.
- escaped, hybridised, or wild forms of either of the above types.

Cannabis plants produce a unique family of terpeno-phenolic compounds called cannabinoids, some of which produce the "high" which may be experienced from consuming marijuana. There are 483 identifiable chemical constituents known to exist in the cannabis plant, and at least 85 different cannabinoids have been isolated from the plant. The two cannabinoids usually produced in greatest abundance are cannabidiol (CBD) and/or Δ^{9}-tetrahydrocannabinol (THC), but only THC is psychoactive. Since the early 1970s, Cannabis plants have been categorized by their chemical phenotype or "chemotype", based on the overall amount of THC produced, and on the ratio of THC to CBD. Although overall cannabinoid production is influenced by environmental factors, the THC/CBD ratio is genetically determined and remains fixed throughout the life of a plant. Non-drug plants produce relatively low levels of THC and high levels of CBD, while drug plants produce high levels of THC and low levels of CBD. When plants of these two chemotypes cross-pollinate, the plants in the first filial (F_{1}) generation have an intermediate chemotype and produce intermediate amounts of CBD and THC. Female plants of this chemotype may produce enough THC to be utilized for drug production.

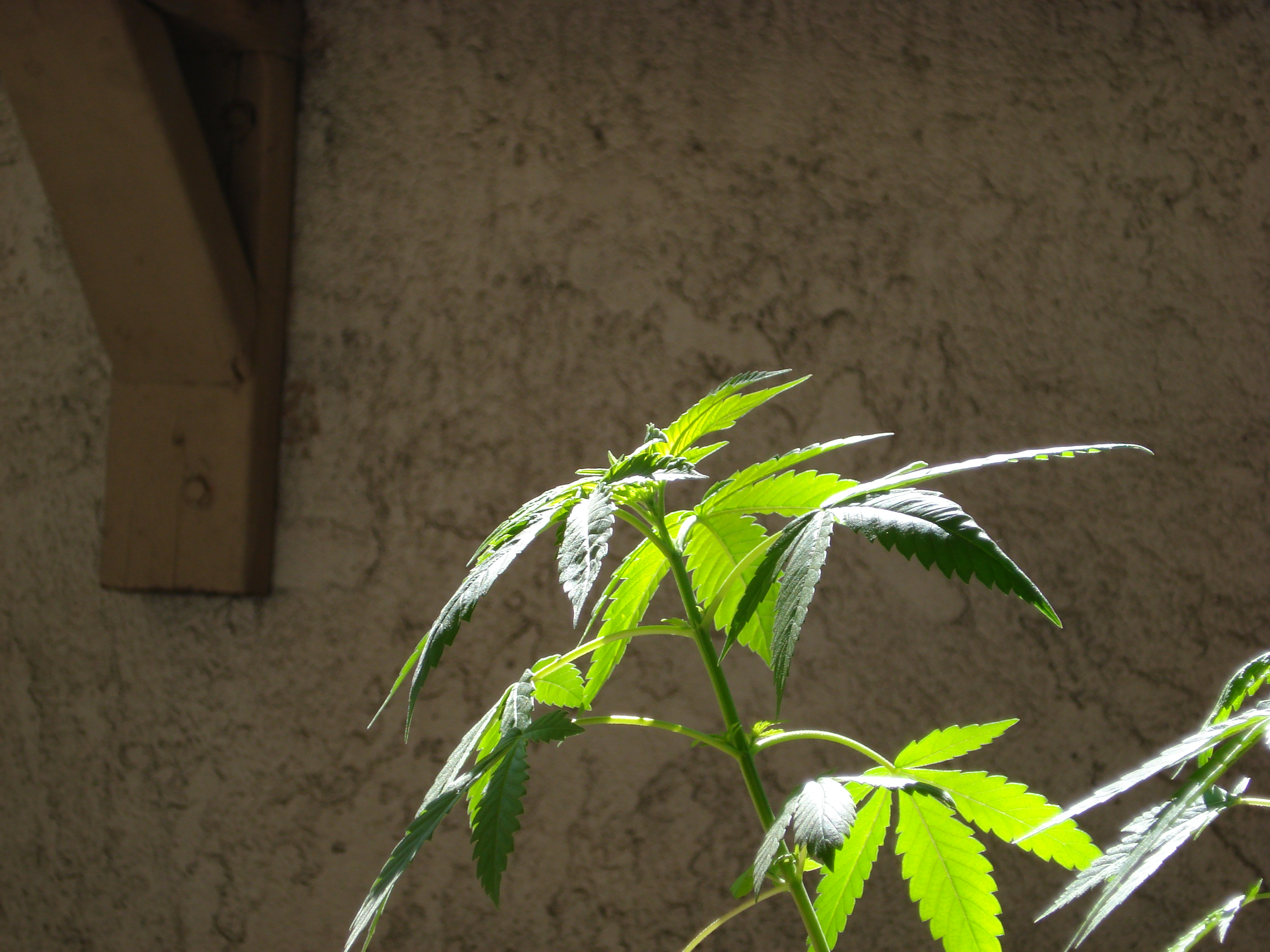
Top of Cannabis plant in vegetative growth stage

Whether the drug and non-drug, cultivated and wild types of Cannabis constitute a single, highly variable species, or the genus is polytypic with more than one species, has been a subject of debate for well over two centuries. This is a contentious issue because there is no universally accepted definition of a species. One widely applied criterion for species recognition is that species are "groups of actually or potentially interbreeding natural populations which are reproductively isolated from other such groups." Populations that are physiologically capable of interbreeding, but morphologically or genetically divergent and isolated by geography or ecology, are sometimes considered to be separate species. Physiological barriers to reproduction are not known to occur within Cannabis, and plants from widely divergent sources are interfertile. However, physical barriers to gene exchange (such as the Himalayan mountain range) might have enabled Cannabis gene pools to diverge before the onset of human intervention, resulting in speciation. It remains controversial whether sufficient morphological and genetic divergence occurs within the genus as a result of geographical or ecological isolation to justify recognition of more than one species.

=== Early classifications ===
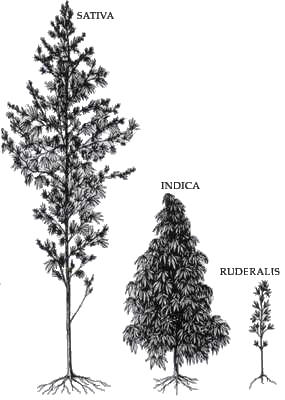
Relative size of varieties of Cannabis

The genus Cannabis was first classified using the "modern" system of taxonomic nomenclature by Carl Linnaeus in 1753, who devised the system still in use for the naming of species. He considered the genus to be monotypic, having just a single species that he named Cannabis sativa L. (Note: "L." stands for Linnaeus, and indicates the authority who first named the species) Linnaeus was familiar with European hemp, which was widely cultivated at the time. This classification was supported by Christiaan Hendrik Persoon (in 1807), Lindley (in 1838) and De Candollee (in 1867). These first classification attempts resulted in a four group division:

- Kif (southern hemp - psychoactive)
- Vulgaris (intermediate - psychoactive and fiber)
- Pedemontana (northern hemp - fiber)
- Chinensis (northern hemp - fiber)

In 1785, evolutionary biologist Jean-Baptiste de Lamarck published a description of a second species of Cannabis, which he named Cannabis indica Lam. Lamarck based his description of the newly named species on morphological aspects (trichomes, leaf shape) and geographic localization of plant specimens collected in India. He described C. indica as having poorer fiber quality than C. sativa, but greater utility as an inebriant. Also, C. indica was considered smaller, by Lamarck. Also, woodier stems, alternate ramifications of the branches, narrow leaflets, and a villous calyx in the female flowers were characteristics noted by the botanist.

In 1843, William O'Shaughnessy, used "Indian hemp (C. indica)" in a work title. The author claimed that this choice wasn't based on a clear distinction between C. sativa and C. indica, but may have been influenced by the choice to use the term "Indian hemp" (linked to the plant's history in India), hence naming the species as indica.

Additional Cannabis species were proposed in the 19th century, including strains from China and Vietnam (Indo-China) assigned the names Cannabis chinensis Delile, and Cannabis gigantea Delile ex Vilmorin. However, many taxonomists found these putative species difficult to distinguish. In the early 20th century, the single-species concept (monotypic classification) was still widely accepted, except in the Soviet Union, where Cannabis continued to be the subject of active taxonomic study. The name Cannabis indica was listed in various Pharmacopoeias, and was widely used to designate Cannabis suitable for the manufacture of medicinal preparations.

=== 20th century ===
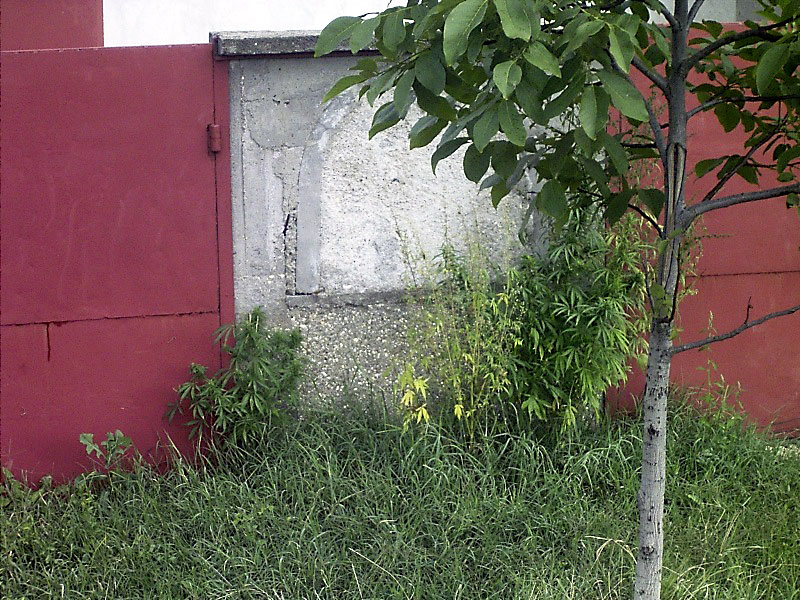
Cannabis ruderalis

In 1924, Russian botanist D.E. Janichevsky concluded that ruderal Cannabis in central Russia is either a variety of C. sativa or a separate species, and proposed C. sativa L. var. ruderalis Janisch, and Cannabis ruderalis Janisch, as alternative names. In 1929, renowned plant explorer Nikolai Vavilov assigned wild or feral populations of Cannabis in Afghanistan to C. indica Lam. var. kafiristanica Vav., and ruderal populations in Europe to C. sativa L. var. spontanea Vav. Vavilov, in 1931, proposed a three species system, independently reinforced by Schultes et al (1975) and Emboden (1974): C. sativa, C. indica and C. ruderalis.

In 1940, Russian botanists Serebriakova and Sizov proposed a complex poly-species classification in which they also recognized C. sativa and C. indica as separate species. Within C. sativa they recognized two subspecies: C. sativa L. subsp. culta Serebr. (consisting of cultivated plants), and C. sativa L. subsp. spontanea (Vav.) Serebr. (consisting of wild or feral plants). Serebriakova and Sizov split the two C. sativa subspecies into 13 varieties, including four distinct groups within subspecies culta. However, they did not divide C. indica into subspecies or varieties. Zhukovski, in 1950, also proposed a two-species system, but with C. sativa L. and C. ruderalis.

==== The Small scheme ====
In the 1970s, the taxonomic classification of Cannabis took on added significance in North America. Laws prohibiting Cannabis in the United States and Canada specifically named products of C. sativa as prohibited materials. Enterprising attorneys for the defense in a few drug busts argued that the seized Cannabis material may not have been C. sativa, and was therefore not prohibited by law. Attorneys on both sides recruited botanists to provide expert testimony. Among those testifying for the prosecution was Dr. Ernest Small, while Dr. Richard E. Schultes and others testified for the defense. The botanists engaged in heated debate (outside of court), and both camps impugned the other's integrity. The defense attorneys were not often successful in winning their case, because the intent of the law was clear.

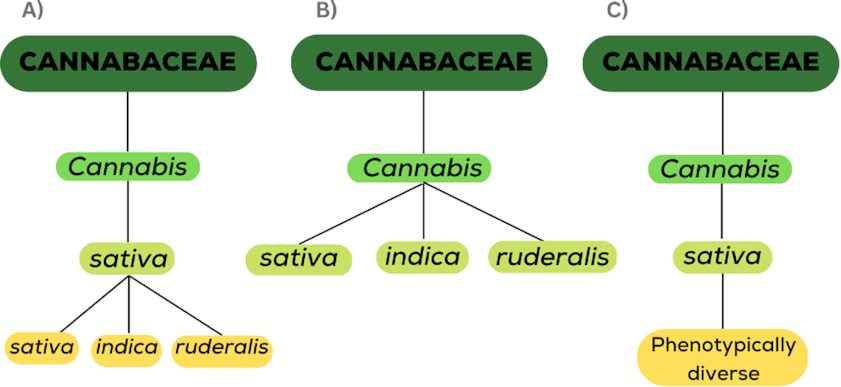
Three theories of classification for Cannabis. From left to right, monotypic with three subspecies (A), polytypic consisting of up to three species (B), and single phenotypically diverse species (C).

In 1976, Canadian botanist Ernest Small and American taxonomist Arthur Cronquist published a taxonomic revision that recognizes a single species of Cannabis with two subspecies (hemp or drug; based on THC and CBD levels) and two varieties in each (domesticated or wild). The framework is thus:

- C. sativa subsp. sativa L., presumably selected for traits that enhance fiber or seed production.
  - C. sativa subsp. sativa var. sativa, domesticated variety.
  - C. sativa subsp. sativa var. spontanea Vav., wild or escaped variety.
- C. sativa subsp. indica (Lam.) Small & Cronq., primarily selected for drug production.
  - C. sativa subsp. indica var. indica, domesticated variety.
  - C. sativa subsp. indica var. kafiristanica (Vav.) Small & Cronq, wild or escaped variety.

This classification was based on several factors including interfertility, chromosome uniformity, chemotype, and numerical analysis of phenotypic characters.

==== The Schultes scheme ====
Professors William Emboden, Loran Anderson, and Harvard botanist Richard E. Schultes and coworkers also conducted taxonomic studies of Cannabis in the 1970s, and concluded that stable morphological differences exist that support recognition of at least three species, C. sativa, C. indica, and C. ruderalis. For Schultes, this was a reversal of his previous interpretation that Cannabis is monotypic, with only a single species. According to Schultes' and Anderson's descriptions, C. sativa is tall and laxly branched with relatively narrow leaflets, C. indica is shorter, conical in shape, and has relatively wide leaflets, and C. ruderalis is short, branchless, and grows wild in Central Asia. This taxonomic interpretation was embraced by Cannabis aficionados who commonly distinguish narrow-leafed "sativa" strains from wide-leafed "indica" strains. McPartland's review finds the Schultes taxonomy inconsistent with prior work (protologs) and partly responsible for the popular usage.

==== Popular usage ====
The scientific debate regarding taxonomy has had little effect on the terminology in widespread use among cultivators and users of drug-type Cannabis. Cannabis aficionados recognize three distinct types based on such factors as morphology, native range, aroma, and subjective psychoactive characteristics. "Sativa" is the most widespread variety, which is usually tall, laxly branched, and found in warm lowland regions. "Indica" designates shorter, bushier plants adapted to cooler climates and highland environments. "Ruderalis" is the informal name for the short plants that grow wild in Europe and Central Asia. The popular scheme is roughly based on Schultes's framework, with some added emphasis on subjective effects.

"Ruderalis" is a very vague concept in popular taxonomy. It may refer to any plant that exhibits wild-type morphology, early flowering (day-neutral flowering, "autoflowering"), or roughly equal CBD and THC levels.

=== Continuing research ===
Molecular analytical techniques developed in the late 20th century are being applied to questions of taxonomic classification. This has resulted in many reclassifications based on evolutionary systematics. Several studies of random amplified polymorphic DNA (RAPD) and other types of genetic markers have been conducted on drug and fiber strains of Cannabis, primarily for plant breeding and forensic purposes. Dutch Cannabis researcher E.P.M. de Meijer and coworkers described some of their RAPD studies as showing an "extremely high" degree of genetic polymorphism between and within populations, suggesting a high degree of potential variation for selection, even in heavily selected hemp cultivars. They also commented that these analyses confirm the continuity of the Cannabis gene pool throughout the studied accessions, and provide further confirmation that the genus consists of a single species, although theirs was not a systematic study per se.

An investigation of genetic, morphological, and chemotaxonomic variation among 157 Cannabis accessions of known geographic origin, including fiber, drug, and feral populations showed cannabinoid variation in Cannabis germplasm. The patterns of cannabinoid variation support recognition of C. sativa and C. indica as separate species, but not C. ruderalis. C. sativa contains fiber and seed landraces, and feral populations, derived from Europe, Central Asia, and Turkey. Narrow-leaflet and wide-leaflet drug accessions, southern and eastern Asian hemp accessions, and feral Himalayan populations were assigned to C. indica. In 2005, a genetic analysis of the same set of accessions led to a three-species classification, recognizing C. sativa, C. indica, and (tentatively) C. ruderalis. Another paper in the series on chemotaxonomic variation in the terpenoid content of the essential oil of Cannabis revealed that several wide-leaflet drug strains in the collection had relatively high levels of certain sesquiterpene alcohols, including guaiol and isomers of eudesmol, that set them apart from the other putative taxa.

A 2015 analysis of single-nucleotide polymorphisms (SNPs) found a clear divide between the drug/resin and hemp/fiber varieties, lending credence to the botanic (Small's) classification scheme.

A 2020 analysis of SNPs reports five clusters of Cannabis. K1 through K3 form a larger cluster corresponding to folk "indica". K4 corresponds to folk "sativa". K5 is a non-resin (fiber/hemp) cluster.

=== Translating between schemes ===
There is currently a great conflict between the different schemes of Cannabis nomenclature due to the split from botanic orthodoxy initiated by many errors of Schultes, which is further modified by folk usage.

SNP and chemical clusters of Cannabis and their names
Henry et al. (2020)					Folk (subjective effect)	Botanic (Small)
Cluster	Terpene	Cannabinoid	Locale	DAPC	Folk (subjective effect)	Botanic (Small)
K1	myrcene, limonene, linalool	THC, CBC		Indica	Indica	indica
K2	p-cymene, carene	CBD, CBC	United States	Indica	High-CBD	indica
K3	myrcene, a-pinene	THC, CBC		Indica	Indica	indica
K4	terpenolene, ocimene, caryophyllene	THC, CBG	Equatorial	Sativa	Sativa	indica
K5	none (not resin-type)	CBD	Europe	Ruderalis	Hemp	sativa

Morphological types of Cannabis and their names
Leaflet	Habit	Maturation	Locale	Folk (Schultes)	Botanic (Small)
Narrow	slender and tall	late	India (descendants in Thailand, South and East Africa, Colombia, and Mexico)	Sativa	indica var. indica
Broad	compact	early	Afghanistan	Indica	sativa var. afghanica (or kafiristanica)
Broad	extremely short, unbranched	early	Central Asia	Ruderalis	sativa, escape

Breeders, seed companies, and cultivators of drug type Cannabis often describe the ancestry or gross phenotypic characteristics of cultivars by categorizing them as "pure indica", "mostly indica", "indica/sativa", "mostly sativa", or "pure sativa". These categories are highly arbitrary and borderline meaningless due to the current nomenclatural confusion. For example:

- One "AK-47" hybrid strain has received both "Best Sativa" and "Best Indica" awards.
- According to a 2018 news report from CBC, a laboratory at the University of British Columbia found that Jamaican Lamb's Bread, claimed to be 100% Sativa, was in fact almost 100% indica. This is a result of conflicting concepts of names: the lab's concept of indica refers to the botanic concept of non-psychoactive Cannabis.

Legalization of cannabis in Canada (as of 17 October 2018) may help spur private-sector research, especially in terms of diversification of strains. It is also hoped improve classification accuracy for cannabis used recreationally. Legalization coupled with Canadian government (Health Canada) oversight of production and labelling will likely result in more—and more accurate—testing to determine exact strains and content. Furthermore, the rise of craft cannabis growers in Canada should ensure quality, experimentation/research, and diversification of strains among private-sector producers. However, there exists a large discrapency of Cannabis nomenclature even in the research sphere. Simply improving classification techniques will not solve the ambiguity of names until an agreement is reached. For example, the 2015 and 2020 SNP studies mentioned above are both conducted at Canadian universities, but they use opposite nomenclatural concepts: the 2015 study adoptes the botanic terminology while the 2020 study adopts the folk (subject effect) terminology.

=== Phylogeny ===
Cannabis likely split from its closest relative, Humulus (hops), during the mid Oligocene, around 27.8 million years ago according to molecular clock estimates. The centre of origin of Cannabis is likely in the northeastern Tibetan Plateau. The pollen of Humulus and Cannabis are very similar and difficult to distinguish. The oldest pollen thought to be from Cannabis is from Ningxia, China, on the boundary between the Tibetan Plateau and the Loess Plateau, dating to the early Miocene, around 19.6 million years ago. Cannabis was widely distributed over Asia by the Late Pleistocene. The oldest known Cannabis in South Asia dates to around 32,000 years ago.

== Uses ==
Cannabis is used for a wide variety of purposes.

=== History ===
According to genetic and archaeological evidence, cannabis was first domesticated about 12,000 years ago in East Asia during the early Neolithic period. The use of cannabis as a mind-altering drug has been documented by archaeological finds in prehistoric societies in Eurasia and Africa. The oldest written record of cannabis usage is the Greek historian Herodotus's reference to the central Eurasian Scythians taking cannabis steam baths. His Histories (c. 440 BCE) records, "The Scythians, as I said, take some of this hemp-seed [presumably, flowers], and, creeping under the felt coverings, throw it upon the red-hot stones; immediately it smokes, and gives out such a vapour as no Greek vapour-bath can exceed; the Scyths, delighted, shout for joy."

In 2019, archeologists from the Chinese Academy of Sciences found the oldest evidence of smoked cannabis from roughly 2,500 years ago in a cemetery in present-day western China in the Pamir Mountains. In China, the psychoactive properties of cannabis are described in the Shennong Bencaojing (3rd century AD). Cannabis smoke was inhaled by Daoists, who burned it in incense burners.

In the Middle East, use spread throughout the Islamic empire to North Africa. In 1545, cannabis spread to the western hemisphere where Spaniards imported it to Chile for its use as fiber. In North America, cannabis, in the form of hemp, was grown for use in rope, cloth and paper.

Cannabinol (CBN) was the first compound to be isolated from cannabis extract in the late 1800s. Its structure and chemical synthesis were achieved by 1940, followed by some of the first preclinical research studies to determine the effects of individual cannabis-derived compounds in vivo.

Globally, in 2013, 60,400 kilograms of cannabis were produced legally.

=== Recreational use ===
Comparison of physical harm and dependence regarding various drugs

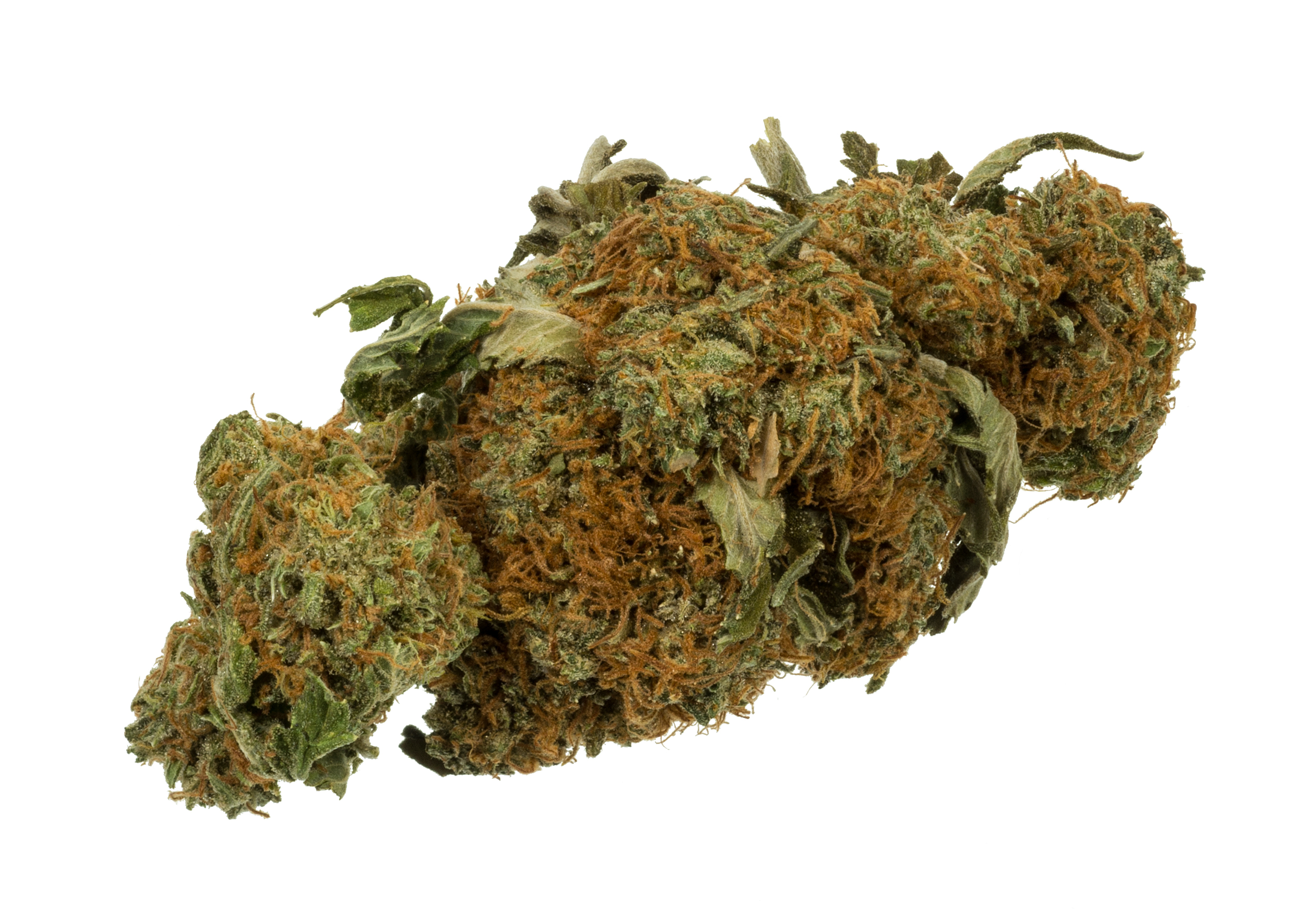
A dried bud, typical of what is sold for recreational use

Cannabis is a popular recreational drug around the world, only behind alcohol, caffeine, and tobacco. In the U.S. alone, it is believed that over 100 million Americans have tried cannabis, with 25 million Americans having used it within the past year. As a drug it usually comes in the form of dried marijuana, hashish, or various extracts collectively known as hashish oil.

Normal cognition is restored after approximately three hours for larger doses via a smoking pipe, bong or vaporizer. However, if a large amount is taken orally the effects may last much longer. After 24 hours to a few days, minuscule psychoactive effects may be felt, depending on dosage, frequency and tolerance to the drug.

Cannabidiol (CBD), which has no intoxicating effects by itself (although sometimes showing a small stimulant effect, similar to caffeine), is thought to reduce the anxiety-inducing effects of high doses of THC, particularly if administered orally prior to THC exposure.

According to Delphic analysis by British researchers in 2007, cannabis has a lower risk factor for dependence compared to both nicotine and alcohol. However, everyday use of cannabis may be correlated with psychological withdrawal symptoms, such as irritability or insomnia, and susceptibility to a panic attack may increase as levels of THC metabolites rise. Cannabis withdrawal symptoms are typically mild and are not life-threatening. Risk of adverse outcomes from cannabis use may be reduced by implementation of evidence-based education and intervention tools communicated to the public with practical regulation measures.

In 2014 there were an estimated 182.5 million cannabis users worldwide (3.8% of the global population aged 15–64). This percentage did not change significantly between 1998 and 2014.

=== Medical use ===
Medical cannabis (or medical marijuana) refers to the use of cannabis and its constituent cannabinoids, in an effort to treat disease or improve symptoms. Cannabis is used to reduce nausea and vomiting during chemotherapy, to improve appetite in people with HIV/AIDS, and to treat chronic pain and muscle spasms. Cannabinoids are under preliminary research for their potential to affect stroke. Evidence is lacking for depression, anxiety, attention deficit hyperactivity disorder, Tourette syndrome, post-traumatic stress disorder, and psychosis. Two extracts of cannabis – dronabinol and nabilone – are approved by the FDA as medications in pill form for treating the side effects of chemotherapy and AIDS.

Short-term use increases both minor and major adverse effects. Common side effects include dizziness, feeling tired, vomiting, and hallucinations. Long-term effects of cannabis are not clear. Concerns including memory and cognition problems, risk of addiction, schizophrenia in young people, and the risk of children taking it by accident.

=== Industrial use (hemp) ===
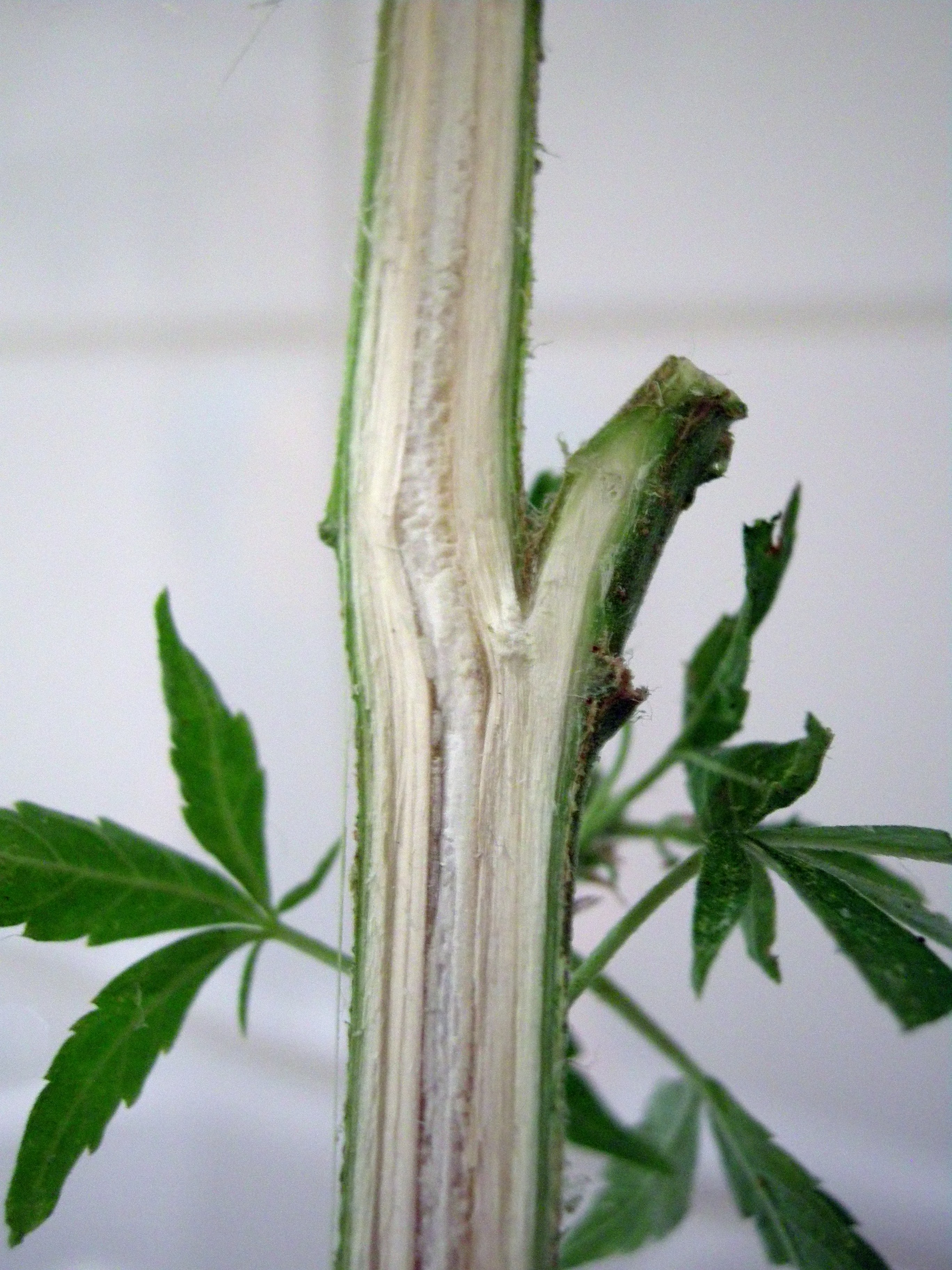
Cannabis sativa stem longitudinal section

The term hemp is used to name the durable soft fiber from the Cannabis plant stem (stalk). Cannabis sativa cultivars are used for fibers due to their long stems; Sativa varieties may grow more than six metres tall. However, hemp can refer to any industrial or foodstuff product that is not intended for use as a drug. Many countries regulate limits for psychoactive compound (THC) concentrations in products labeled as hemp.

Cannabis for industrial uses is valuable in tens of thousands of commercial products, especially as fibre ranging from paper, cordage, construction material and textiles in general, to clothing. Hemp is stronger and longer-lasting than cotton. It also is a useful source of foodstuffs (hemp milk, hemp seed, hemp oil) and biofuels. Hemp has been used by many civilizations, from China to Europe (and later North America) during the last 12,000 years. In modern times novel applications and improvements have been explored with modest commercial success.

In the US, "industrial hemp" is classified by the federal government as cannabis containing no more than 0.3% THC by dry weight. This classification was established in the 2018 Farm Bill and was refined to include hemp-sourced extracts, cannabinoids, and derivatives in the definition of hemp.

=== Ancient and religious uses ===
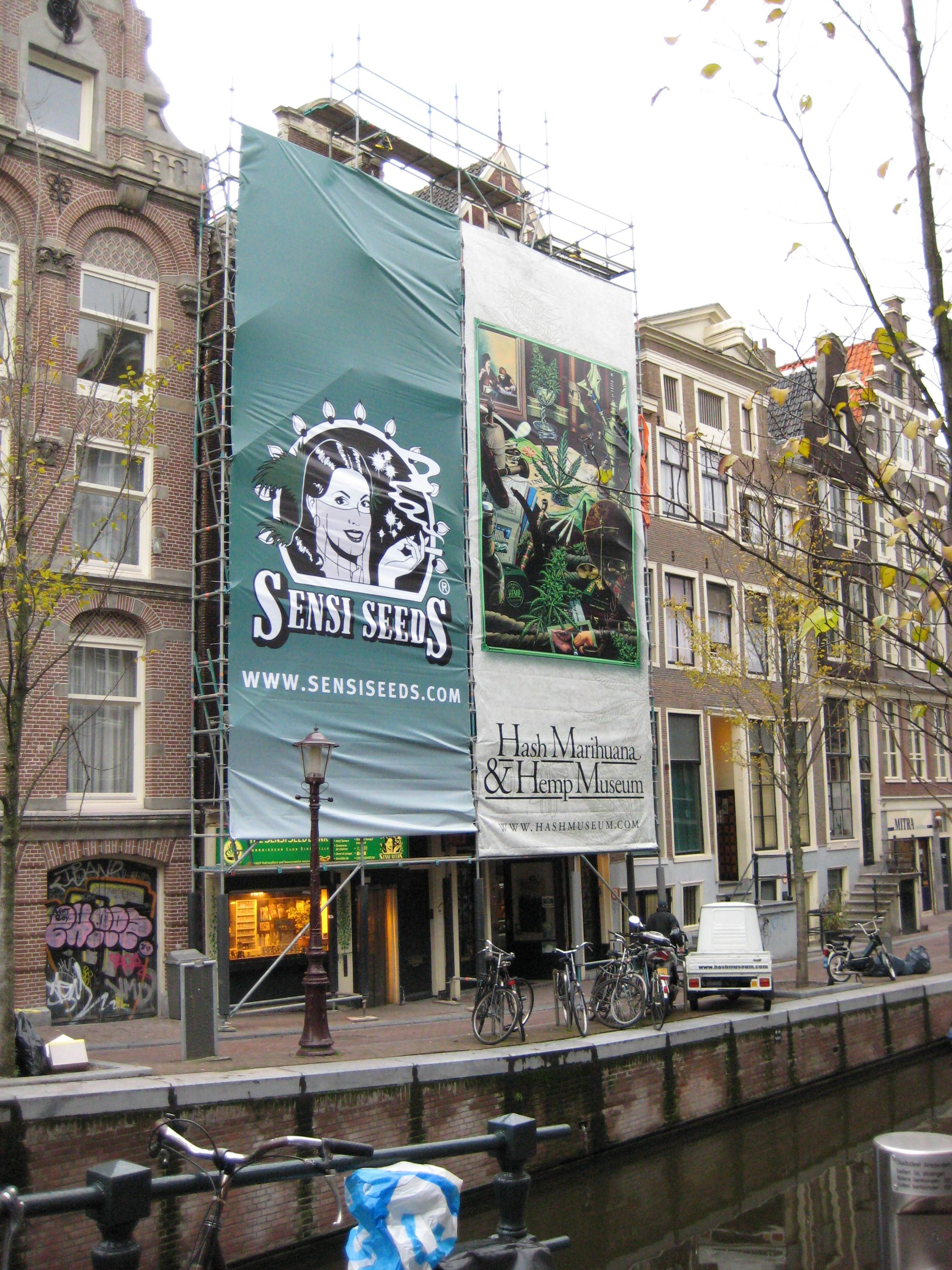
Cannabis Museum in Amsterdam

Cannabis leaf pictured in the coat of arms of Kanepi Parish

The cannabis plant has a history of medicinal use dating back thousands of years across many cultures. The Yanghai Tombs, a vast ancient cemetery (54 000 m^{2}) situated in the Turfan district of the Xinjiang Uyghur Autonomous Region in northwest China, have revealed the 2700-year-old grave of a shaman. He is thought to have belonged to the Jushi culture recorded in the area centuries later in the Hanshu, Chap 96B. Near the head and foot of the shaman was a large leather basket and wooden bowl filled with 789g of cannabis, superbly preserved by climatic and burial conditions. An international team demonstrated that this material contained THC. The cannabis was presumably employed by this culture as a medicinal or psychoactive agent, or an aid to divination. This is the oldest documentation of cannabis as a pharmacologically active agent. The earliest evidence of cannabis smoking has been found in the 2,500-year-old tombs of Jirzankal Cemetery in the Pamir Mountains in Western China, where cannabis residue were found in burners with charred pebbles possibly used during funeral rituals.

Settlements which date from c. 2200–1700 BCE in the Bactria and Margiana contained elaborate ritual structures with rooms containing everything needed for making drinks containing extracts from poppy (opium), hemp (cannabis), and ephedra (which contains ephedrine). Although there is no evidence of ephedra being used by steppe tribes, they engaged in cultic use of hemp. Cultic use ranged from Romania to the Yenisei River and had begun by 3rd millennium BC Smoking hemp has been found at Pazyryk.

Cannabis is first referred to in Hindu Vedas between 2000 and 1400 BCE, in the Atharvaveda. By the 10th century CE, it has been suggested that it was referred to by some in India as "food of the gods". Cannabis use eventually became a ritual part of the Hindu festival of Holi. One of the earliest to use this plant in medical purposes was Korakkar, one of the 18 Siddhas. The plant is called Korakkar Mooli in the Tamil language, meaning Korakkar's herb.

In Buddhism, cannabis is generally regarded as an intoxicant and may be a hindrance to development of meditation and clear awareness. In ancient Germanic culture, cannabis was associated with the Norse love goddess, Freya. An anointing oil mentioned in Exodus is, by some translators, said to contain cannabis.

In modern times, the Rastafari movement has embraced cannabis as a sacrament. Elders of the Ethiopian Zion Coptic Church, a religious movement founded in the U.S. in 1975 with no ties to either Ethiopia or the Coptic Church, consider cannabis to be the Eucharist, claiming it as an oral tradition from Ethiopia dating back to the time of Christ. Like the Rastafari, some modern Gnostic Christian sects have asserted that cannabis is the Tree of Life. Other organized religions founded in the 20th century that treat cannabis as a sacrament are the THC Ministry, Cantheism, the Cannabis Assembly and the Church of Cognizance.

Since the 13th century CE, cannabis has been used among Sufis – the mystical interpretation of Islam that exerts strong influence over local Muslim practices in Bangladesh, India, Indonesia, Turkey, and Pakistan. Cannabis preparations are frequently used at Sufi festivals in those countries. Pakistan's Shrine of Lal Shahbaz Qalandar in Sindh province is particularly renowned for the widespread use of cannabis at the shrine's celebrations, especially its annual Urs festival and Thursday evening dhamaal sessions – or meditative dancing sessions.

== See also ==
- Cannabis drug testing – Drug test methodologies for the use of cannabis
- Cannabis edible – Food item containing cannabis extract or cannabinoids
- Cannabis flower essential oil – Essential oil obtained from the hemp plant
- Hash, Marihuana & Hemp Museum – Museum in Amsterdam, Netherlands
- Igbo
- Indian Hemp Drugs Commission – Indo-British study on cannabis usage
- Legal history of cannabis in the United States
- Legality of cannabis by U.S. jurisdiction
- List of books about cannabis
- List of celebrities who own cannabis businesses
- Occupational health concerns of cannabis use – Overview of occupational health concerns over the use of cannabis among workers
