= Church of Cognizance =

The Church of Cognizance (COC) was founded in 1991 by Danuel & Mary Quaintance in Graham County (Pima) Arizona, United States.

== Beginnings ==
In 1994, the Quaintances recorded a 16-page "Declaration of Religious Sentiment" concretizing the establishment of their church. The COC Founders recording announced their intent to unite the world's ethnic minorities that utilize and rely upon the cannabis hemp plant as an ethno-socio-religious institution following Neo-Zoroastrian tenets.

While COC members are encouraged to study all of the world's religions, the Zoroastrian Avesta is held by them to be the least convoluted and most ancient source supporting their practices and beliefs. Numerous references to Haoma may be found in the Avesta.

In 2006, the COC with 40 to 50 members in Arizona, nationwide had 72 registered Individual Orthodox Member Monasteries (IOMMs), which are located inside members' homes.

== COC Membership ==
To become a "registered member" of the COC, a candidate must read a pamphlet titled "The Church Of Cognizance Introduced". The pamphlet includes the below stated beliefs, description of organization, and the membership pledge of the church. If the candidate is in agreement with the beliefs, organization, and pledge, they then must then fill out, and sign their pledge and return it to the designated address.

=== Beliefs ===
Members of the COC claim to believe:

1. That cannabis as Haoma, when raised and used properly, aids the mind, body, and soul.

2. That Haoma is the ancient teacher of wisdom, compassion, and the way to the kingdom of glory in heaven on earth, while humans let ego block their own, and others, path to this kingdom of glory.

3. That Haoma is the capable provider of all substance required to accommodate a comfortable, healthy, productive, full-bearing life.

4. That Haoma is the righteous protector of their health, and longevity; by way of receptors in the human body that they believe Haoma connects with to heal.

Based on their beliefs, they declare marijuana/cannabis/haoma to be "the teacher, the protector, the provider". And further, that the proper religious use promotes "Good Thoughts, Good Words, Good Deeds, none of which is harmful to the health, safety, welfare, or morals of society in general".

=== Organization ===
The COC is composed of "Family Oriented Monastic Orders" wherein members are dedicated to promoting the health, safety, welfare, culture, and tradition of the family thru their belief:

1. That the physically able, retired adults, of the family should care for the sick, the eldest, and the youngest of the family.

a. The eldest of the family whom have provided in the past should not be forgotten and tossed aside for strangers to care for.

b. The children of the family need to learn the family’s culture and traditions from a member of the family with that wisdom.

c. It allows the able bodied of the family to work and provide for the entire family without the worry of who's caring for their offspring, and whose customs and traditions they are taught.

d. It keeps family together, helping family, and the family as a whole may become Healthy, Wealthy, and Wise.

Each Family Oriented Monastic Order of the Church Of Cognizance is designated an "Individual Orthodox Member Monastery" (IOMM).

=== Members Pledge ===
By submitting their application, prospective members pledge their allegiance, and support, to the Church Of Cognizance and the IOMMs of which it is composed. Their pledge requires:

a. That they will do their best to live an honorable life; in a family oriented mode; as described in The Church Of Cognizance Belief’s Introduced.

b. That they will not allow any Marijuana raised for religious use to enter into commerce, nor will they provide marijuana to anyone outside of the Church Of Cognizance; other than in providing for the religious use by a potential member; and, that use must be under their direct supervision.

c. They agree that until such time as the governments end their war against the sacrament of the COC, they will keep any cultivation, or use, confined to a secluded, secure area, in order to mitigate government fears regarding child endangerment.

d. They understand that it is a duty of theirs to share the bounty of any harvest with the sick, and dying free of charge; when requested, if they are aware, or made aware, of it being beneficial in such situations.

e. And last, that they will respect other family’s lifestyles by agreeing not to introduce any minors into the marijuana religion.

== Founders' arrest, prosecution and sentencing ==
On February 22, 2006, the founders of the Church of Cognizance, Danuel and Mary Quaintance, were arrested with 172 pounds of marijuana. They asserted that the marijuana was for religious use, an argument which US District court judge Judith C. Herrera rejected outright. The federal judge stated that the evidence shows the two created the church and beliefs as a way of justifying their lifestyle choice to use marijuana and their belief that marijuana should be legalized. She further stated they cannot avoid prosecution for illegal conduct by simply calling their conduct a religion. Also it was noted that the monasteries were all located in members' homes. The church states a "declaration of religious sentiment" on behalf of the Church of Cognizance was filed with the Graham County Recorder's Office 12 years prior this arrest in 1994. Further noted was that the Quaintances had not faced any prior criminal charges related to their church and that they do not grow marijuana but pick it up from church "couriers", which is what they were doing when they were arrested. Both founders stepped down as leaders of the church following their arrests. But the couple hope to one day resume what they view as their worship.

On August 18, 2008, they both pleaded guilty to two counts. One count of conspiracy with intent to distribute 200 pounds or more of a mixture or substance containing a detectable amount of marijuana; and one count of possession with the intent to distribute 100 pounds or more of a substance containing a detectable amount of marijuana, as well as aiding and abetting. They faced up to 20 years in prison if convicted. Danuel Quaintance is serving a five-year sentence at a facility at the Federal Correctional Institute in Terminal Island, California, near Long Beach. Mary Quaintance is serving two years at the Victorville Federal Correctional Complex in Adelanto, Calif.

Although they both were confident that an appeal based on their claimed religious use would keep them out of prison, a unanimous three-judge panel of the 10th U.S. Circuit Court of Appeals on May 19, 2010, affirmed the denial of the couple’s RFRA defense in United States v. Quaintance. The panel agreed that evidence in the case established that the Quaintances had failed to establish that their beliefs about marijuana as a sacred substance were sincerely held, further concluding that “the record contains … overwhelming evidence that the Quaintances were running a commercial marijuana business with a religious front — particularly in this transaction aimed at securing bail money for Ms. Quaintance’s brother.”
