= Silver thiosulfate =

Identifiers
CAS Number	23149-52-2
3D model (JSmol)	Interactive image
ChEMBL	ChEMBL2251960
ChemSpider	8081126
ECHA InfoCard	100.041.311
EC Number	245-458-4
PubChem CID	9905473
CompTox Dashboard (EPA)	DTXSID501015534
- InChI: InChI=1S/2Ag.H2O3S2/c;;1-5(2,3)4/h;;(H2,1,2,3,4)/q2*+1;/p-2 Key: BLZGNFOLSIAOSQ-UHFFFAOYSA-L
- SMILES: [O-]S(=O)(=S)[O-].[Ag+].[Ag+]

Properties
Chemical formula	Ag_{2}O_{3}S_{2}
Molar mass	327.85 g·mol^{−1}

Hazards
- GHS labelling
Pictograms	(GHS07: Exclamation mark)
Signal word	Warning
Hazard statements	H315, H319, H335
Precautionary statements	P261, P264, P264+P265, P271, P280, P302+P352, P304+P340, P305+P351+P338, P319, P321, P332+P317, P337+P317, P362+P364, P403+P233, P405, P501
- Except where otherwise noted, data are given for materials in their standard state (at 25 °C [77 °F], 100 kPa). Infobox references

Silver thiosulfate (STS, chemical formula Ag_{2}S_{2}O_{3}) is an inorganic chemical that can promote early flower growth and promote flower duration in a variety of plants.

An aqueous solution of silver thiosulfate can be prepared by mixing solutions of sodium thiosulfate and silver nitrate. When used for plant assays, it is prepared using excess thiosulfate, giving the [Ag(S_{2}O_{3})_{2}]^{3–} complex ion.

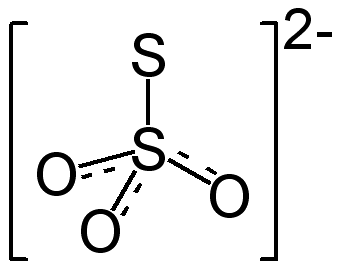
