= Cannabis strain =

Plant varieties of cannabis

Cannabis strains is a popular name to refer to plant varieties of the monospecific genus Cannabis sativa L.. They are either pure or hybrid varieties of the plant, which encompasses various sub-species C. sativa, C. indica, and C. ruderalis.

Varieties are developed to intensify specific characteristics of the plant, or to differentiate the strain for the purposes of marketing or to make it more effective as a drug. Variety names are typically chosen by their growers, and often reflect properties of the plant such as taste, color, smell, or the origin of the variety. The Cannabis strains referred to in this article are primarily those varieties with recreational and medicinal use. These varieties have been cultivated to contain a high percentage of cannabinoids. Several varieties of cannabis, known as hemp, have a very low cannabinoid content, and are instead grown for their fiber and seed. Due to the legal status of the plant in many jurisdictions, Cannabis plant varieties are at high risk of biopiracy.

== Major variety types ==
=== Taxonomic paradigm ===
The two species of the Cannabis genus that are most commonly grown are Cannabis indica and Cannabis sativa. A third species, Cannabis ruderalis, is very short and produces only trace amounts of tetrahydrocannabinol (THC), and thus is not commonly grown for industrial, recreational or medicinal use. However, because Cannabis ruderalis flowers independently of the photoperiod and according to age, it has been used to breed autoflowering strains.

Pure sativas are relatively tall (reaching as high as 4.5 meters), with long internodes and branches, and large, narrow-bladed leaves. Pure indica varieties are shorter and bushier, with wider leaflets. They are often favored by indoor growers for their size. Sativas bloom later than indicas, often taking a month or two longer to mature. The subjective effects of sativas and indicas are said to differ, but the ratio of tetrahydrocannabinol (THC) to cannabidiol (CBD) in most named drug varieties of both types is similar (averaging about 200:1). Unlike most commercially developed strains, indica landraces exhibit plants with varying THC/CBD ratios.

The informal designation sativa and indica may have various, controversial meanings. Morphologically, the name sativa designates tall plants with narrow leaves, while indica refers to short plants with wide leaves. Among the marijuana community however, sativa rather refers to equatorial varieties producing stimulating psychoactive effects, whereas indica-type plants from Central Asia are used for relaxing and sedative drugs.

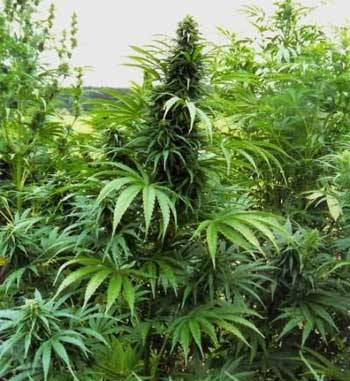
Cannabis indica

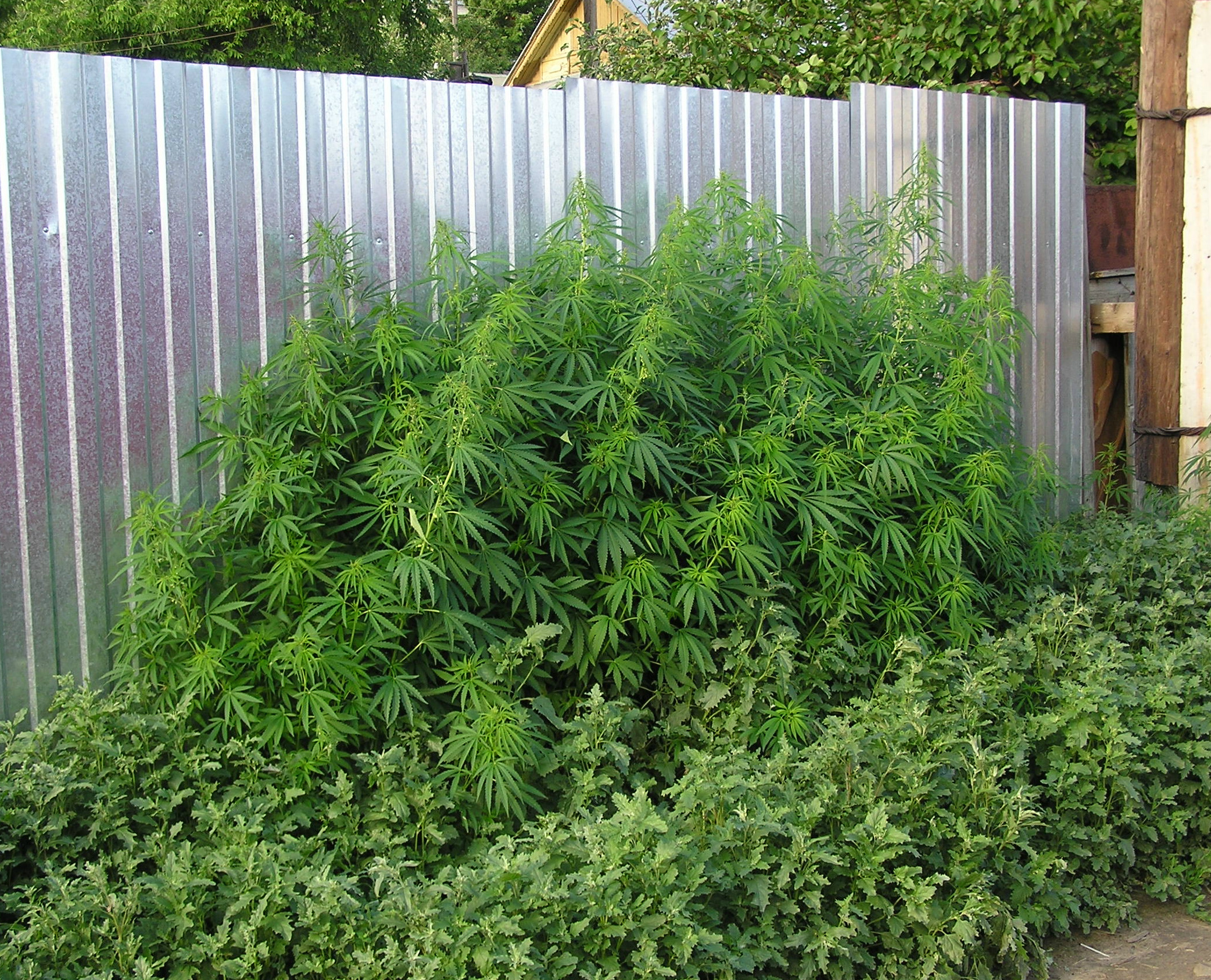
Cannabis ruderalis

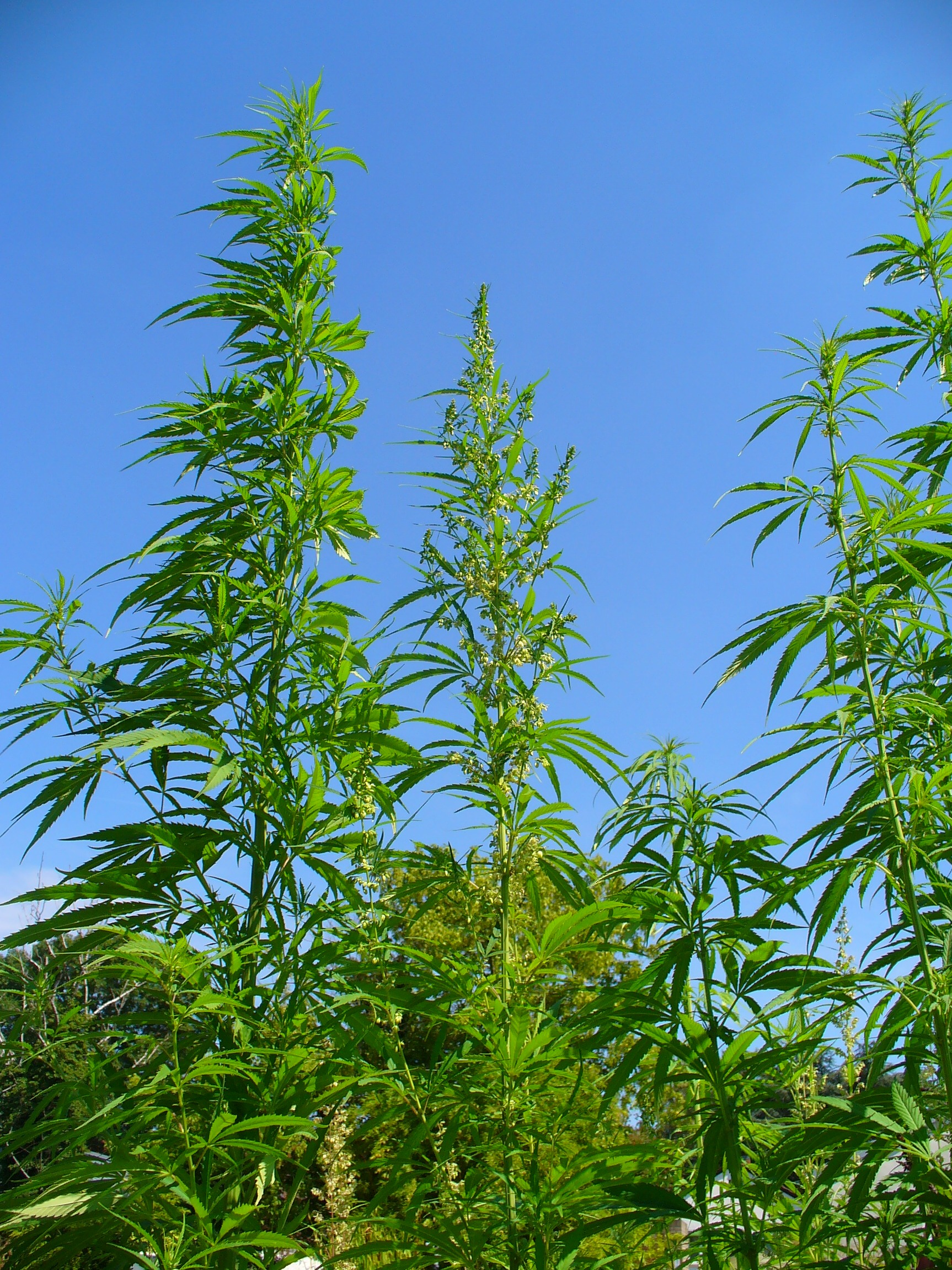
Cannabis sativa

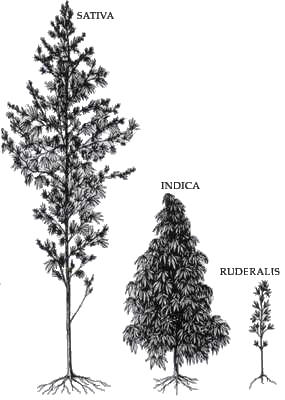
Relative size of cannabis types

=== Alternative classifications ===
There is an increasing discussion about whether the differences between species adequately represents the variability found within the genus Cannabis.

There are five chemotaxonomic types of cannabis: one with high levels of THC, one which is more fibrous and has higher levels of CBD, one that is an intermediate between the two, another one with high levels of cannabigerol (CBG), and the last one almost without cannabinoids.

There has also been a recent movement to characterize strains based on their reported subjective effects.

== Legality ==
Plant breeding is subject to a different set of rules and regulations, at times contradictory. The International Union for the Protection of New Varieties of Plants (UPOV Convention) grants limited proprietary rights to breeders over their seeds, under certain conditions. In parallel, and often in a conflicting way, a series of dispositions aiming to fight against biopiracy require breeders to prove that the free, prior and informed consent was obtained from the communities (often Indigenous peoples or peasant communities) from where the seeds used to breed the new variety originates. This is the case in particular of the Nagoya Protocol, a treaty complementing the Convention on Biological Diversity, in force since 2014 (2017 in the European Union).

In 2024, the GRATK Treaty was adopted, preventing national patent offices from granting patents based on biopiracy. Patent applicants relying on Cannabis strains will have to disclose the origin of the variety, which often entails compliance under the Nagoya protocol or other similar mechanisms of Access and Benefit Sharing Agreement.

== Breeding ==
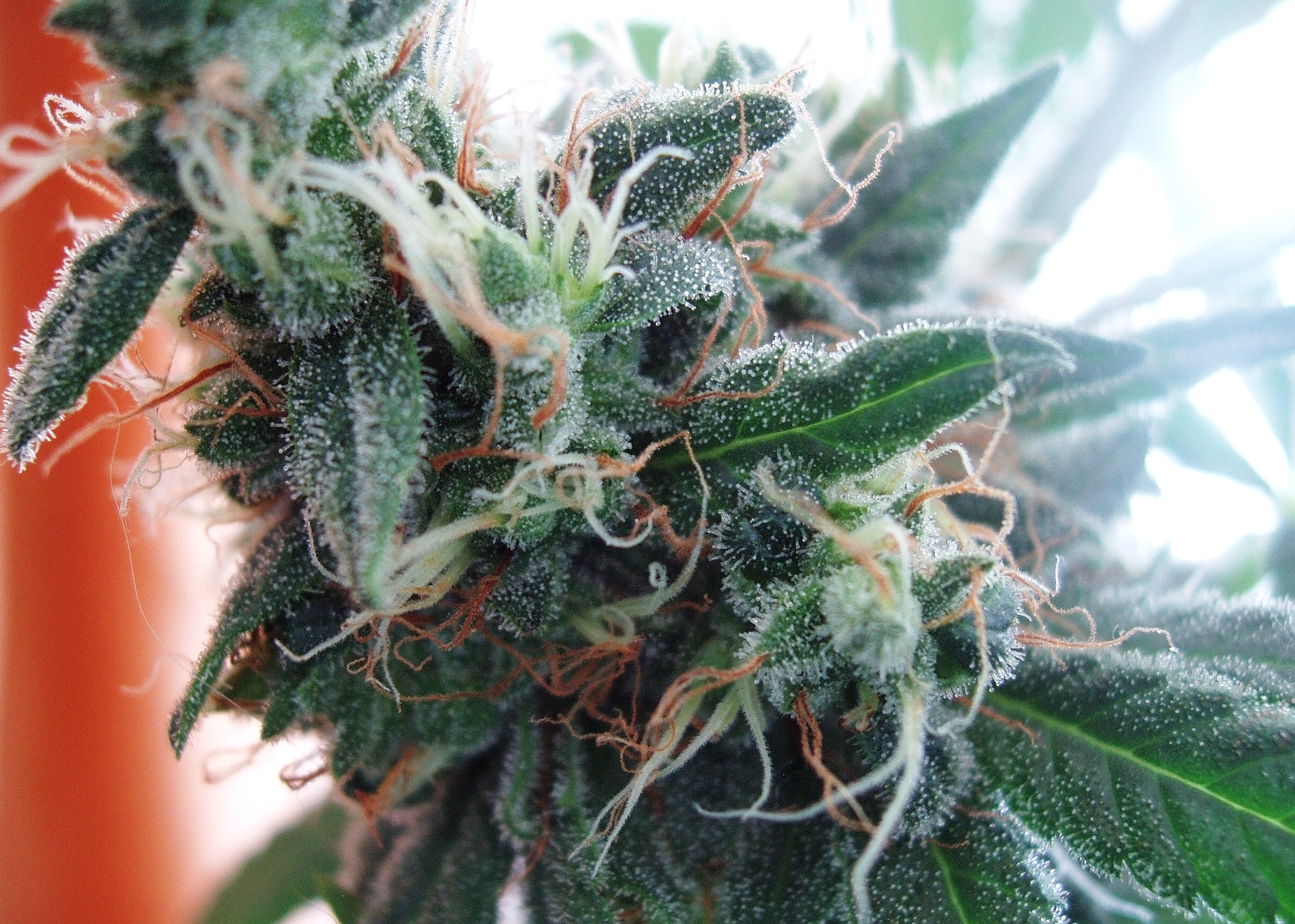
White Widow

In addition to pure indica, sativa, and ruderalis varieties, hybrid varieties with varying ratios of these three types are common, such as the White Widow hybrid which has about 60% indica and 40% sativa ancestry. These hybrid varieties exhibit traits from both parental types. There are also commercial crossbred hybrids which contain a mix of both ruderalis, indica or sativa genes, and are usually autoflowering varieties. "Lowryder" was an early auto-flowering hybrid that retained the flowering behavior of ruderalis plants, while also producing appreciable amounts of THC and CBD. Autoflowering cannabis varieties have the advantage of being discreet due to their small stature. They also require shorter growing periods, as well as having the additional advantage that they do not rely on a change in the photoperiod to determine when to flower.

Breeding requires pollinating a female cannabis plant with male pollen. Although this occurs spontaneously and ubiquitously in nature, the intentional creation of new varieties typically involves selective breeding in a controlled environment.

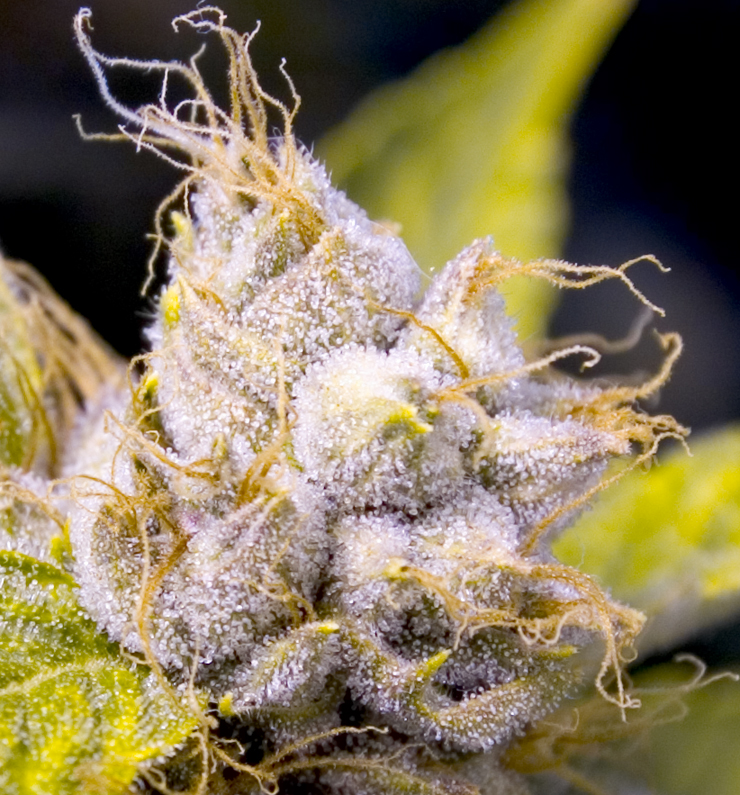
A flowering cannabis plant

When cannabis is cultivated for its psychoactive or medicinal properties, male plants will often be separated from females. This prevents fertilization of the female plants, either to facilitate sin semilla flowering or to provide more control over which male is chosen. Pollen produced by the male is caught and stored until it is needed.

When a male plant of one strain pollinates a female of another strain, the seeds will be F1 hybrids of the male and female. These offspring will not be identical to their parents. Instead, they will have characteristics of both parents. Repeated breeding results in certain characteristics appearing with greater regularity.

It is impossible for a hermaphrodite to create any male-only seeds. A hermaphrodite may create female only seeds and hermaphrodite seeds. Also the female-only seeds may carry the hermaphrodite trait.

Hybridization is the process of plants and animals breeding. Natural wind currents help speed up this hybridization process and promotes a positive growth. Some plants produce many seeds while some produce little to none depending on how it is bred. If seeds are produced traits from both the original parents will be expressed.

Techniques such as mutation breeding are used to develop new strains using irradiation or chemical mutagens such as colchicine. Various companies have been experimenting with creating new strains using genetic engineering techniques.

=== THC vis-à-vis CBD ===
During the selective breeding process for medical marijuana, THC:CBD ratios are accounted for and accommodated to the needs of the client's preference/illness. Due to the large genetic diversity and different geographical climates and environments, a wide range of strains and properties exist.

THC is associated with the psychoactive high, while CBD is not psychoactive and is purported to have medicinal properties. However, conversion of CBD to THC can occur when CBD is heated to temperatures between 250–300 °C, potentially leading to its partial transformation into THC.

=== Genetic stability ===
In order for there to be genetic stability within a marijuana strain the breeder has to go through selection and breeding, pinpointing the dominant and recessive genes within the two strains being crossed. After analyzing offspring with the preferred traits a breeder is looking for, the breeder will select the preferred traits and continue to breed those offspring to create the desired final product. Selection is a crucial process for a breeder to create a strain, especially if a client is looking for something with specific plant traits the breeder has to ensure that the hybrid's genetic traits have been closed in enough so unwanted traits aren't expressed in future harvests.

=== Varieties ===
In a retail market that is decriminalized such as in The Netherlands, where wholesale production is illegal but prosecutions are not always enforced because of the contradiction of the law that is recognised by the courts, competition puts pressure on breeders to create increasingly attractive varieties to maintain market share. Breeders give their strains distinct and memorable names in order to help differentiate them from their competitors' strains, although they may in fact be very similar.

==== Acapulco Gold ====
Acapulco Gold is a golden-leafed Cannabis sativa strain originally from the Acapulco area of southwest Mexico.

==== Bedrocan ====
Bedrocan is a medicinal cannabis variety cultivated from a Dutch medical marijuana Cannabis sativa L. strain, having a standardized content of THC (22%) and CBD (1%). It is currently cultivated by Bedrocan Nederland, Bedrocan Canada and Bedrocan Danmark. It was introduced in 2003 and, as of 2007, was only available with a prescription.

==== Blue Dream ====
Blue Dream is a hybrid cannabis strain widely used for both medical and recreational purposes, developed in 2003 through mixing Sativa and Indica strains named Blueberry and Haze. Believed to have originated in California, the plants will typically grow within 9-10 weeks, with moderate to high yields.

==== Charlotte's Web ====
Charlotte's Web is a high-cannabidiol (CBD), low-tetrahydrocannabinol (THC) cannabis variety and extract marketed as a dietary supplement under federal law of the United States. It is produced by the Stanley brothers in Colorado. It does not induce the psychoactive "high" typically associated with recreational marijuana strains that are high in THC. In September 2014, the Stanleys announced that they would ensure that the product consistently contained less than 0.3% THC. Charlotte's Web gained national attention when it was used to treat Charlotte Figi's epileptic seizures. Her story has led to her being described as "the girl who is changing medical marijuana laws across America," as well as the "most famous example of medicinal hemp use".

==== Skunk ====
Skunk refers to cannabis strains that are strong-smelling and have been likened to the smell of the spray from a skunk. These strains of cannabis are believed to have originated during the early 1980s in the United States prior to larger-scale development and popularization by Dutch growers. They are around five times more potent than traditional herbal cannabis. Just as with other strains of cannabis, skunk is commonly grown in controlled indoor environments under specialized grow lights, or in a greenhouse when full outdoor conditions are not suitable; skunk strains are hybrids of Cannabis sativa and Cannabis indica.

==== Sour Diesel ====
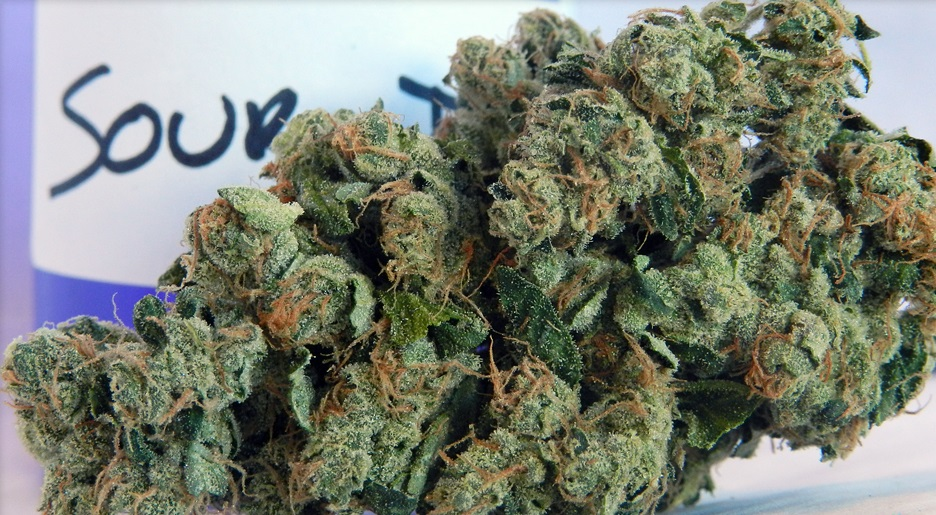
Sour Diesel

Sour Diesel is a hybrid strain of Cannabis sativa and Cannabis indica.

== See also ==
- Autoflowering cannabis
