= Afghanica =

Strain of cannabis

- Genus: Cannabis
- Hybrid parentage: C. indica × C. sativa
- Origin: Afghani #1 x Original Skunk

Afghanica (C. sativa subsp. indica 'Skunk 1' × C. sativa 'Afghani 1'), not to be confused with Afghan Kush, is a hybrid strain of cannabis. Its origination plants were Afghani #1 and so-called "Original" Skunk. Growing up to 1.83 m (6 ft.) tall, it is short and stocky with broad leaves a lush canopy, and dense buds as well. The plant matures over the summer and is ready for harvest in mid-autumn.

== Description ==
C. afghanica grows up to 1.83 (6 ft.) tall. The leaves are broad, short, and have well-defined veins in them; the leaflets and leaves are both dark green. The plants in maturity have white follicles of hair around them, giving the plant a very striking appearance. The branches are very dense with short internodes and long petioles.

== Flowering and Harvest ==
The flowering time of Afghanica is 56–63 days and the harvest time is in October. In cooler growing conditions, it may develop red and purple coloration on the leaves. Organic soil produces a sweeter end result, and the plant has a moderately low nutrient requirement. Afghanica is considered "normal" due to its production of both male and female plants.

=== Aroma, texture, and flavor ===
Afghanica plants, when mature will produce a petrol-like odor when their leaves are disturbed to any degree. Buds are dense and oily to the touch. Smaller, coated leaves produce heavy, oily resin. The plants are said to have a bitter, sharp, turbulent smell with a hint of sweetness.

== Taxonomy ==
Even though the exact date of the first production of this plant is unknown, the Flying Dutchmen breeders were the first to produce the strain. Skunk #1 and Afghani #1 were cross-bred, with the end result being Afghanica.
