= Penicillium copticola =

Scientific classification
- Kingdom: Fungi
- Division: Ascomycota
- Class: Eurotiomycetes
- Order: Eurotiales
- Family: Aspergillaceae
- Genus: Penicillium
- Species: P. copticola

Binomial name
- Penicillium copticola Houbraken, Frisvad & Samson 2011

Type strain
- CBS 127355, DTO 19H7, IBT 30771

Species of fungus

Penicillium copticola is a species of the genus of Penicillium which was isolated from the twigs, leaves, and apical and lateral buds of the plant Cannabis sativa L.

== See also ==
- List of Penicillium species
