= Charlotte's Web (cannabis) =

Strain of medical marijuana

- Charlotte's Web logo as found on their official website.
- Genus: Cannabis
- Species: Cannabis sativa
- Breeder: Stanley Brothers
- Origin: Colorado, United States

Charlotte's Web is a brand of high-cannabidiol (CBD), low-tetrahydrocannabinol (THC) products derived from industrial hemp and marketed as dietary supplements and cosmetics under federal law of the United States. It is produced by Charlotte's Web, Inc. in Colorado. Hemp-derived products do not induce the psychoactive "high" typically associated with recreational marijuana strains that are high in THC. Charlotte's Web hemp-derived products contain less than 0.3% THC.

Charlotte's Web is named after Charlotte Figi whose story had led to her being described as "the girl who is changing medical marijuana laws across America." Her parents and physicians say she experienced a reduction of her epileptic seizures brought on by Dravet syndrome after her first dose of medical marijuana at five years of age. Her usage of Charlotte's Web was first featured in the 2013 CNN documentary "Weed".

Media coverage increased demand for products high in CBD, which have been used to treat epilepsy in toddlers and children. One of the initial strains developed by the Stanley Brothers was originally called "Hippie's Disappointment" as it was a strain that had high CBD and could not induce a "high".

While initially anecdotal reports sparked interest in treatment with cannabinoids, there was not enough evidence to draw conclusions with certainty about their safety or efficacy. In 2018, Epidiolex (cannabidiol as the therapeutic ingredient) oral solution was approved by the FDA for two types of epilepsy.

== History ==
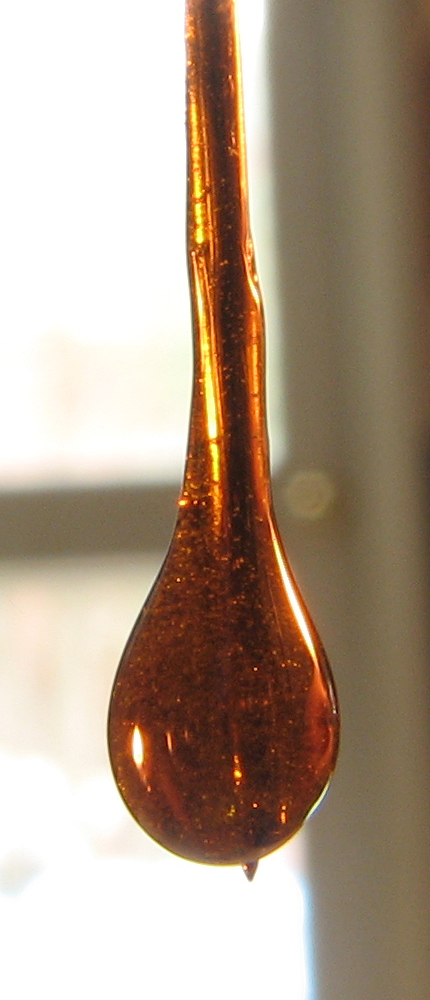
Cannabis oil

Charlotte's Web was a strain developed by the Stanley brothers (Joel, Jesse, Jon, Jordan, Jared and Josh) through crossbreeding a strain of marijuana with industrial hemp. This process created a variety with less tetrahydrocannabinol (THC) and more cannabidiol (CBD) than typical varieties of marijuana. The Stanley brothers grow the plants at their farm and greenhouses. A CBD rich oil is extracted from the harvested plants and concentrated through rotary evaporation. As it is so low in THC, the variety was originally called "Hippie's Disappointment". It is a less profitable plant with "close to no value to traditional marijuana consumers."

== Medical uses ==
=== Evidence ===
In 2014, there was little evidence about the safety or efficacy of cannabinoids in the treatment of epilepsy. A 2014 Cochrane review did not find enough evidence to draw conclusions about its use. A 2014 review by the American Academy of Neurology similarly concluded that "data are insufficient to support or refute the efficacy of cannabinoids for reducing seizure frequency."

The Cochrane review suggests cannabinoids be reserved for people with symptoms that are not controllable by other means, who have been evaluated by EEG-video monitoring to confirm diagnosis, and are not eligible for better-established treatments such as surgery and neurostimulation. A second review described four placebo-controlled trials of cannabidiol including 48 people with a disease that was not manageable by other means. Three out of four trials reported some reduction in seizures, but no comparison with placebo was possible due to the small number of people in the trials. The drugs were well tolerated. A third review found that no reliable conclusions about the effect of cannabis on epilepsy could be drawn due to the poor quality of available data, but further research may be warranted because of the good safety profile observed in small clinical trials.

=== Statements ===
Due to the anecdotal nature of the health claims being made, medical bodies have published statements of concern.

A 2014 position statement by the American Epilepsy Society stated:

The recent anecdotal reports of positive effects of the marijuana derivative cannabidiol for some individuals with treatment-resistant epilepsy give reason for hope. However, we must remember that these are only anecdotal reports, and robust scientific evidence for the use of marijuana is lacking... at present, the epilepsy community does not know if marijuana is a safe and effective treatment, nor do they know the long-term effects that marijuana will have on learning, memory, and behavior, especially in infants and young children.

Cannabis-derived products were not mentioned in the National Institute for Health and Care Excellence epilepsy treatment guidelines in 2012.

== Society and culture ==
=== Legal status ===
With the main ingredient being classified as "industrial hemp" in the United States, (Agriculture Improvement Act of 2018) Charlotte's Web Oil and other CBD products are legal in all 50 states, as long as the THC content is less than 0.3%.

The publicity associated with Charlotte's Web has inspired a number of legislative bills, some of which are in the planning stages, and others that have been proposed or actually passed. Children, as "uniquely powerful advocates for medicinal pot across the country," have inspired "the movement to legalize medicinal marijuana," a movement which "has a face like Charlotte's – and it's a young one that's hard to ignore. Lawmakers across the country are pushing legislation to legalize marijuana oil as a treatment for children with epilepsy."

On March 20, 2014, the Florida House of Representatives Budget Committee passed the "so-called Charlotte's Web measure (CS/HB 843)" designed to limit prosecutors' ability to prosecute those in possession of low THC/high CBD marijuana ("0.5 percent or less of tetrahydrocannabinol and more than 15 percent of cannabidiol") used for treating seizures. The law took effect July 1, 2014. Since then, Florida legislators have passed a bill with bipartisan support legalizing the use of Charlotte's Web, and Governor Rick Scott signed the "Compassionate Medical Cannabis Act of 2014" (SB 1030) into law on June 6, 2014. The law is also referred to as the "Charlotte's Web" law. The law specifies the number of distribution centers, which types of nurseries can grow the plants, requires various other controls, and provides funding for research.

- Federal legislation was introduced in 2014 (U.S. 113th Congress 2013–2014) but was never brought to a vote and died in committee.
- Rep. Perry, Scott (R-PA-4) introduced to the U.S. 114th Congress (2015–2016) H.R.1635 – Charlotte's Web Medical Access Act of 2015 with 62 bipartisan co-sponsors. It was referred to the House Committee on Energy and Commerce, the House Committee on the Judiciary, the Subcommittee on Health and the United States House Judiciary Subcommittee on Crime, Terrorism, Homeland Security and Investigations but was not brought to a vote.

On October 31, 2017, the FDA sent warning letters to four CBD marketers, including Stanley Brothers Social Enterprises, LLC (d/b/a CW Hemp), the producer of Charlotte's Web. They were warned "against making medical claims about cannabidiol (CBD). The agency also took issue with the businesses marketing CBD products as dietary supplements".

=== Etymology ===
Charlotte's Web is named after an American girl, Charlotte Figi, who developed Dravet syndrome (also known as severe myoclonic epilepsy of infancy or SMEI) as a baby. By age three, Figi was severely disabled and having 300 grand mal seizures a week despite treatment. Her parents learned about another child with Dravet Syndrome, who had been using a different type of medical marijuana since June 2011, and decided to try marijuana. Her parents and physicians said that she improved immediately. She followed a regular regimen that used a solution of the high-CBD marijuana extract in olive oil. She was given the oil under her tongue or in her food. Her parents said in 2013 that her epilepsy had improved so that she had only about four seizures per month, and she was able to engage in normal childhood activities.

The type now named after Figi was not the first type her parents tried. As their original supply, a type called R4 that is also high in CBD and low in THC, was running out, they contacted the Stanley brothers. From the Stanleys' stock, they chose the high-CBD variety that has since been renamed to Charlotte's Web.

Charlotte's story has been featured on two CNN documentaries, The Doctors TV show, 60 Minutes Australia, and Dateline NBC, among many other sources. An article in the National Journal detailing the role of several children as "uniquely powerful advocates for medicinal pot across the country" described Charlotte as the "first poster child for the issue...." Her story has led to her being described as "the girl who is changing medical marijuana laws across America," as well as the "most famous example of medicinal hemp use". On November 13, 2019, Charlotte was the first child featured on the cover of High Times magazine in her "Namesake" role as a "High Times Female 50" award nominee. Charlotte Figi died on April 7, 2020.

=== Publicity and demand ===
When Charlotte was five years old, her story was featured in the August 11, 2013, CNN documentary "Weed", hosted by Sanjay Gupta. On November 24, 2013, Paige Figi was a guest on The Doctors TV show, where Charlotte's story was told. She was also featured in Gupta's March 11, 2014, CNN documentary "Weed 2: Cannabis Madness". The extract received more publicity on October 6, 2014, when The Doctors TV show again featured a story about usage of Charlotte's Web. The physicians called for a change of the Federal classification. Sanjay Gupta has also expressed his support for Charlotte's Web on The Doctors TV show. On the October 17, 2014, episode of the ABC TV series The View, Paige Figi and Joel Stanley were interviewed by Whoopi Goldberg and Nicolle Wallace.

The CNN documentaries received widespread publicity and popularized Charlotte's Web as a possible treatment for epilepsy and other conditions. Colorado has legalized both the medicinal and recreational use of marijuana, and many parents have flocked there with their suffering children in search of Charlotte's Web and other forms of medical marijuana. In November 2013, CBS Denver reported that "[t]here is now a growing community of 93 families with epileptic children using marijuana daily. Hundreds are on a waiting list and thousands are calling." In October 2014, Time noted the Stanley brothers had a waiting list of "more than 12,000 families." They have been termed "marijuana refugees", "part of a migration of families uprooting their lives and moving to Colorado, where the medicinal use of marijuana is permitted...forced to flee states where cannabis is off limits." In November 2014, David Nutt mentioned Charlotte's Web in the Royal Pharmaceutical Society's Pharmaceutical Journal, where he appealed for the UK government to act "on evidence, allowing the use of medicinal cannabis and reducing barriers to its research".

Families who say they have run out of pharmaceutical options have moved to Colorado to access Charlotte's Web. The demand has spurred calls for more research to determine whether these products actually do what is claimed. Amy Brooks-Kayal, vice president of the American Epilepsy Society, stated that epileptic seizures may come and go without any obvious explanation, and that Charlotte's web could cause developmental harm. She recommended that parents relocate so that their affected children could have access to one of the nation's top pediatric epilepsy centers rather than move to Colorado.

The product has been described as the "country's most famous brand of CBD oil", the "largest selling CBD oil in the country", and the "number one brand", with 7% of the market.

In October 2022, Charlotte's Web became the official CBD supplier for Major League Baseball with a multi-year contract.

=== Distribution ===
In November 2013, Josh Stanley said that Charlotte's web was 0.5% THC and 17% CBD, and that it "is as legal as other hemp products already sold in stores across Utah, including other oils, clothing, and hand creams, but is illegal, federally, to take across state lines." The legalities of selling the product to people who transport it across state lines are complicated, with difficulties for both the sellers and transporters.
