= Autoflowering cannabis =

Form of cannabis cultivation

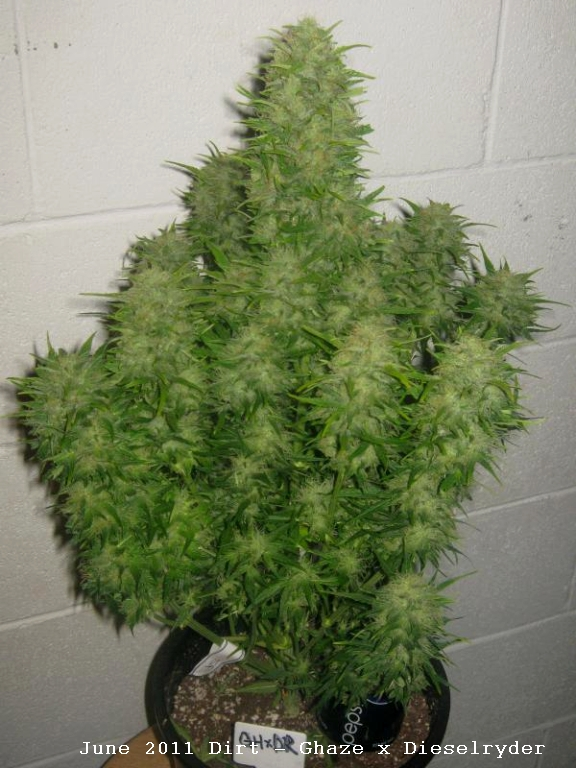
GHaze x Dieselryder autoflower

Autoflowering cannabis or day neutral cannabis varieties automatically switch from vegetative growth to the flowering stage based on age, as opposed to the ratio of light to dark hours required with photoperiod dependent/short-day strains. Many autoflowering varieties are ready to harvest in less than 10 weeks from seed. Dwarf varieties can have short stature while still giving decent harvests.

== Origins ==
The origins of autoflowering cannabis are still debatable. The strain Lowryder, by breeder The Joint Doctor, was the original large scale marketed autoflower and was first sold in 2003. Lowryder contains genetics from a Mexican strain that was referred to as Mexican Rudy and is believed to be created from a cross between a Mexican sativa and a Russian Cannabis ruderalis. Another theory is that the early genetics came from the first oilseed hemp variety called Finola, which was developed from Russian stock in Finland during 1995. These early hybrids with large amounts of C. ruderalis genes were lacking some of the finer qualities of high grade cannabis strains available.

The ruderalis subspecies of cannabis is highly resilient. Native to the harsh climates of Russia, central Europe, and central Asia, ruderalis was officially identified in the wild regions of South Siberia by Janischewski, a Russian botanist, back in 1924.

Further hybrids from these ruderalis dominant strains were created using some of the more popular and standard photo-period sensitive strains. Since the first mass market autoflower, Lowryder, many improvements have been made by breeders. Because the effect was weak when consuming it due to its low THC levels, autoflowers weren't popular among recreational users. Since these early days of autoflower genetics the breeding has produced seeds that will flower for 45 days after a 2-to-3-week vegetation stage resulting in harvests as quick as 63 days.

A couple of years after its characteristics became known, autoflowering strains became of high interest to cannabis breeders. Breeders started developing ruderalis hybrids that had high THC or CBD levels and only needed around 9 weeks to completely mature. These hybrids became known as autoflowering cannabis, for its ability to flower automatically without depending on darkness, like normal photoperiodic strains.

== Characteristics ==
Cannabis ruderalis has naturally low concentrations of THC. With hybrid breeding, autoflowering plants can contain levels of THC similar to the strain they're bred with.

Breeders have reported THC content around 25% in some newer varieties while many varieties also have high CBD content.

Some advantages of autoflower plants include:

- Short time to harvest, usually going from seed to harvest in under 13 weeks (some as short as seven weeks)
- Can be kept short in stature for "stealth" growing
- The Cannabis ruderalis heritage causes flowering after 2–3 weeks from germination
- No need for a separate vegetative and flowering environment (unlike with photoperiod dependent/ short-day strains)
- Due to short life span can be grown in cold climates where summers are short and cold
- Can produce multiple harvests outdoors in one season
- Can be grown in areas of high light pollution without preventing flowering or causing hermaphroditism
- 45 day autoflowering strains have been developed

Most autoflowering seeds available in the market are feminised. Only a few brands offer regular autoflowering seeds.

== Breeding ==
Creating true autoflowering seed from two quality, true breeding autoflowering parent plants is easy for most. Breeding new autoflowering strains becomes more difficult when attempting to make a hybrid with a non-autoflowering strain. Some photoperiod/short-day cannabis strains are heterogeneous - containing the recessive day-neutral or autoflowering genetics along with the dominant short-day genetics. However a proper list of such strains is not yet available so most breeders treat all short-day plants as homozygous dominant.

A true autoflower is homozygous recessive for the day neutral genetics. Therefore, most crosses between classical photoperiod/short-day strains and autoflowers produce few or no autoflower progeny in the F1 generation. Regardless of whether the F1 generation produces autoflowering plants, the higher performing and similar plants need to be recrossed. This F2 generation will contain approximately 25% of homozygous recessive plants which are autoflowering. Still the few autoflowers produced are not always stable and may require further stabilization. Further complexities with stabilizing autoflowers has previously led to non-autoflowering and low quality strains making it into the market.

== See also ==
- Cannabis cultivation

Top 33 Autoflower Strains as of 2026 https://www.piffinten.com/p/autoflower.html

== Notes ==
- Cannabis, Sir Ross (2015). Cannabis Botany and Marijuana Horticulture Naturally Medicinal. Maison Hydroponique Publishing. ISBN 978-1548501594. Archived from the original on 2017-08-07.
