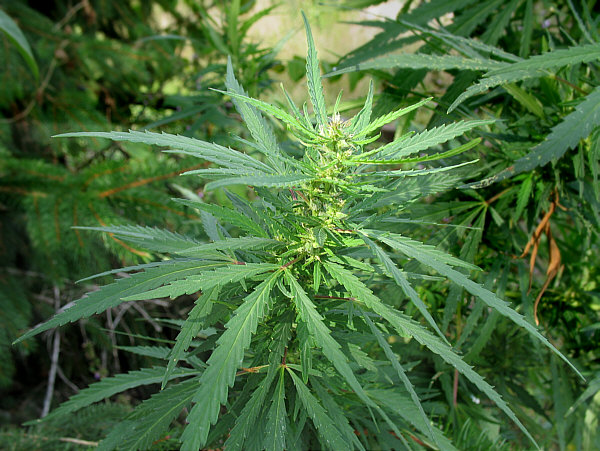
- Specimen in Brandenburg, Germany

Scientific classification
- Kingdom: Plantae
- Clade: Embryophytes
- Clade: Tracheophytes
- Clade: Angiosperms
- Clade: Eudicots
- Clade: Rosids
- Order: Rosales
- Family: Cannabaceae
- Genus: Cannabis
- Species: C. ruderalis

Binomial name
- Cannabis ruderalis Janisch.

Synonyms
- Cannabis sativa var. spontanea; Cannabis sativa var. ruderalis

= Cannabis ruderalis =

Species of plant

Cannabis ruderalis is a variety, subspecies, or species of Cannabis native to Central and Eastern Europe and Russia. It contains a relatively low quantity of the psychoactive compound tetrahydrocannabinol (THC) and does not require a photoperiod to blossom (unlike C. indica and C. sativa). Some scholars accept C. ruderalis as its own species due to its unique traits and phenotypes which distinguish it from C. indica and C. sativa; others debate whether ruderalis is a subspecies under C. sativa.

== Description ==
This species is smaller than other species of the genus, rarely growing over 0.61 metres (2 feet) in height. The plants have "thin, slightly fibrous stems" with little branching. The foliage is typically open with large leaves. C. ruderalis reaches maturity much quicker than other species of Cannabis, typically 5–7 weeks after being planted from seed.

Unlike other species of the genus, C. ruderalis enters the flowering stage based on the plant's maturity rather than its light cycle. With C. sativa and C. indica varieties, the plant stays in the vegetative state indefinitely as long as a long daylight cycle is maintained. Cannabis geneticists today refer to this feature as "autoflowering" when C. ruderalis is cross-bred.

Regarding its cannabinoid profile, it usually contains less tetrahydrocannabinol (THC) in its resin compared to other Cannabis species but is often high in cannabidiol (CBD).

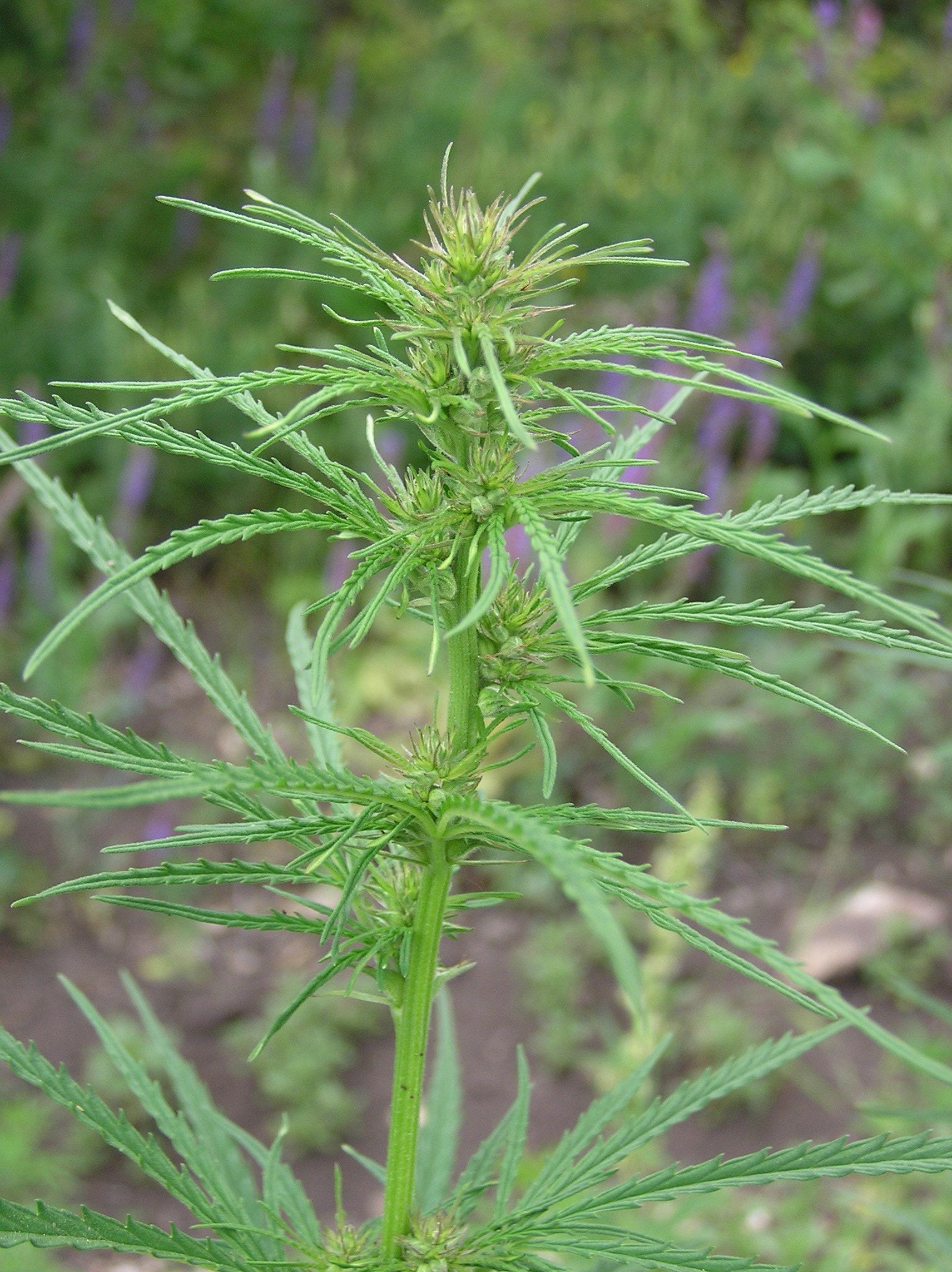
Wild female specimen, Russia

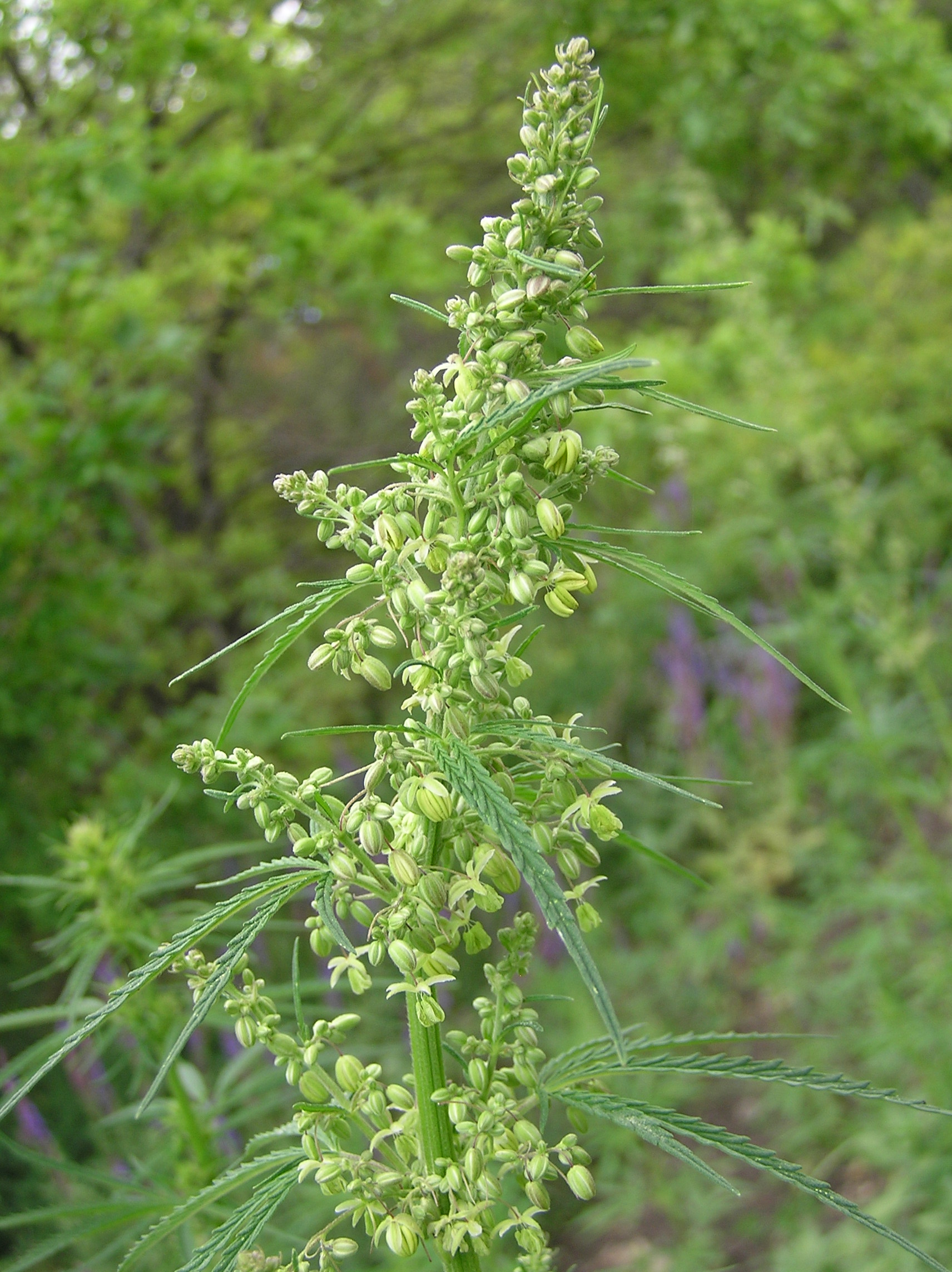
Wild male specimen, Russia

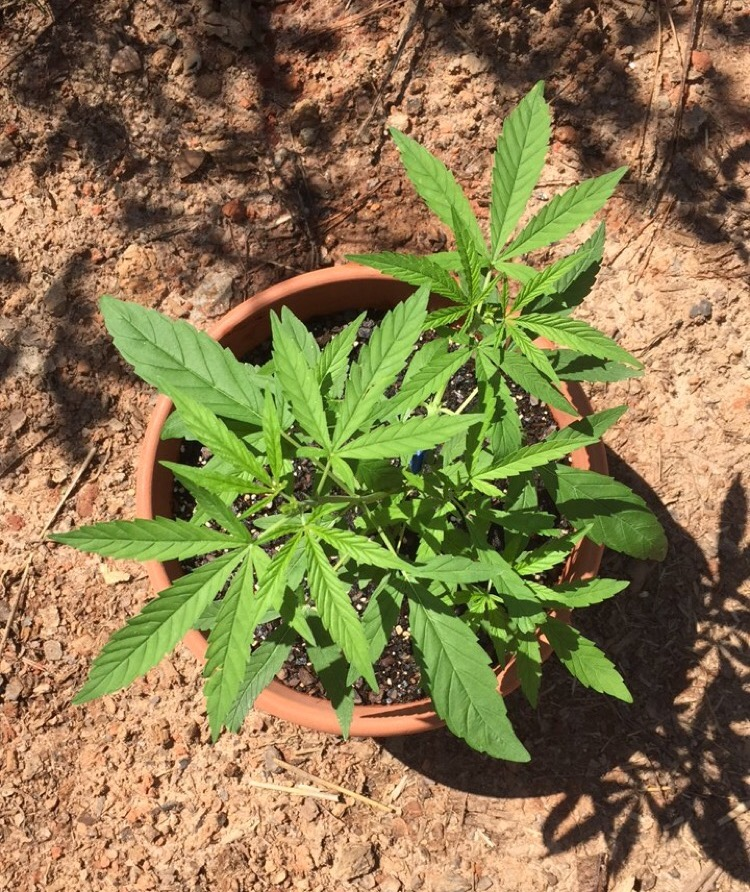
Leaves from above

== Taxonomy ==
=== Species description ===
There is no consensus in the botany community that C. ruderalis is one separate species, rather than a subspecies from C. sativa. It was first described in 1924 by D. E. Janischewsky, noting the visible differences in the fruits' seed (an achene), shape and size from previously classified Cannabis sativa.

=== Genomic studies ===
Recently, genomic DNA studies utilizing molecular markers and different varieties of plants from diverse geographical origins have been employed to enrich the Cannabis taxonomy discussion. In 2005, Hillig reinforced the polytypic classification system based on allozyme variation at 17 genomic loci. Hillig's approach, proposed a more detailed taxonomy encompassing three species with seven subspecies or varieties:

- C. sativa
  - C. sativa subsp. sativa var. sativa
  - C. sativa subsp. sativa var. spontanea
  - C. sativa subsp. indica var. kafiristanica
- C. indica
  - C. indica
  - C. indica sensu
- C. chinensis
- C. ruderalis.

Clarke and Merlin carried out more studies in 2013 to analyze the genus mixing molecular markers, chemotypes and morphological characteristics. They proposed a refinement in Hillig's hypothesis and suggested that C. ruderalis could be the wild ancestor of C. sativa and C. indica. However, these affirmations were based on a limited sample size.

=== Etymology ===
The term ruderalis is derived from the Latin rūdera, which is the plural form of rūdus, meaning "rubble", "lump", or "rough piece of bronze". In botanical Latin, ruderalis means "weedy" or "growing among waste". A ruderal species refers to any plant that is the first to colonize land after a disturbance removing competition.

== Distribution and habitat ==
C. ruderalis was first scientifically described in 1924 (from plants collected in southern Siberia), although it grows wild in other areas of Russia. The Russian botanist, Janischewski, was studying wild Cannabis in the Volga River system and realized he had come upon a third species. C. ruderalis is a hardier variety grown in the northern Himalayas and southern states of the former Soviet Union, characterized by a more sparse, "weedy" growth.

Similar C. ruderalis populations can be found in most of the areas where hemp cultivation was once prevalent. The most notable region in North America is the Midwestern United States, though populations occur sporadically throughout the United States and Canada. Large wild C. ruderalis populations are found in central and eastern Europe, most of them in Ukraine, Lithuania, Belarus, Latvia, Estonia and adjacent countries. Without human selection, these plants have lost many of the traits they were originally selected for, and have acclimated to their environment.

== Cultivation ==
Seeds of C. ruderalis were brought to Amsterdam in the early 1980s in order to enhance the breeding program of seed banks.

C. ruderalis has lower THC content than either C. sativa or C. indica, so it is rarely grown for recreational use. Also, the shorter stature of C. ruderalis limits its application for hemp production. C. ruderalis strains are high in the cannabinoid cannabidiol (CBD), so they are grown by some medical marijuana users.

Because C. ruderalis transitions from the vegetative stage to the flowering stage with age, as opposed to the light cycle required with photoperiod strains, it is bred with other household sativa and indica strains of cannabis to create "auto-flowering cannabis strains". This trait offers breeders some agricultural possibilities and advantages over the photoperiodic flowering varieties, as well as resistance aspects to insect and disease pressures.

C. indica strains are frequently cross-bred with C. ruderalis to produce autoflowering plants with high THC content, improved hardiness and reduced height. Cannabis x intersita Sojak, a strain identified in 1960, is a cross between C. sativa and C. ruderalis. Attempts to produce a Cannabis strain with a shorter growing season are another application of cultivating C. ruderalis. C. ruderalis when crossed with sativa and indica strains will carry the recessive autoflowering trait. Further crosses will stabilise this trait and give a plant which flowers automatically and can be fully mature in as little as 10 weeks.

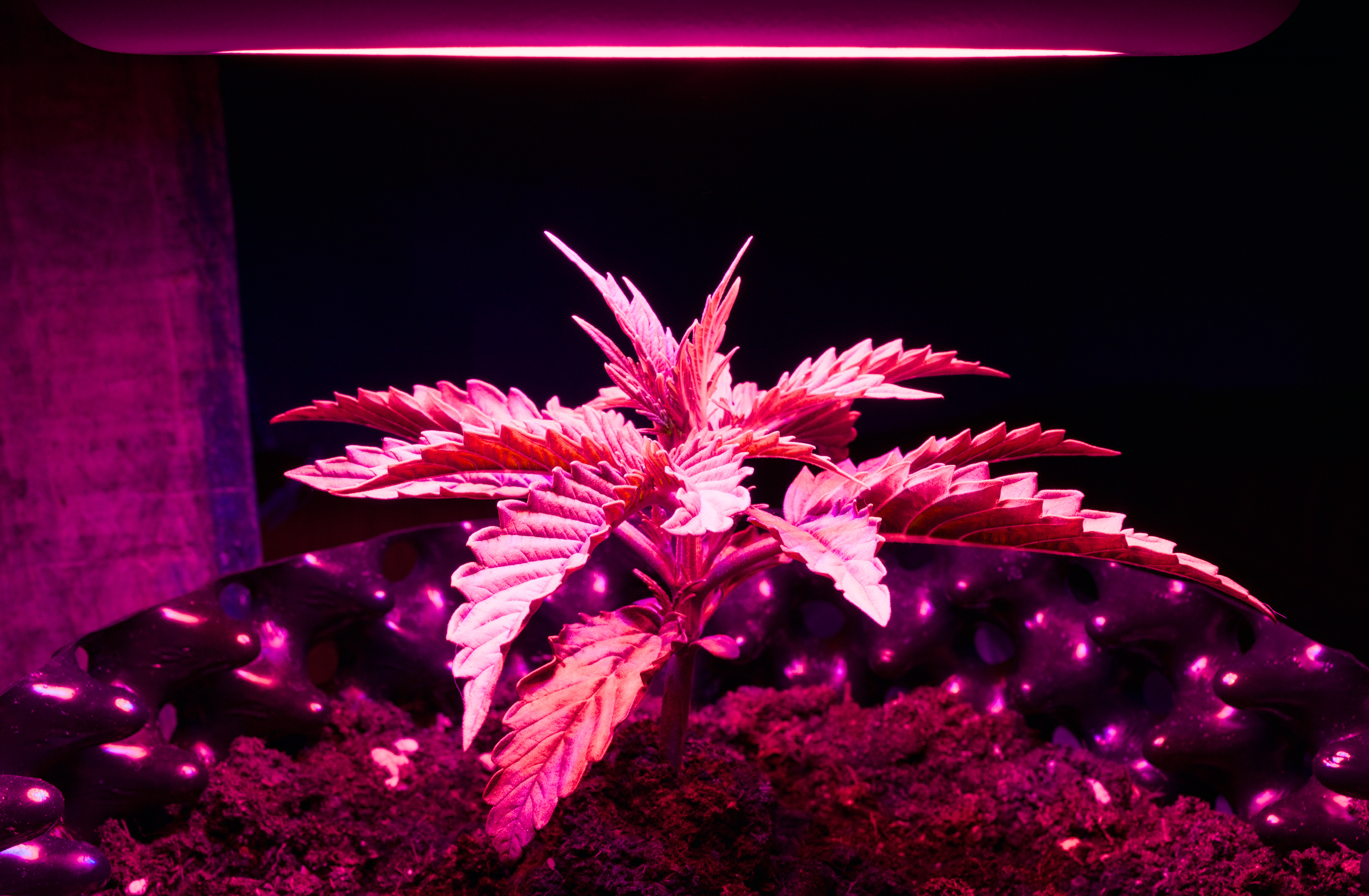
Plant growing indoors under LED lights

Cultivators also favor ruderalis plants due to their reduced production time, typically finishing in 3–4 months rather than 6–8 months. The auto-flowering trait is extremely beneficial because it allows for multiple harvests in one outdoor growing season without the use of light deprivation techniques necessary for multiple harvests of photoperiod-dependent strains.

== Uses ==
C. ruderalis is traditionally used in Russian and Mongolian folk medicine, especially for uses in treating depression. Because C. ruderalis is among the lowest THC producing biotypes of Cannabis, C. ruderalis is rarely used for recreational purposes.

In modern use, C. ruderalis has been crossed with Bedrocan strains to produce the strain Bediol for patients with medical prescriptions. The typically higher concentration of CBD may make ruderalis plants viable for the treatment of anxiety or epilepsy.

== Bibliography ==
=== Books ===
- Booth, Martin (2005). Cannabis: A History. Picador. pp. 2–3. ISBN 9781250082190.
- Cervantes, Jorge (2006). Marijuana Horticulture: The Indoor/Outdoor Medical Grower's Bible (5th ed.). Van Patten Publishing. pp. 12. ISBN 9781878823236.
- Clarke, Robert Connell (1981). Marijuana Botany: An Advanced Study. Berkeley, California: Ronin Publishing, Inc. pp. 115, 157. ISBN 9780914171782.
- Clarke, Robert Connell; Merlin, Mark David (2013). Cannabis: evolution and ethnobotany. Berkeley: University of California Press. ISBN 978-0-520-27048-0.
- Green, Greg (2005). The Cannabis Breeder's Bible: The Definitive Guide to Marijuana Genetics, Cannabis Botany and Creating Strains for the Seed Market. Green Candy Press. p. 14. ISBN 978-1931160278.
- Ratsch, Christian (1998). Marijuana Medicine: A World Tour of the Healing and Visionary Powers of Cannabis. Translated by John Baker. Switzerland: AT Verlag Aarau. pp. 59–60. ISBN 9780892819331.
- Stafford, Peter (1992). Psychedelics Encyclopedia. Berkeley, California: Ronin Publishing, Inc. p. 159. ISBN 9781579511692.
- Stearn, William (2004). Botanical Latin. Timber Press. p. 485. ISBN 9780881926279.

=== Articles ===
- Basile, Giuseppe N.; Tedone, Luigi; Pulvento, Cataldo; De Mastro, Giuseppe; Ruta, Claudia (2023). "Establishment of an Efficient In Vitro Propagation Protocol for Cannabis sativa L. subsp. ruderalis Janish". Horticulturae. 9 (11): 1241. doi:10.3390/horticulturae9111241. hdl:11586/456687. ISSN 2311-7524.
- Hillig, Karl W.; Mahlberg, Paul G. (2004-06-01). "A chemotaxonomic analysis of cannabinoid variation in Cannabis (Cannabaceae)". American Journal of Botany. 91 (6): 966–975. Bibcode:2004AmJB...91..966H. doi:10.3732/ajb.91.6.966. ISSN 0002-9122. PMID 21653452.
- Hillig, Karl W. (2005-03-01). "Genetic evidence for speciation in Cannabis (Cannabaceae)". Genetic Resources and Crop Evolution. 52 (2): 161–180. Bibcode:2005GRCEv..52..161H. doi:10.1007/s10722-003-4452-y. ISSN 1573-5109.
- Lapierre, Éliana; Monthony, Adrian S.; Torkamaneh, Davoud (2023-08-01). "Genomics-based taxonomy to clarify cannabis classification". Genome. 66 (8): 202–211. doi:10.1139/gen-2023-0005. hdl:1807/127752. ISSN 0831-2796. PMID 37163765.
- Schultes, Richard Evans; Klein, William M.; Plowman, Timothy; Lockwood, Tom E. (1974-02-28). "Cannabis: an Example of Taxonomic Neglect". Botanical Museum Leaflets, Harvard University. 23 (9): 337––367. doi:10.5962/p.168565.
