= Charlotte Figi =

American medical cannabidiol patient (2006–2020)

- Born: October 18, 2006
- Died: April 7, 2020 (aged 13); Colorado Springs, Colorado, U.S.
- Cause of death: Respiratory failure and cardiac arrest following epileptic seizure
- Known for: Charlotte's Web strain of cannabis is named after her

Charlotte Figi (October 18, 2006 – April 7, 2020) was an American girl with Dravet syndrome, who took cannabidiol (CBD) oil to prevent seizures, and inspired the name of the medical cannabis strain Charlotte's Web.

== Life ==
Figi was born on October 18, 2006, with a twin sister, to parents Paige and Matt Figi. At 3 months old, she had her first seizure. Due to her Dravet syndrome, at age five, she used a wheelchair, had up to 300 grand mal seizures a week, and had trouble speaking.

In 2012, Figi's mother searched for CBD marijuana oil for her daughter's treatment. Figi began taking oil from the marijuana strain, "Hippie's Disappointment," which contained low THC, and was later renamed Charlotte's Web. With the use of Charlotte's Web, Figi experienced an immediate reduction in her epileptic seizures, down from 300 a week to two or three per month. While the use of medical marijuana was still illegal in many states, news of Figi's success spread and families with similar diagnoses started moving to Colorado Springs, where the drug was originally sold. Because of her story, she also gained worldwide notice and media attention. In 2013, she was the subject of the CNN documentary Weed by Sanjay Gupta. She became a well-known figure in the U.S. and international medical marijuana movement and her story helped support U.S. legislation on medical marijuana. In 2019, Figi was the first child featured on a cover of High Times.

In April 2020, Figi was hospitalized with pneumonia, which then caused seizures, respiratory failure, and cardiac arrest. She died on April 7, 2020, at the age of 13. According to her mother, Figi was admitted to the hospital and tested negative for COVID-19 on April 3 and was "treated as a likely COVID-19 case" when later readmitted to the hospital.

== Legacy ==
Colorado Governor Jared Polis proclaimed April 7 "Charlotte Figi Day" in Colorado.
