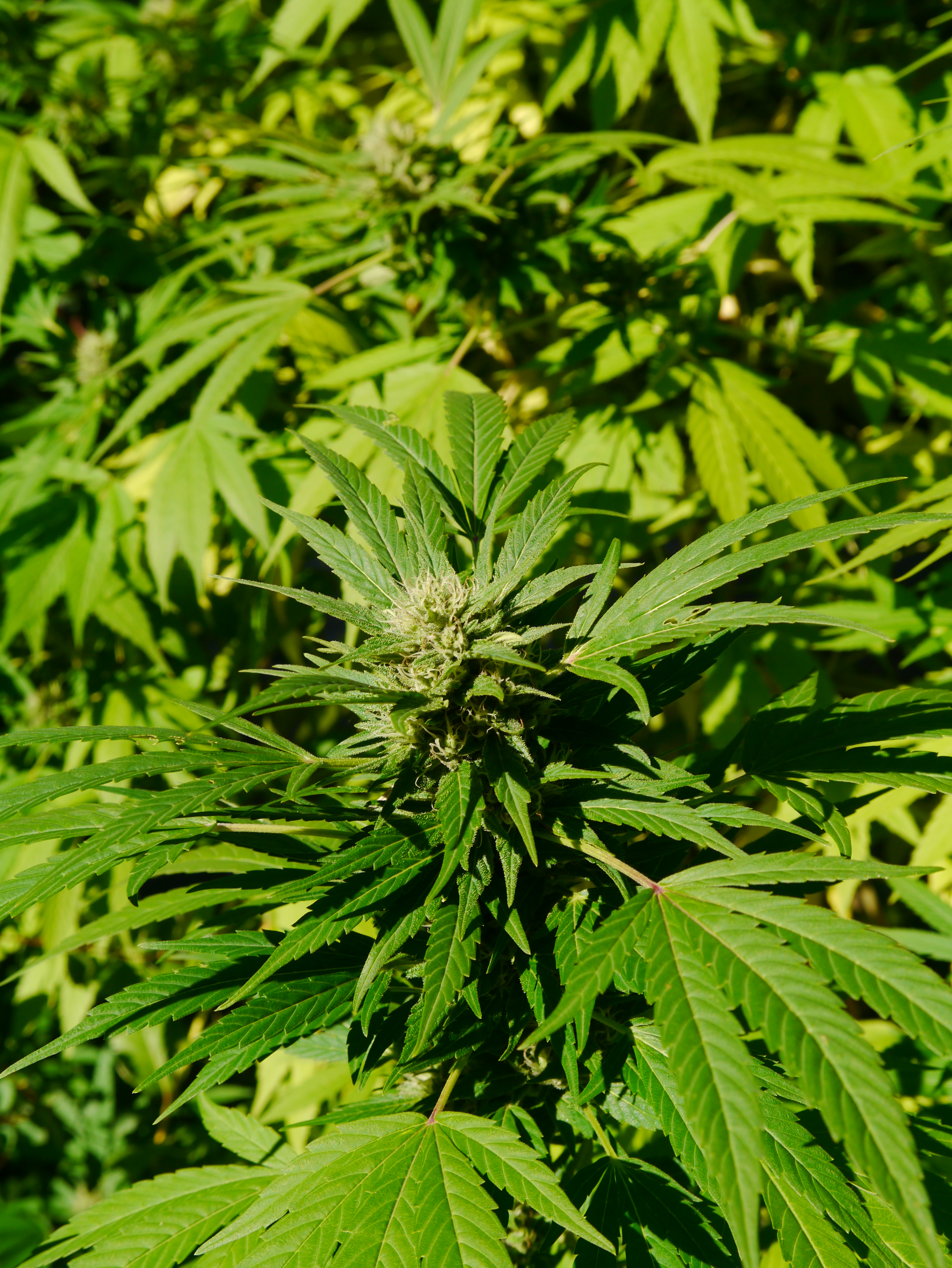
- Female Cannabis sativa, recreational/medicinal marijuana

Scientific classification
- Kingdom: Plantae
- Clade: Tracheophytes
- Clade: Angiosperms
- Clade: Eudicots
- Clade: Rosids
- Order: Rosales
- Family: Cannabaceae
- Genus: Cannabis
- Species: C. sativa

Binomial name
- Cannabis sativa L.

Subspecies
- C. sativa subsp. sativa; C. sativa subsp. indica; C. sativa subsp. ruderalis

Synonyms
- List: Cannabis americana Pharm. ex Wehmer; Cannabis chinensis Delile; Cannabis erratica Siev.; Cannabis foetens Gilib.; Cannabis generalis E.H.L.Krause; Cannabis gigantea Delile ex Vilm.; Cannabis indica Lam.; Cannabis indica f. afghanica Vavilov; Cannabis indica var. afghanica Vavilov; Cannabis indica var. kafiristanica Vavilov; Cannabis intersita Soják; Cannabis kafiristanica (Vavilov) Chrtek; Cannabis lupulus Scop.; Cannabis macrosperma Stokes; Cannabis ruderalis Janisch.; Cannabis sativa var. afghanica (Vavilov) McPartl. & E.Small; Cannabis sativa f. afghanica Vavilov; Cannabis sativa var. chinensis (Delile) A.DC.; Cannabis sativa subsp. culta Serebr.; Cannabis sativa var. gigantea (Delile ex Vilm.) Alef.; Cannabis sativa subvar. indica (Lam.) Asch. & Graebn.; Cannabis sativa var. indica (Lam.) Wehmer; Cannabis sativa subsp. indica (Lam.) E.Small & Cronquist; Cannabis sativa subsp. intersita (Soják) Soják; Cannabis sativa var. kafiristanica (Vavilov) E.Small & Cronquist; Cannabis sativa var. kif A.DC.; Cannabis sativa var. macrosperma (Stokes) Asch. & Graebn.; Cannabis sativa var. monoica Holuby; Cannabis sativa var. pedemontana A.DC.; Cannabis sativa var. praecox Serebr.; Cannabis sativa var. ruderalis (Janisch.) S.Z.Liou; Cannabis sativa var. ruderalis Janisch.; Cannabis sativa var. spontanea Vavilov; Cannabis sativa f. vulgaris (Alef.) Voss; Cannabis sativa var. vulgaris Alef.; Polygonum viridiflorum Poir.

= Cannabis sativa =

Plant species

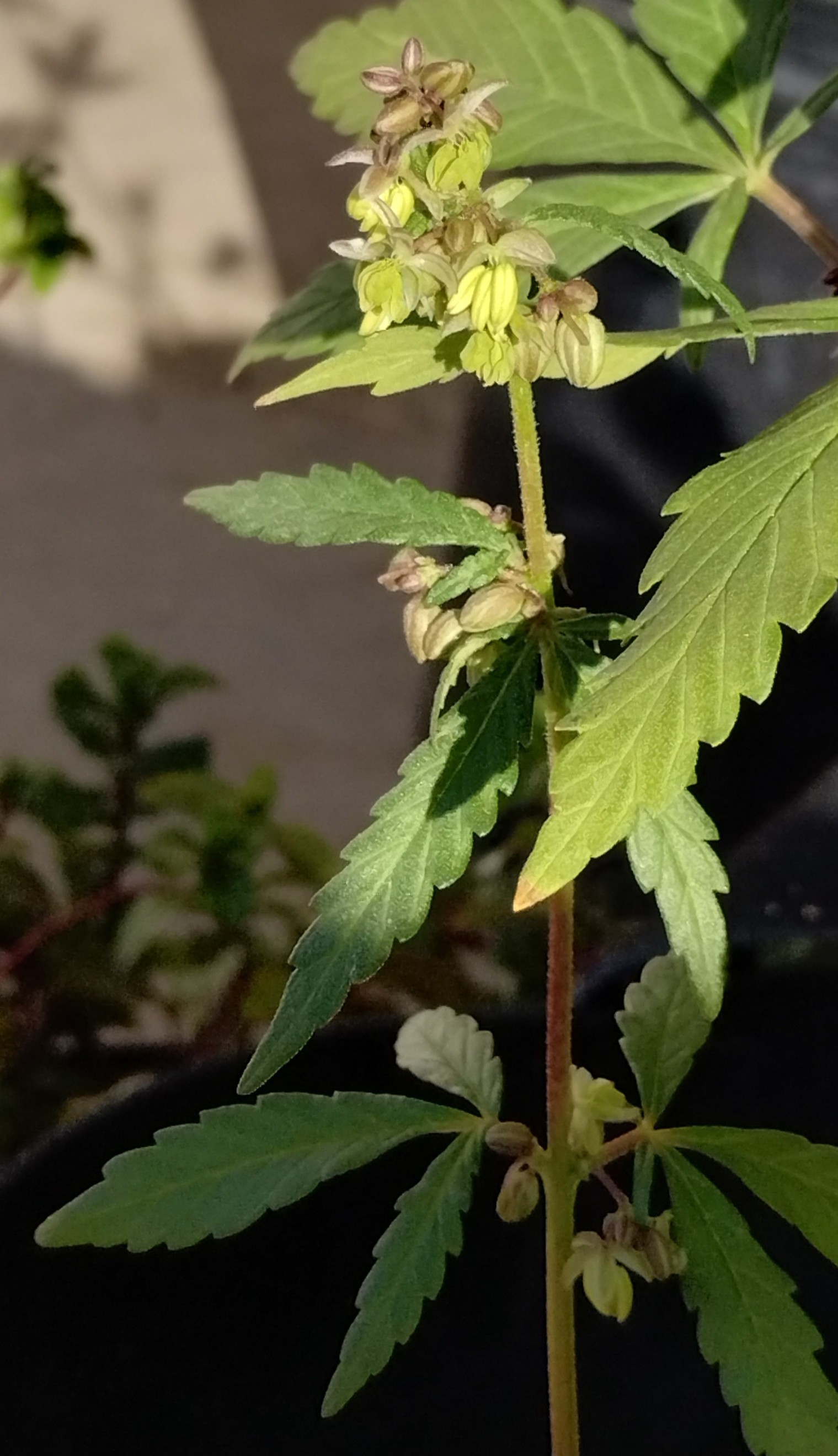
Male Cannabis sativa in flower

Cannabis sativa is an annual herbaceous flowering plant. The species was first classified by Carl Linnaeus in 1753. The specific epithet sativa means 'cultivated'. Indigenous to Eastern Asia, the plant is now of cosmopolitan distribution due to widespread cultivation. It has been cultivated throughout recorded history and used as a source of industrial fiber, seed oil, food, and medicine. It is also used as a recreational drug and for religious and spiritual purposes.

In 2011, a whole sequenced genome of the species has been published.

== Description ==
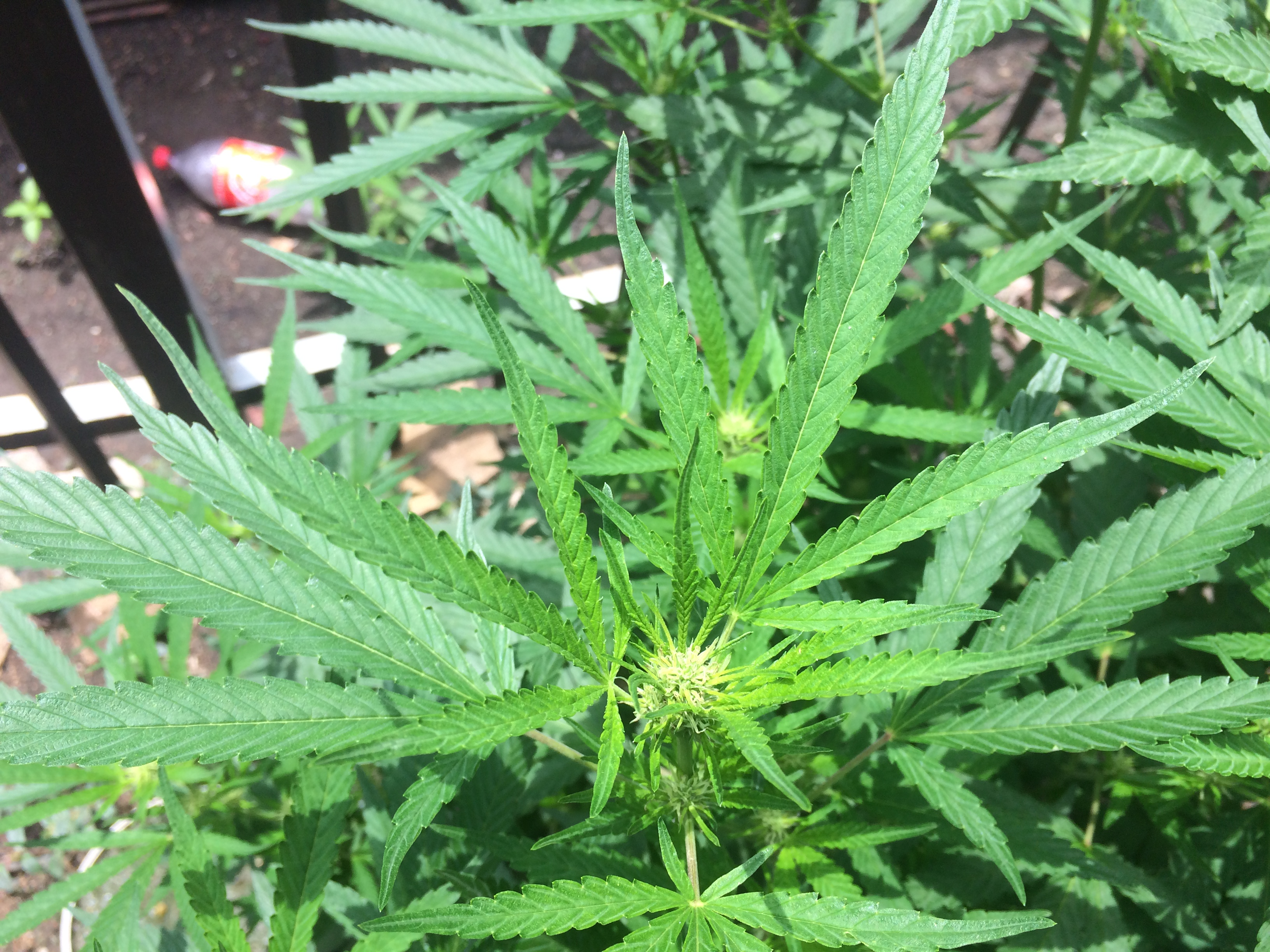
A female sativa cannabis strain in flowering or "budding" stage

The flowers of Cannabis sativa plants are most often either male or female, but only plants displaying female pistils can be or turn hermaphrodite. Males can never become hermaphrodites. It is a short-day flowering plant, with staminate (male) plants usually taller and less robust than pistillate (female or male) plants. The flowers of the female plant are arranged in racemes and can produce hundreds of seeds. Male plants shed their pollen and die several weeks prior to seed ripening on the female plants. Under typical conditions with a light period of 12 to 14 hours, both sexes are produced in equal numbers because of heritable X and Y chromosomes. Although genetic factors dispose a plant to become male or female, environmental factors including the diurnal light cycle can alter sexual expression. Naturally occurring monoecious plants, with both male and female parts, are either sterile or fertile; but artificially induced "hermaphrodites" can have fully functional reproductive organs. "Feminized" seed sold by many commercial seed suppliers are derived from artificially "hermaphroditic" females that lack the male gene, or by treating the plants with hormones or silver thiosulfate.

=== Chemical constituents ===
Δ^{9}-tetrahydrocannabinol (THC)

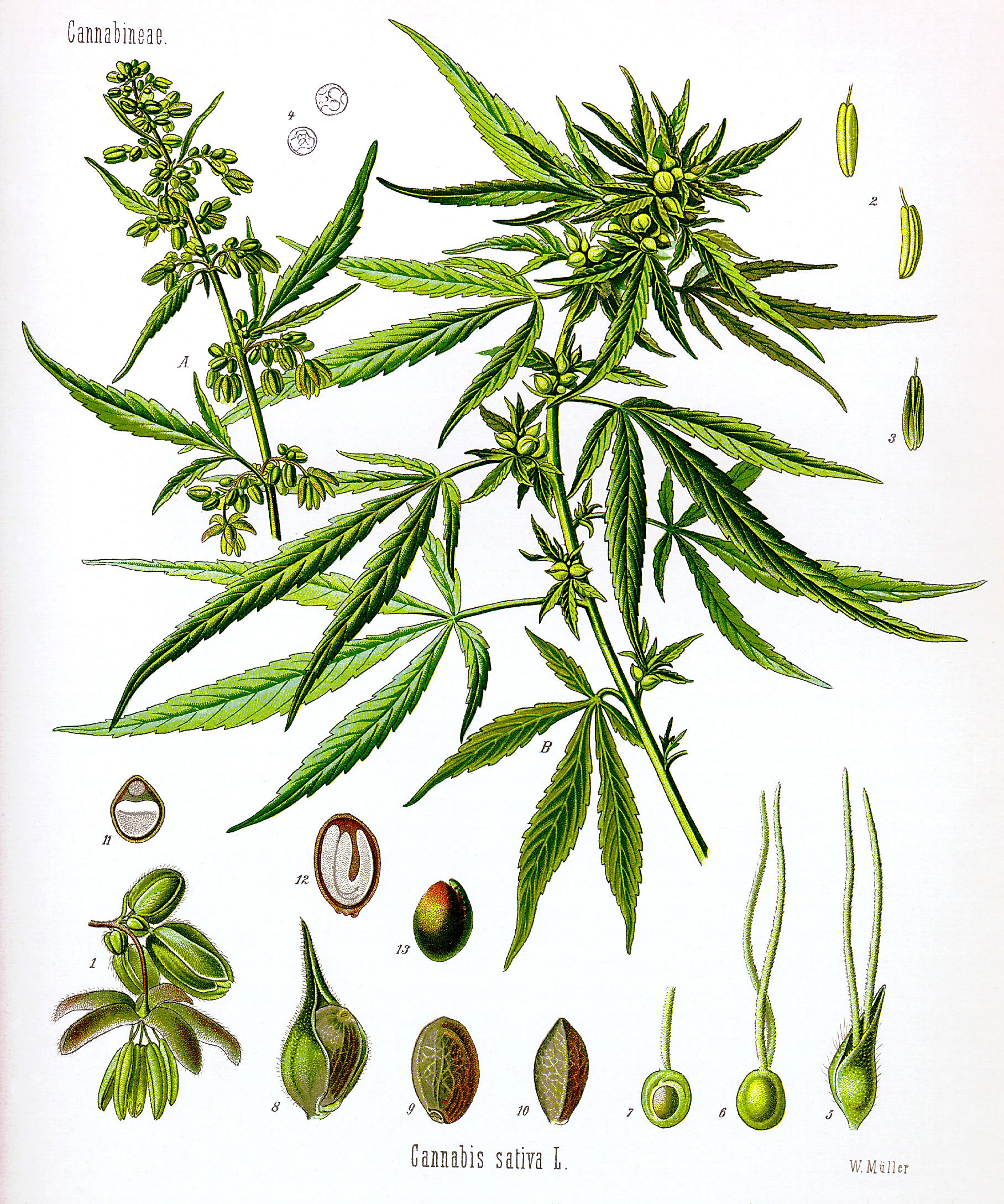
Cannabis sativa, scientific drawing from c. 1900

Although the main psychoactive constituent of Cannabis is tetrahydrocannabinol (THC), the plant is known to contain more than 500 compounds, among them at least 113 cannabinoids; however, most of these "minor" cannabinoids are only produced in trace amounts. Besides THC, another cannabinoid produced in high concentrations by some plants is cannabidiol (CBD), which is not psychoactive but has recently been shown to block the effect of THC in the nervous system. Differences in the chemical composition of Cannabis varieties may produce different effects in humans. Synthetic THC, called dronabinol, does not contain cannabidiol (CBD), cannabinol (CBN), or other cannabinoids, which is one reason why its pharmacological effects may differ significantly from those of natural Cannabis preparations.

Beside cannabinoids, the chemical constituents of Cannabis include about 120 compounds responsible for its characteristic aroma. These are mainly volatile terpenes and sesquiterpenes.

- α-Pinene
- Myrcene
- Linalool
- Limonene
- Trans-β-ocimene
- α-Terpinolene
- Trans-caryophyllene
- α-Humulene, contributes to the characteristic aroma of Cannabis sativa
- Caryophyllene, with which some hashish detection dogs are trained

A 1980 study identifying constituents of C. sativa established 19 major chemical families (number of chemicals within group):

- Acids (18)
- Alcohols (6)
- Aldehydes (12)
- Amino Acids (18)
- Cannabinoids (55)
- Esters/Lactones (11)
- Flavanoids Glycosides (14)
- Fatty Acids (20)
- Hydrocarbons (46)
- Ketones (13)
- Nitrogenous Compounds (18)
- Non-Cannabinoid Phenols (14)
- Phytocannabinoids (111)
- Pigments (2)
- Proteins (7)
- Steroids (9)
- Sugars (32)
- Terpenes (98)
- Vitamins (1)

Cannabis also produces numerous volatile sulfur compounds that contribute to the plant's skunk-like aroma, with prenylthiol (3-methyl-2-butene-1-thiol) identified as the primary odorant. These compounds are found in much lower concentrations than the major terpenes and sesquiterpenes. However, they contribute significantly to the pungent aroma of cannabis due to their low odor thresholds as often seen with thiols or other sulfur-containing compounds.

A number of specific aromatic compounds have been implicated in variety-specific aromas. These include another class of volatile sulfur compounds, referred to as tropical volatile sulfur compounds, that include 3-mercaptohexanol, 3-mercaptohexyl acetate, and 3-mercaptohexyl butyrate. These compounds possess powerful and distinctive fruity, tropical, and citrus aromas in low concentrations such as those found in certain cannabis varieties. These compounds are also important in the citrus and tropical flavors of hops, beer, wine, and tropical fruits.

In addition to volatile sulfur compounds, the heterocyclic compounds indole and skatole (3-Methyl-1H-indole) contribute to the chemical or savory aromas of certain varieties. Skatole in particular was identified as a key contributor to this scent. This compound is found in mammalian feces and is used in the perfuming industry. It possesses a complex aroma that is highly dependent on concentration.

== Cultivation ==
A Cannabis plant in the vegetative growth phase requires more than 16–18 hours of light per day to stay vegetative. Flowering usually occurs when darkness equals at least 12 hours per day. The flowering cycle can last anywhere between seven and fifteen weeks, depending on the strain and environmental conditions. When the production of psychoactive cannabinoids is sought, female plants are grown separately from male plants to induce parthenocarpy in the female plant's fruits (popularly called sin semilla which is Spanish for "without seed") and increase the production of cannabinoid-rich resin.

In soil, the optimum pH for the plant is 6.3 to 6.8. In hydroponic growing, the nutrient solution is best at 5.2 to 5.8, making Cannabis well-suited to hydroponics because this pH range is hostile to most bacteria and fungi.

Tissue culture multiplication has become important in producing medically important clones, while seed production remains the generally preferred means of multiplication. Sativa plants have narrow leaves and grow best in warm environments. They do, however, take longer to flower than their Indica counterparts, and they grow taller than the Indica cannabis strains as well.

=== Cultivars ===
Broadly, there are three main cultivar groups of cannabis that are cultivated today:

- Cultivars primarily cultivated for their fibre, characterized by long stems and little branching.
- Cultivars grown for seed which can be eaten entirely raw or from which hemp oil is extracted.
- Cultivars grown for medicinal or recreational purposes, characterized by extensive branching to maximize the number of flowers.

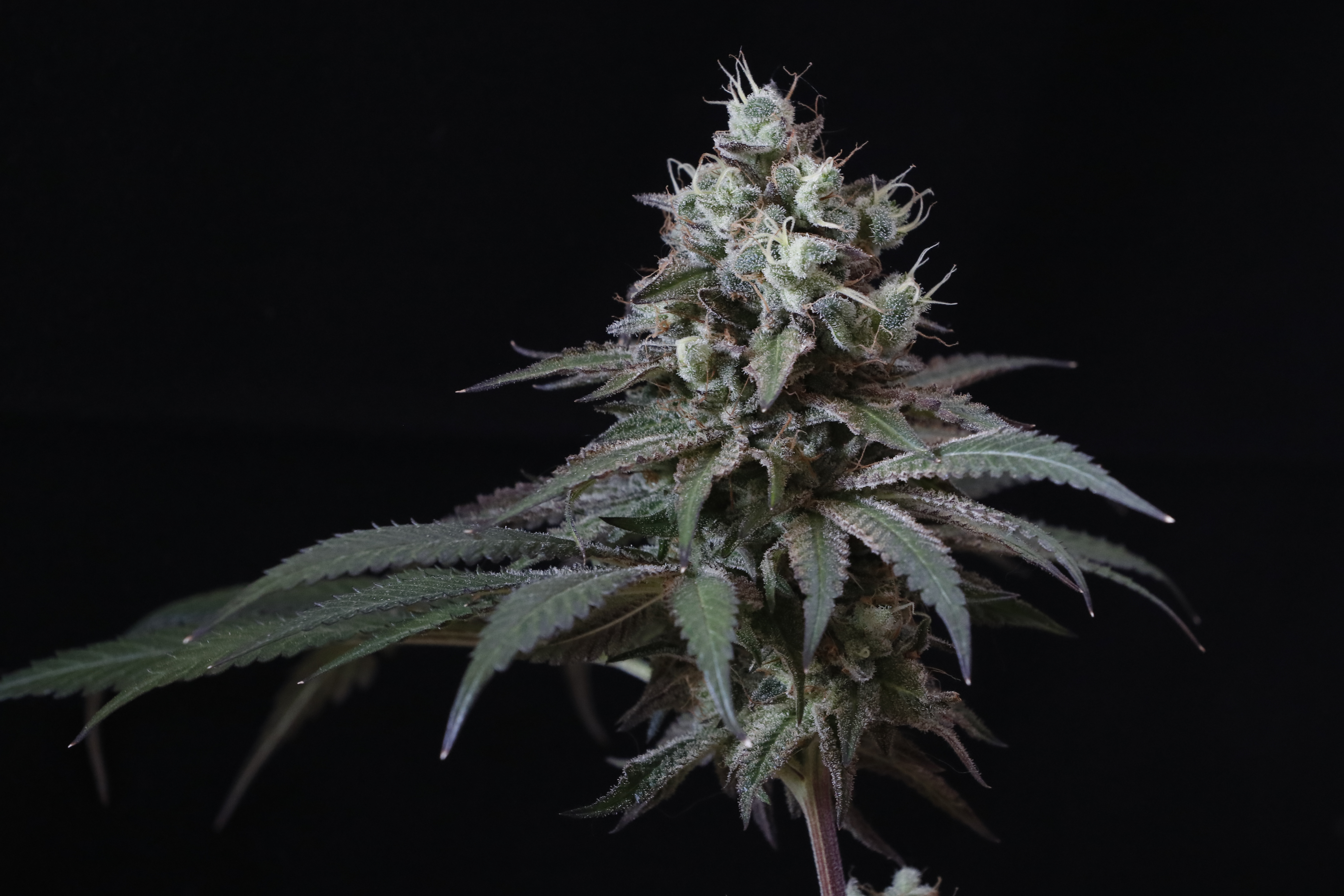
Genetic traits in a Sativa Cannabis plant well grown

A nominal if not legal distinction is often made between industrial hemp, with concentrations of psychoactive compounds far too low to be useful for that purpose, and marijuana.

== Uses ==
Cannabis sativa seeds are chiefly used to make hempseed oil which can be used for cooking, lamps, lacquers, or paints. They can also be used as caged-bird feed, as they provide a source of nutrients for most animals. The flowers and fruits (and to a lesser extent the leaves, stems, and seeds) contain psychoactive chemical compounds known as cannabinoids that are consumed for recreational, medicinal, and spiritual purposes. When so used, preparations of flowers and fruits (called marijuana) and leaves and preparations derived from resinous extract (e.g., hashish) are consumed by smoking, vaporising, and oral ingestion. Historically, tinctures, teas, and ointments have also been common preparations. In traditional medicine of India in particular cannabis sativa has been used as hallucinogenic, hypnotic, sedative, analgesic, and anti-inflammatory agent. Terpenes have gained public awareness through the growth and education of medical and recreational cannabis. Organizations and companies operating in cannabis markets have pushed education and marketing of terpenes in their products as a way to differentiate taste and effects of cannabis. The entourage effect, which describes the synergy of cannabinoids, terpenes, and other plant compounds, has also helped further awareness and demand for terpenes in cannabis products.

== See also ==
- Cannabis indica
- Cannabis ruderalis
- Cannabis strains
- Difference between C. indica and C. sativa
